= Amar Jawan Jyoti =

India's National War Memorial from 1971 to 2019 and Flame of the Immortal Soldier

- India
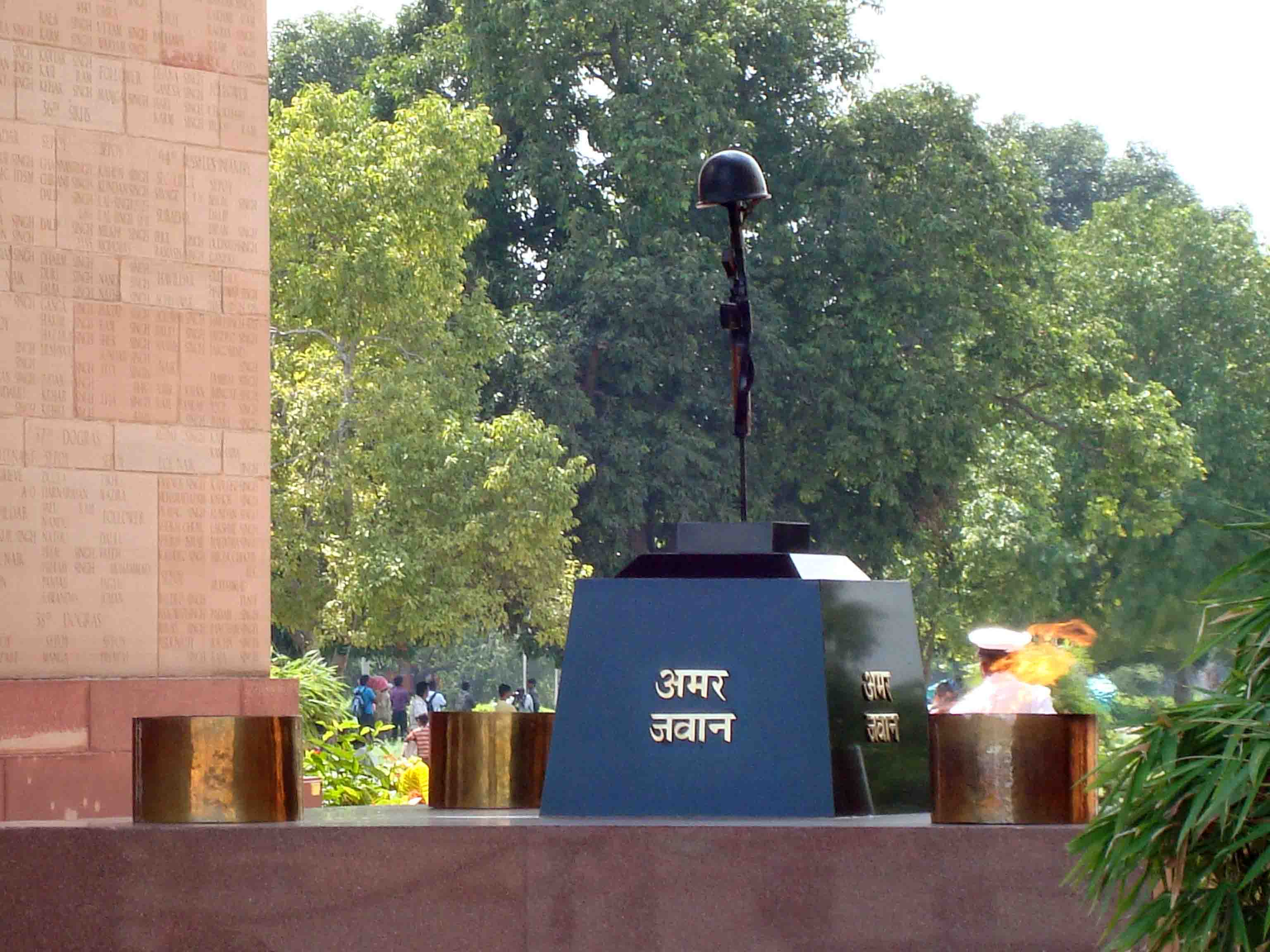
- Top Image: Amar Jawan Jyoti under India Gate; Bottom Image: Amar Jawan Jyoti at Amar Chakra of National War Memorial
- For martyrs and soldiers of Indian Armed Forces.
- Established: December 1971 under India Gate; February 2019 at War Memorial
- Unveiled: 26 January 1972 under India Gate; 25 February 2019 at War Memorial
- Location: 28.612°N 77.233°E; Both monuments at C-Hexagon; New Delhi
- Designed by: Indian Army Corps of Engineers
- अमर जवान (English: "Immortal soldier")

Amar Jawan Jyoti (lit. transl. Immortal Soldier Flame, or light (Note: Flame of the Immortal Soldier – Flame, as opposed to tomb. See Tomb of the Unknown Soldier. Immortal, as opposed to eternal. The soldier and flame have been referred to as both immortal and eternal. Jyoti (ज्योति) can also mean light.)) is an Indian memorial conceptualised and constructed after the Indo-Pakistani War of 1971 and inaugurated on 26 January 1972. It was the national war memorial in India until February 2019, when the new National War Memorial and its own flame was inaugurated and lit. On 21 January 2022, the older flame was merged with the newer one at National War Memorial.

The Amar Jawan Jyoti at India Gate consisted of a base of 15 square feet with a height of 4 feet 3 inches on which there was a black marble pedestal, a cenotaph, 3 feet 2 inches in height. "Amar Jawan" was scripted in gold in Hindi on all four sides of the cenotaph and on top, a reversed rifle capped by a war helmet. The pedestal was bound by four urns. On observances the flames were lit accordingly. It was constructed in a short timeframe as per Prime Minister Indira Gandhi wishes.

A new flame was installed at the National War Memorial to honour all known martyrs of the Indian Armed Forces of independent India. It was completed in February 2019 and inaugurated by Prime Minister Narendra Modi on 25 February with the igniting of the flame. The flame at the center of India Gate was merged with this new one by the Chief of Integrated Defence Staff, Air Marshal Balabhadhra Radha Krishna. Debate ensued with regard to the old and new monuments, related to semantics, history, politicisation and symbolism.

National War Memorial (NWM) complex and India Gate within the C-Hexagon, with Amar Jawan Jyoti and Netaji hologram statue. The rings of the NWM form a chakravyūha.

== History ==
India Gate was designed by Edwin Lutyens and unveiled in 1931. Traffic and parades would pass through the monument. Vehicular movement under the arch was restricted in the 1950s.

Amar Jawan Jyoti was added under India Gate following the Indo-Pakistani War of 1971. The war, which lasted from 3 to 16 December 1971, and ended with the Fall of Dhaka, was part of the liberation war in East Pakistan. On 26 January 1972, the twenty-third Republic Day of India, the monument was officially inaugurated by Prime Minister Indira Gandhi. This short timeframe for setting up a memorial to honour those of who fought only the previous month was as per Indira Gandhi's wishes. Author Vedica Kants has written in her 2014 book "India and the First World War" that the location of Amar Jawan Jyoti under the arch of India Gate rewrote the symbolic intention of India Gate.

For many years after Independence, there was no clear cut policy on war memorials. In 1973, the military top brass observed that memorials to commemorate war related events and martyrs were being constructed across the country without any coordination. These memorials were often left untended and were not constructed with much commemorative or architectural thought. There are at least 150 war memorials in the country. However, as the national war memorial construction was delayed, individual structures continued to be built. The construction of a National War Memorial started in 2017 and was inaugurated in 2019. When the National War Memorial was inaugurated in 2019 with a new flame the Chief of Integrated Defence Staff and a Deputy Chief of the Army Staff had said that the old Amar Jyoti Jawan would be retained, however no specifics were given.

Following the ceremony on 21 January 2022, debate ensued related to semantics, legacy, politicisation and symbolism— whether the shifted flame was merged, or extinguished; whether the five decades old memorial was temporary, irrespective of government plans to construct a permanent one; whether there could be two "eternal" flames; and how the location of the old Amar Jyoti Jawan under the Indian Gate was symbolised and its colonial linkages.

== Construction and structure ==
=== Under India Gate, in 1971 ===
The Amar Jawan Jyoti was conceptualised and constructed in less than a month as per Prime Minister Indira Gandhi's wishes, to be made ready for Republic Day on 26 January 1972. The limited timeframe constrained both the location and the scale of the memorial.

The base was 15 square feet (2,200 sq in) with a height of 4 feet 3 inches. At the centre of this was a pedestal 3 feet 2 inches in height. Here a reversed rifle was placed with a war helmet on the top. All the four sides of the memorial were inscribed the words 'Amar Jawan' in Hindi. At each of the four corners of the main platform on which rests the pedestal are the urn which contain the flames. It was white at the time.

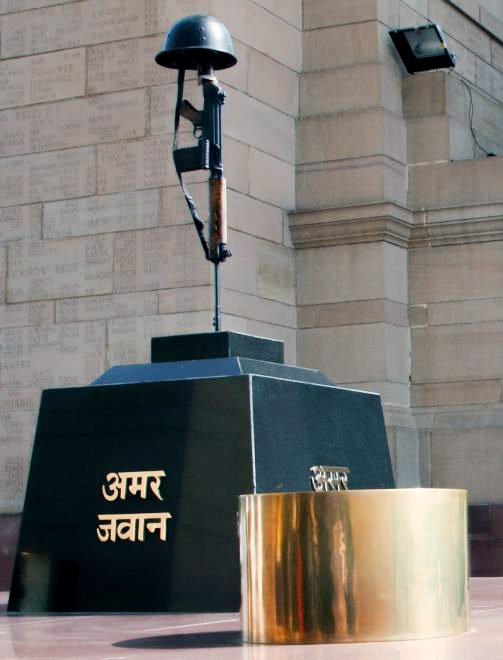
Cenotaph with a L1A1 Self-Loading Rifle placed on its barrel and capped by a helmet of the Unknown Soldier.

From 1971 to 2006, the flame was fueled by Liquified Petroleum Gas (LPG) cylinders. The pedestal was bound by four urns. Each of the urns are controlled by a separate burner. A single LPG cylinder would be able to provide fuel for one urn for about 36 hours. The cylinders were stacked in a room in the memorial. Sanctioned in December 2005, LPG cylinders were replaced by Piped Natural Gas (PNG), a safer and more economical option. A pipeline had been laid from Kasturba Gandhi Marg. The staff responsible for maintaining the burning flame resided in a room under the arch, next to the flame. The overall responsibility of the flame was under the Military Engineer Services. Chander Singh Bisht, a retired military engineer service personnel, operated the flame for four decades. The monument was always guarded.

=== At Amar Chakra, in 2019 ===
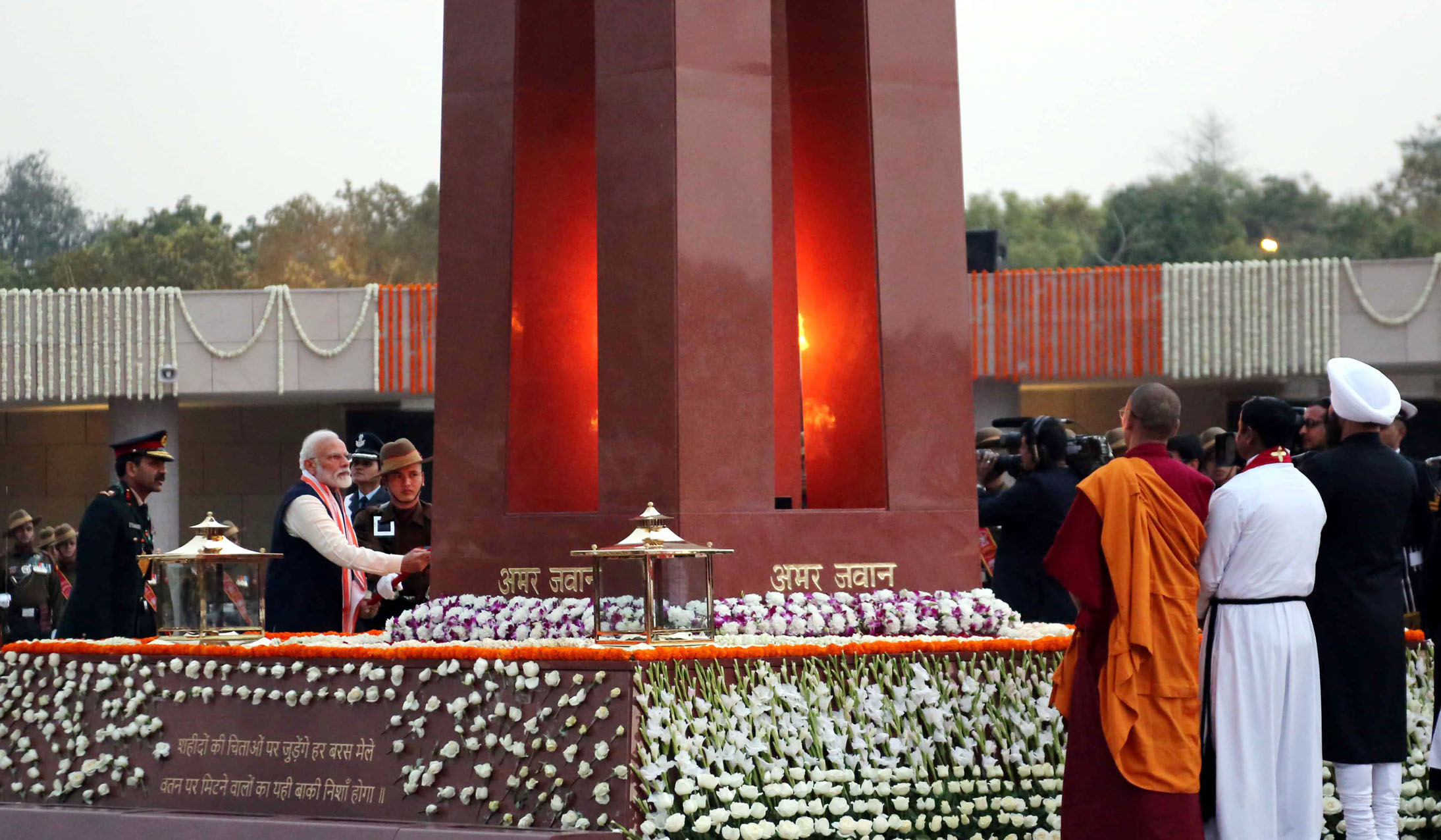
The flame at the National War Memorial being lit for the first time on 25 February 2019.

Amar Jawan Jyoti is now located at the inner ring, the Amar Chakra (Circle of Immortality), of the National War Memorial. The Memorial has four concentric circles representing a Chakravyuh and a central obelisk at the bottom of which burns the flame.

A global design competition was conducted and the result was announced in early April 2017. A Chennai architectural firm, WeBe Design Lab's proposal was declared the winner and was accordingly chosen for the conceptualization of the architectural design and for coordinating the construction of the project. The chief architect of the memorial is Yogesh Chandrahasan of WeBe Design Lab, Chennai, chosen through a global design competition and a jury chaired by Christopher Charles Benninger.

== Observances, remembrances and celebrations ==
Since 1972, every-year on Republic Day, before the Republic Day parade, it had been customary for the Prime Minister and three service chiefs and dignitaries to place a wreath at Amar Jawan Jyoti. On Independence Day, the President laid a wreath. On 16 December, Vijay Diwas, the Defence Minister laid a wreath.

Visuals from the old Amar Jawan Jyoti
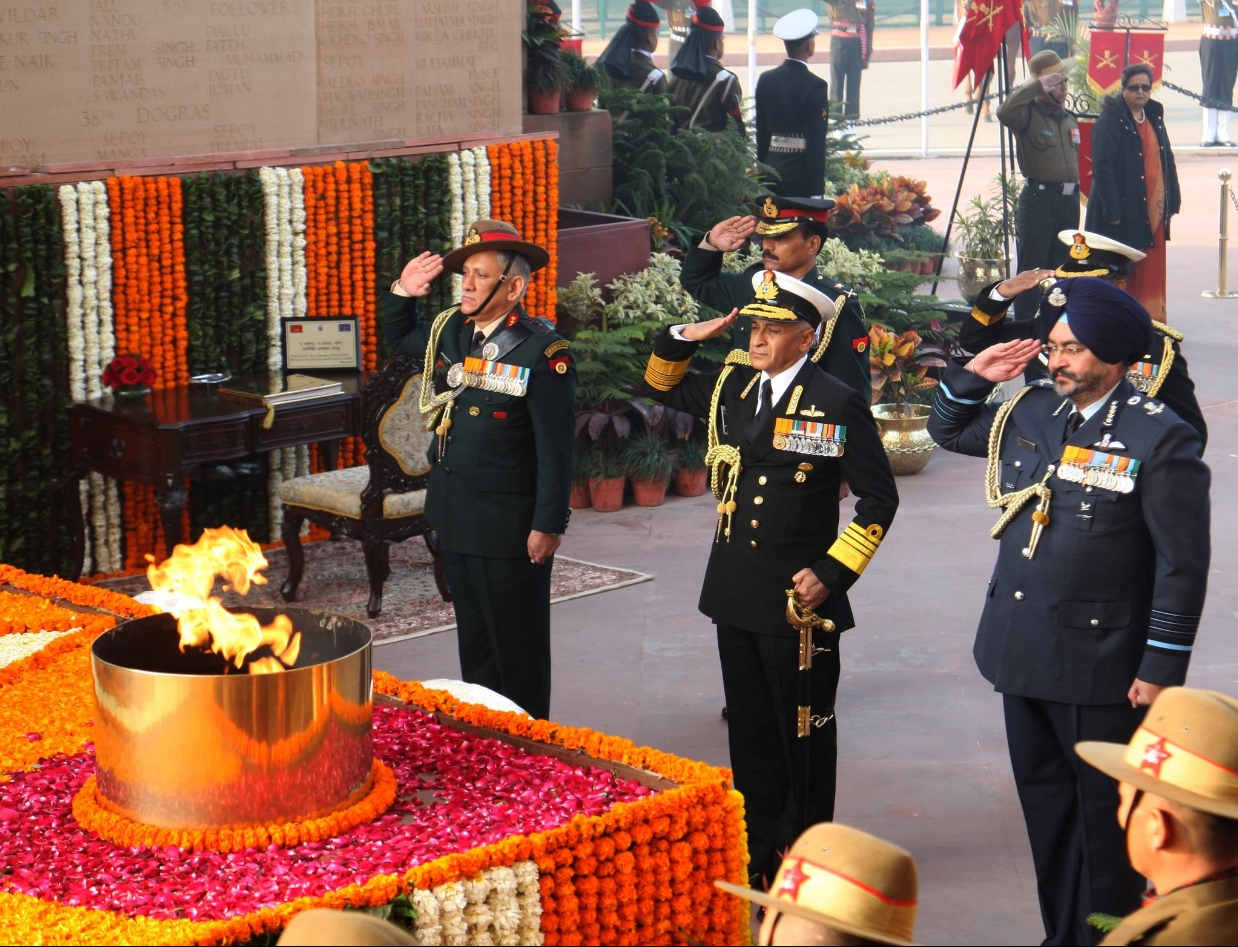
Service days: Tri Service Chiefs paying homage on Navy Day, 2017

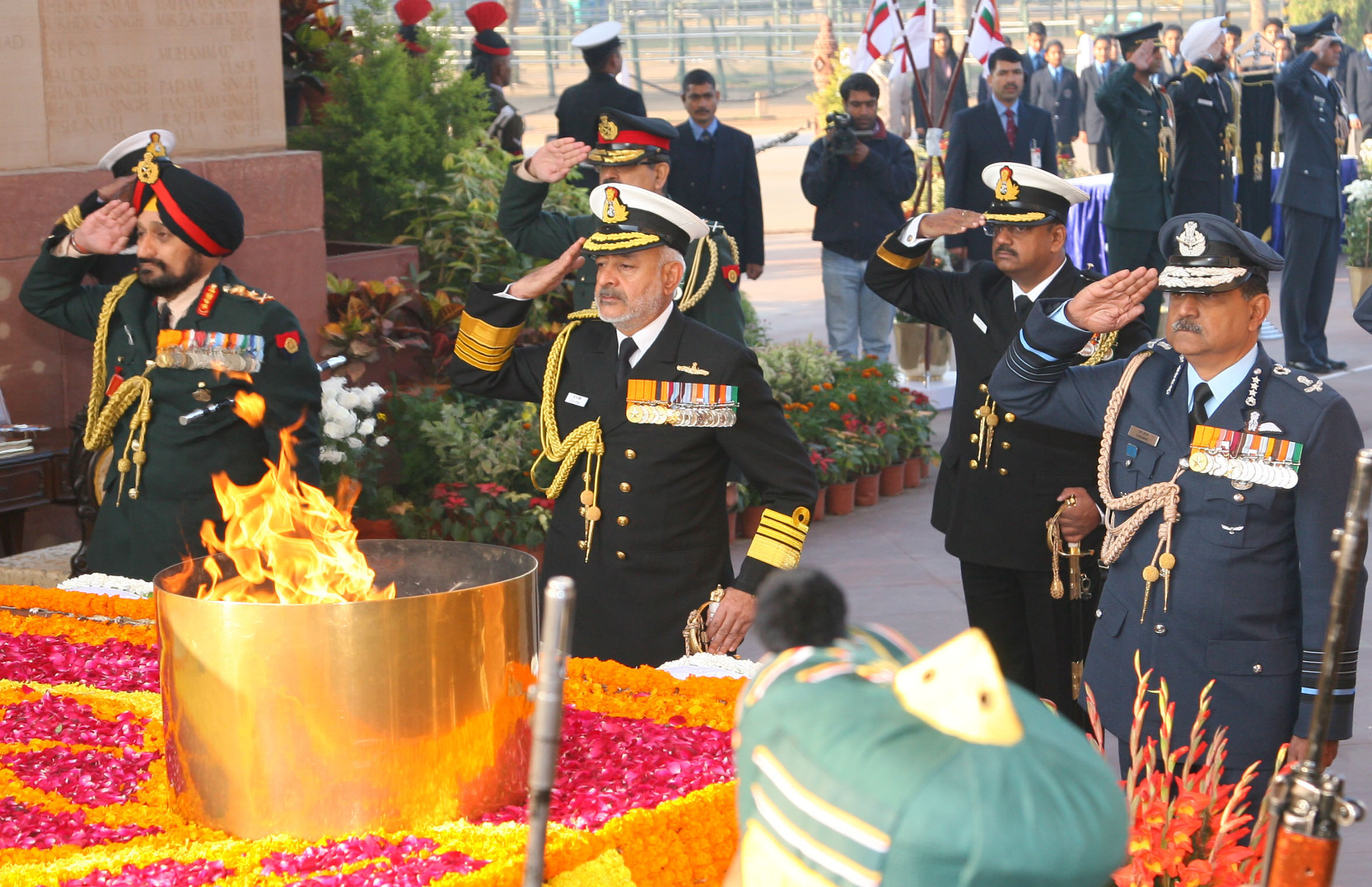
Service days: Tri Service Chiefs paying homage on Navy Day, 2012

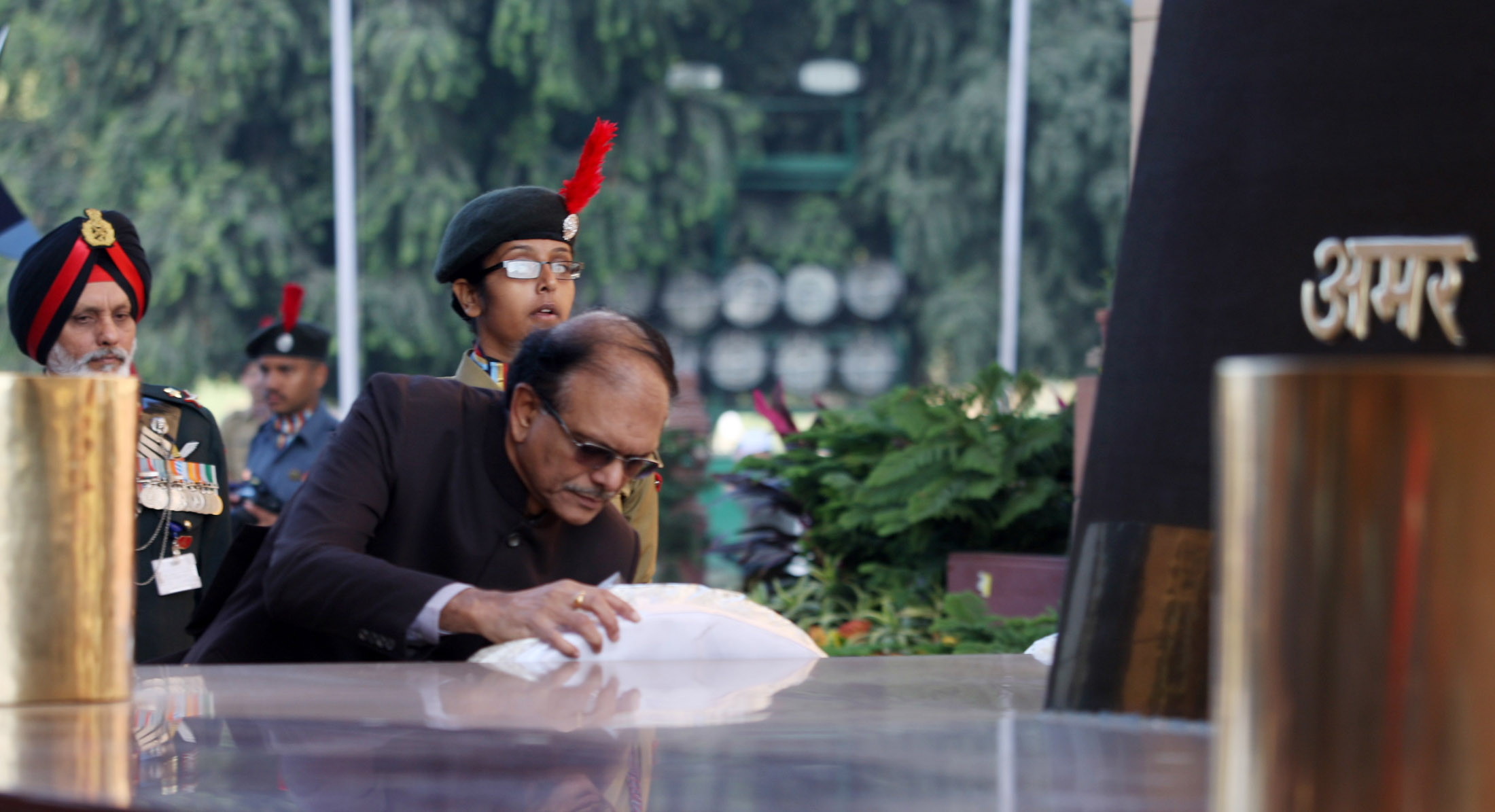
Select anniversaries: Defence Secretary G. Mohan Kumar on 68th anniversary of National Cadet Corps

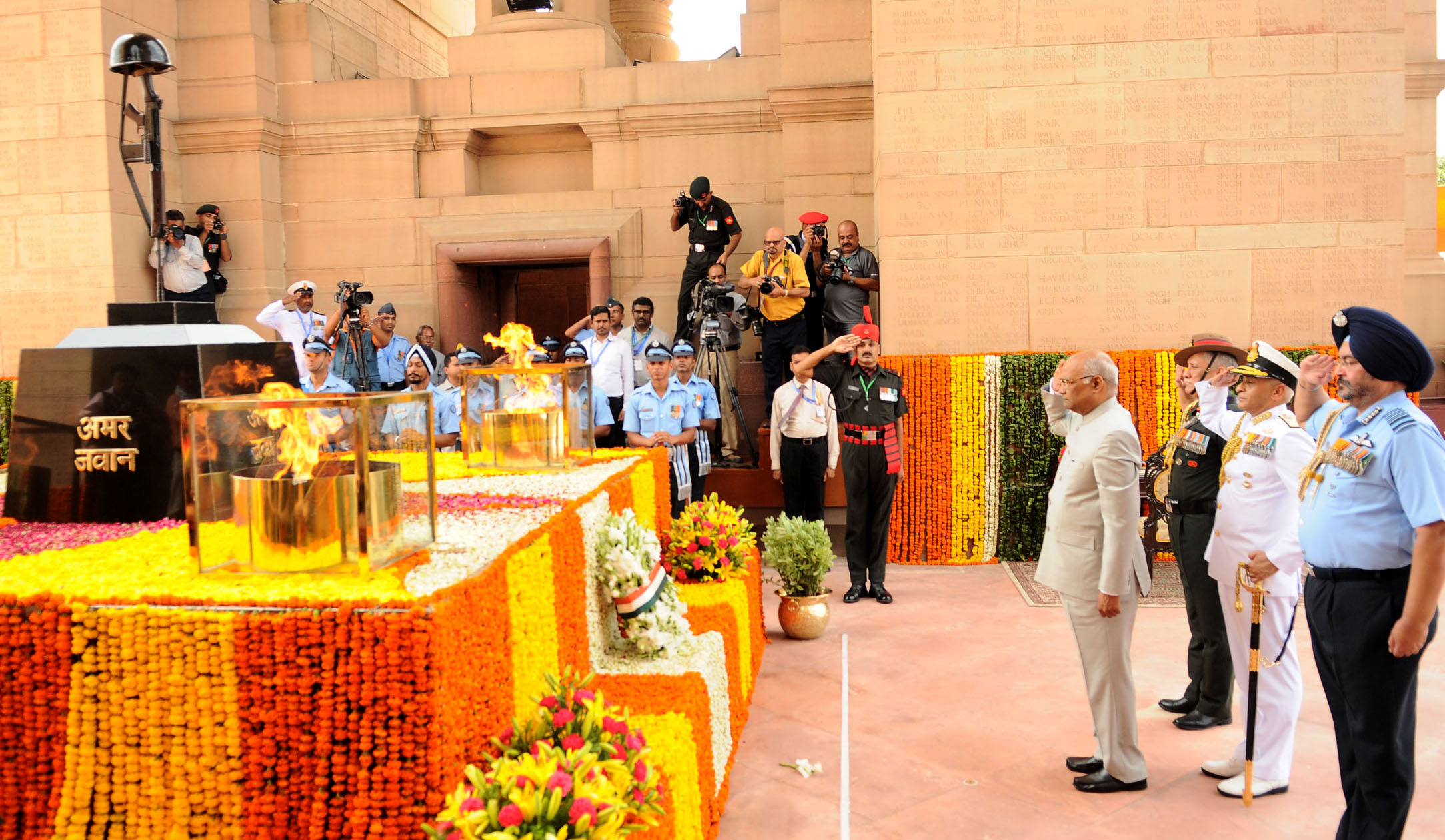
National days: The President and service chiefs on Independence Day (India), 2017

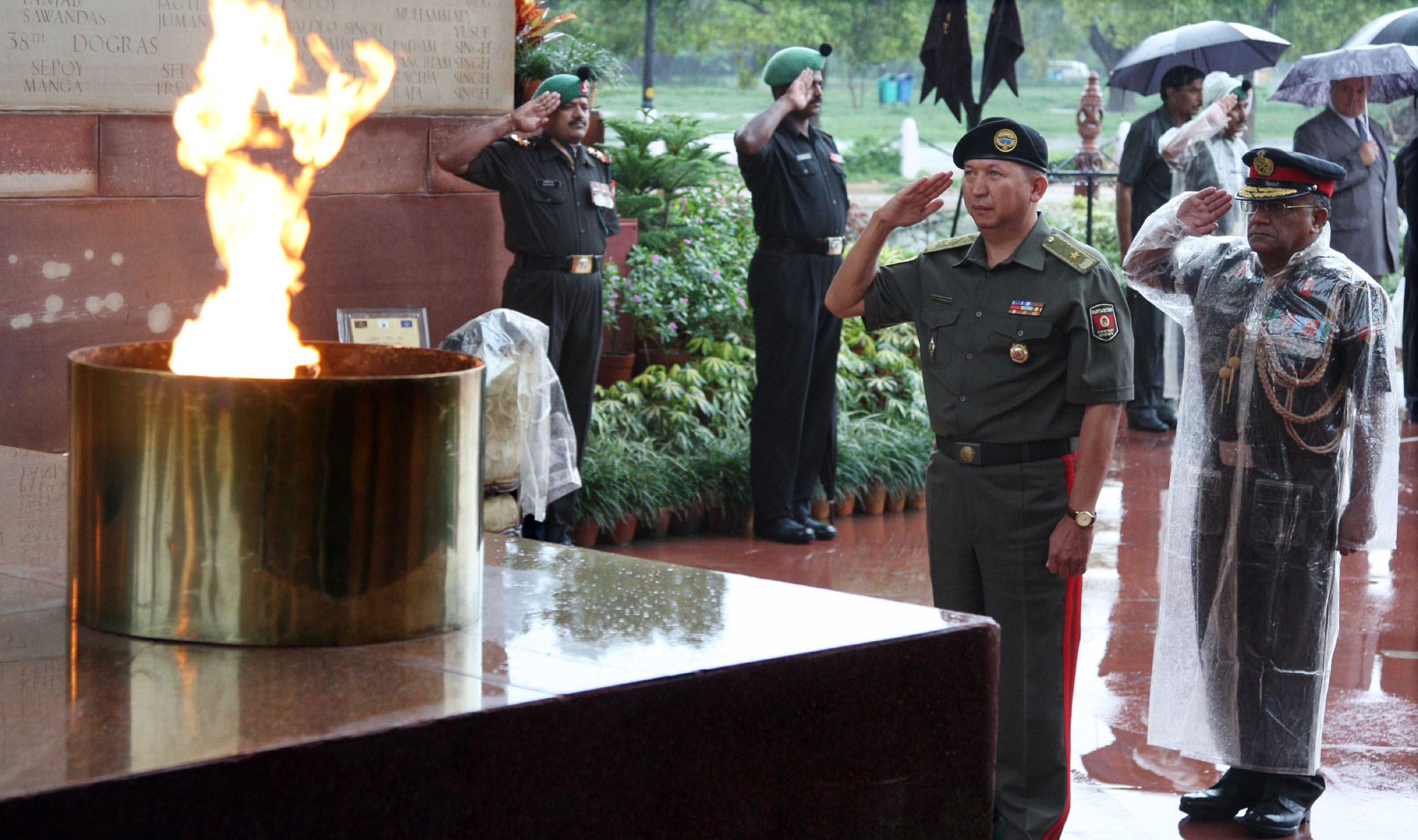
Foreign dignitaries: Kyrgyzstan Defence Minister, Major General Abibilla Kudayberdiev rendering a hand salute, 2011

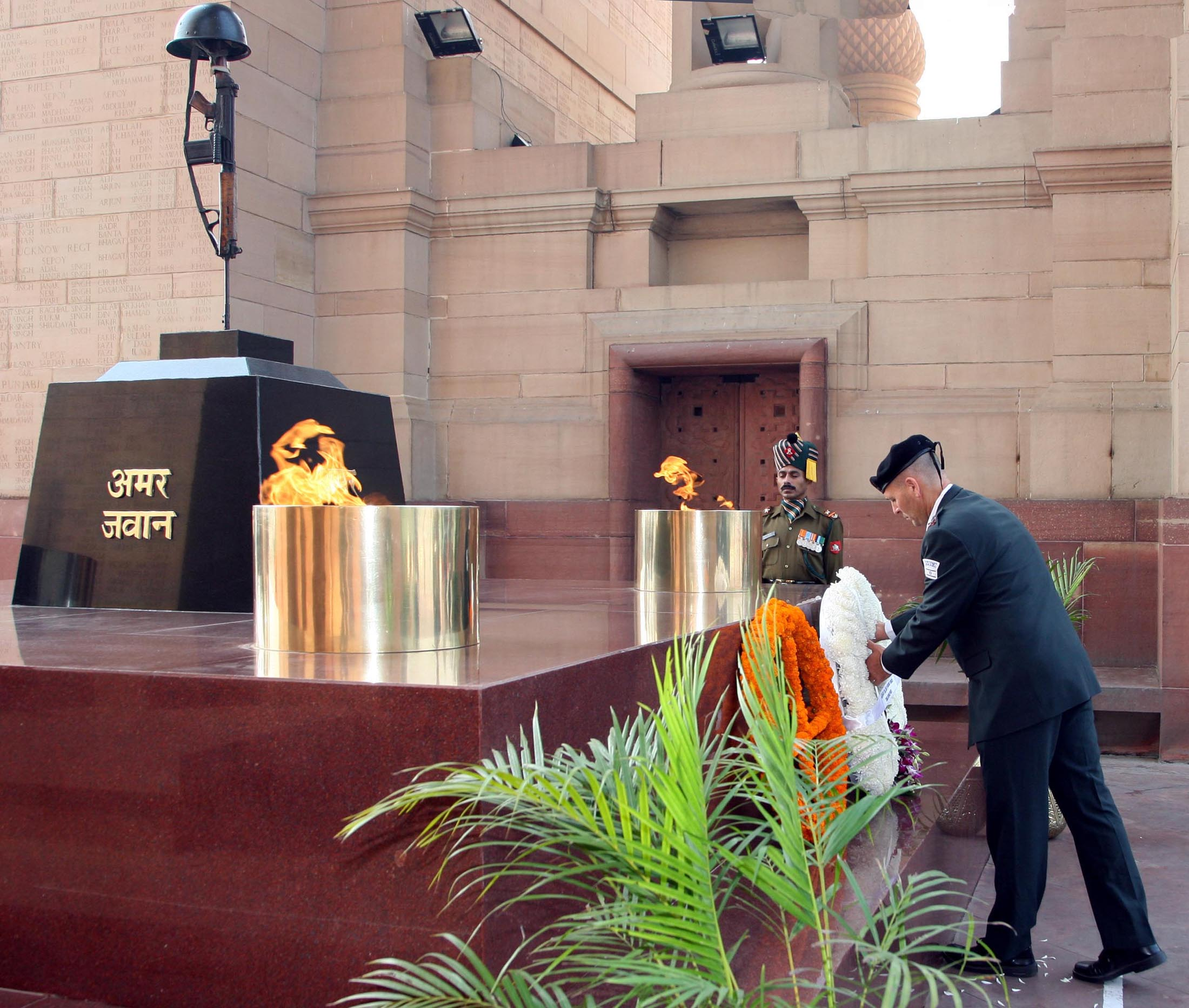
Foreign dignitaries: Wreath laying by Chief of Ground Forces of Israel Defense Forces, Major General Guy Tzur, November 12, 2013
A representative group. For more images see Wikimedia Commons

From 2020 onwards the Prime Minister, on the occasion of the 71st Republic Day, placed the wreath at the National War Memorial instead of the Amar Jyoti Jawan at India Gate. The Prime Minister is accompanied by the Chief of Defence Staff, along with the Army Chief, Navy Chief, and Air Force Chief.

Visuals from the new Amar Jawan Jyoti
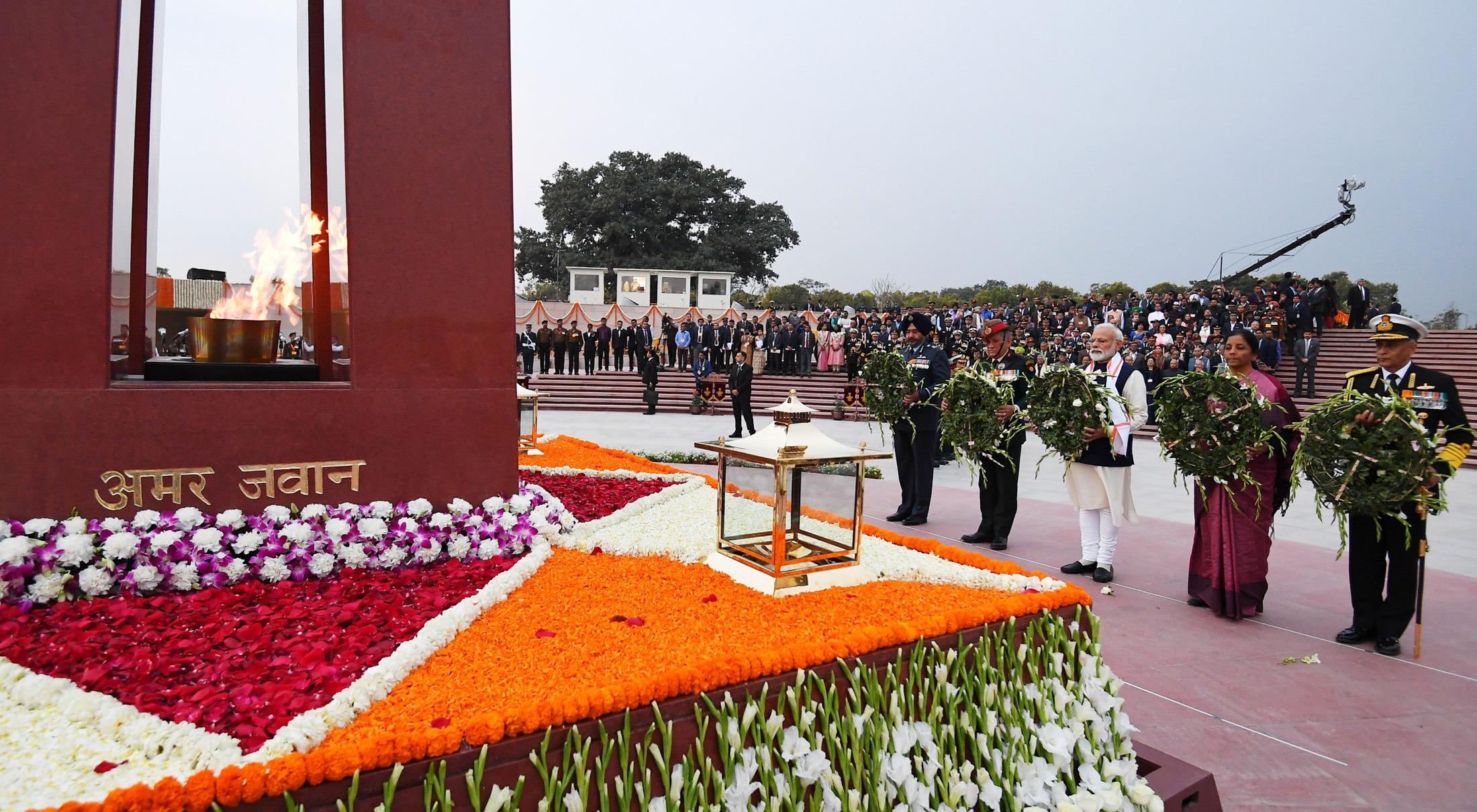
Dedication ceremony, 2019

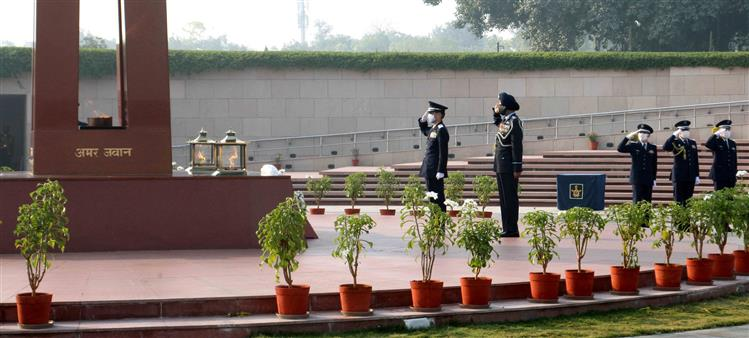
The Chief of Staff, Japan Air Self Defense Force, General Izutsu Shunji, 2020.

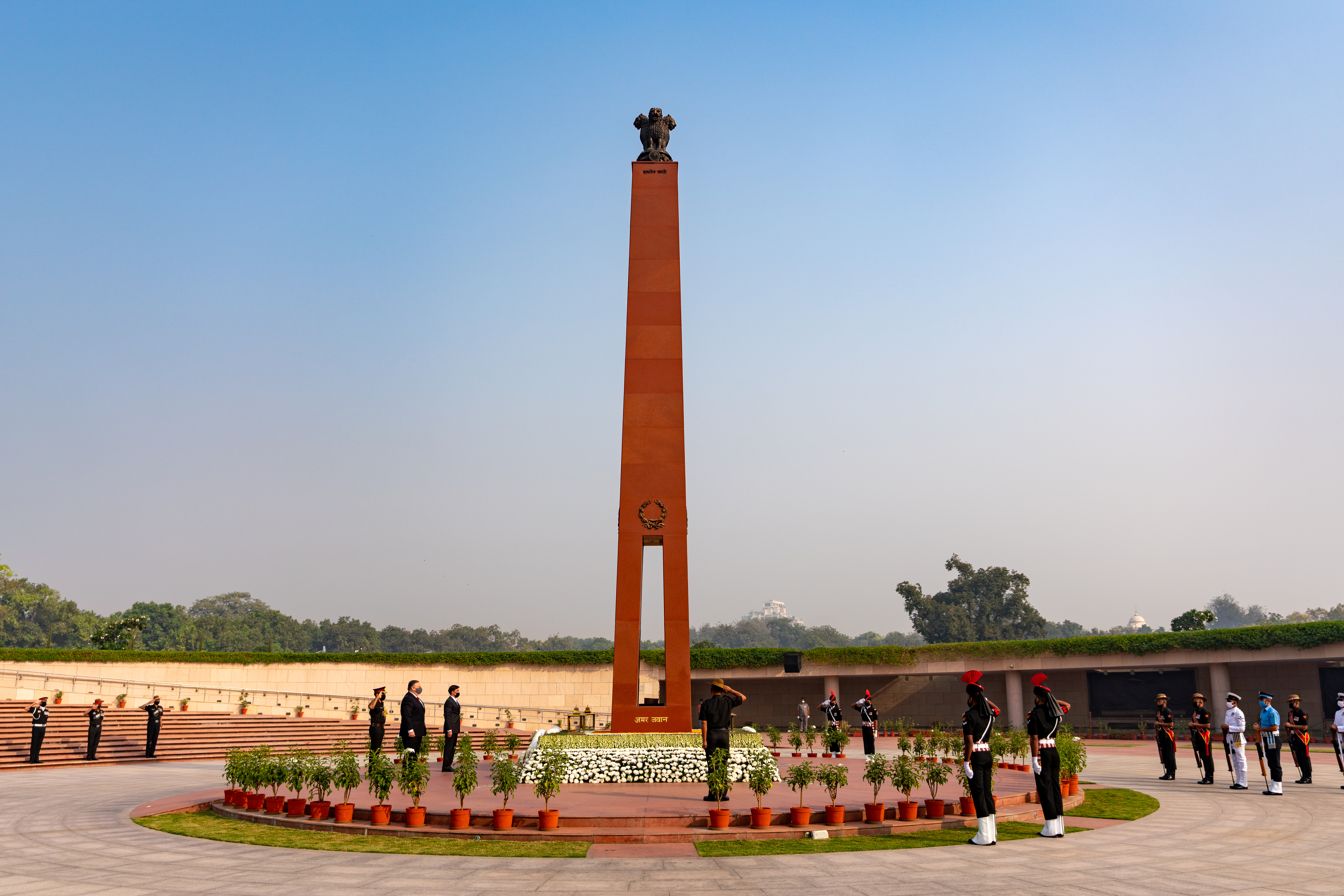
Wreath laying by the United States Secretary of State and Secretary of Defense, 2020
Representative; for more images see Wikimedia Commons

== See also ==
- National Military Memorial in Bengaluru
- National War Memorial Southern Command in Pune
- Jharkhand War Memorial in Ranchi
- Kargil Chowk in Patna
- Kargil War Memorial at Dras, Kargil
- Victory at Sea Memorial in Visakhapatnam
- National Police Memorial in New Delhi
- Kargil Vijay Diwas
- Vijay Diwas (India)
- Bijoy Dibos

== Bibliography ==
- Chhina, Rana T.S. (2014). Last Post. Indian War Memorials Around the World (PDF). A public diplomacy initiative of the Ministry of External Affairs. Centre for Armed Forces Historical Research, United Service Institution of India. ISBN 978-8190209793. Archived (PDF) from the original on 20 January 2022.
