= National Military Memorial =

Indian memorial in Bangalore

Coordinates: 12.985521°N 77.590458°E

National Military Memorial (Rashtriya Sainika Smaraka) is a memorial park located in Bengaluru and established by the Government of Karnataka in 2013 to honour the men and families of martyrs who died in the service of the nation.

== Location ==
The memorial with an area of 7.5 acres is located at 2, Millers Road, Vasanth Nagar, Bengaluru opposite the Nehru Planetarium and inside the Indira Gandhi Musical Fountain Park.

== Development ==
The foundation for the memorial park was laid in February 2009, and thrown open to the public in 2013. Two of the key persons behind the park were Air Commodore M K Chandrasekhar VM (retired), a former pilot in the Indian Air Force, and his son Rajeev Chandrasekhar, now an ex- Rajya Sabha Member of Parliament. The Bengaluru Development Authority (BDA) was assigned the task of overseeing the project by the state government. The memorial was created after long legal battle that reached Supreme Court. The park was designed by Nisha Mathew Ghosh and Soumitro Ghosh.

== Design ==
The memorial is located on a central road of the city directly opposite to the Jawaharlal Nehru Planetarium (Bangalore) and close to the Raj Bhavan. It is conceived as a place of quiet remembrance and homage. It was one of the first projects of this nature undertaken by the State Government, and aims at recognising the servicemen of the country. The project was designed to be a primordial, ceremonial path in the forest as an expression of honour to the martyr's and their memory. It has different areas all of which are linked by the path to complete the larger journey/narrative of the memorial.

The ceremonial path of commemoration begins adjacent to a series of plaques with the physical marking of 21,763 martyr's names and proceeds into an underground memorial hall that houses the information of the missions undertaken by the martyr’s and ends at a tall national flagpole beside the Veeragallu (a symbolic stone that marks the heroic death of a warrior in battle in Karnataka), and leads downwards to a memorial hall/museum. With the intent of preserving the nature at the site, the built form of the memorial hall was designed to disappear into the ground like a bunker and passes below the roots of the trees at the site, of which there are 320 remaining out of an original 324 (4 Eucalyptus trees were removed to accommodate the structure).

The Entrance to the memorial hall begins with an open court with amphitheatre-like steps, the first of 5 courts that serve to provide ventilation and daylight into the underground structure. In addition to these open courts, triangular skylights animate the space throughout the day. The materiality of this space makes allusions to a concrete bunker with its raw form finished concrete. The concrete and nature of this material along with its casting process is still as manual as it was in 1947 and this lies underneath in the memorial hall in its raw cast finish. The shadows of the trees above in the precinct and insulation from the soil above the hall also provide the hall with its own environment detached from the world above ground. A reflective space that views the ground above and trees from the viewpoint of being well below the roots of the trees. The hall is a simple structure like a box that is punctuated by the underground / sunken courtyards and structured through its more than 100 meters length by natural light.

Within the memorial hall, various weapon systems, charts, etc. are present. Aircraft are suspended from the ceiling and statues of various well known figures of the Armed Forces are displayed.

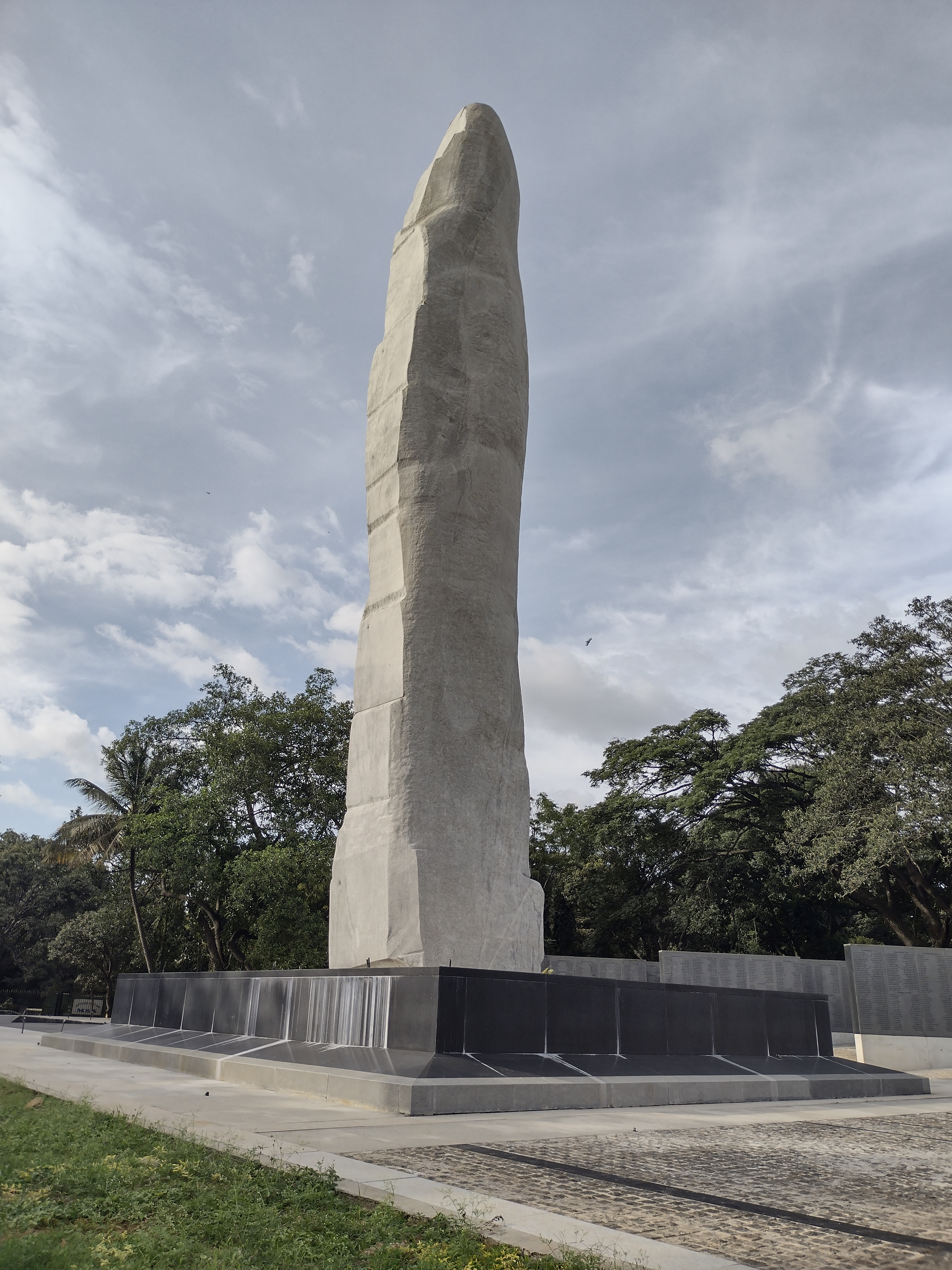
Hero Stone at the National Military Memorial

One of the other major parts of the memorial, the Veeragallu, was designed to reflect the sacrifice of the soldiers remembered here. 'From the wilderness, now unearthed and to become the sacrificial monolith, just like the lives lost for the country'. Shaping and carrying its body to its final installation at the Veerabhumi (place of the brave martyr’s) was an engineering feat. The following were the broad stages of the process which were photographically documented:

1. The quarry at Koyira
2. Shaping the Veeragallu at the quarry
3. Lifting the jacks
4. Moving out of the quarry
5. Travelling to the Veerabhumi
6. Placing the Veeragallu
7. Installed for the last final surface preparation

Adjacent to the Veeragallu is the 65 meter (213 feet) flagpole which hosts the countries largest national flag at 48 x 78 feet.

Overground, the memorial displays various armoured vehicles, aircraft, missile systems and scale models within exhibit buildings.

== Reception ==
Though the foundation for the memorial park was laid in February 2009, the project had been plagued by numerous delays and obstacles. After missing around six deadlines for inauguration, the park was opened in 2013. However, the memorial is still under construction in parts. In the initial days, the work was stalled for several months because environmentalists objected to the felling of trees and launched a massive protest. Eventually, construction activity resumed after the Supreme Court gave its nod. Many parts of the park are in a state of disrepair. Most of the installed equipment is dysfunctional, rusty or broken. The underground hall is kept locked and the displays don’t have any description boards.

== Media gallery ==
National Military Memorial in 2021
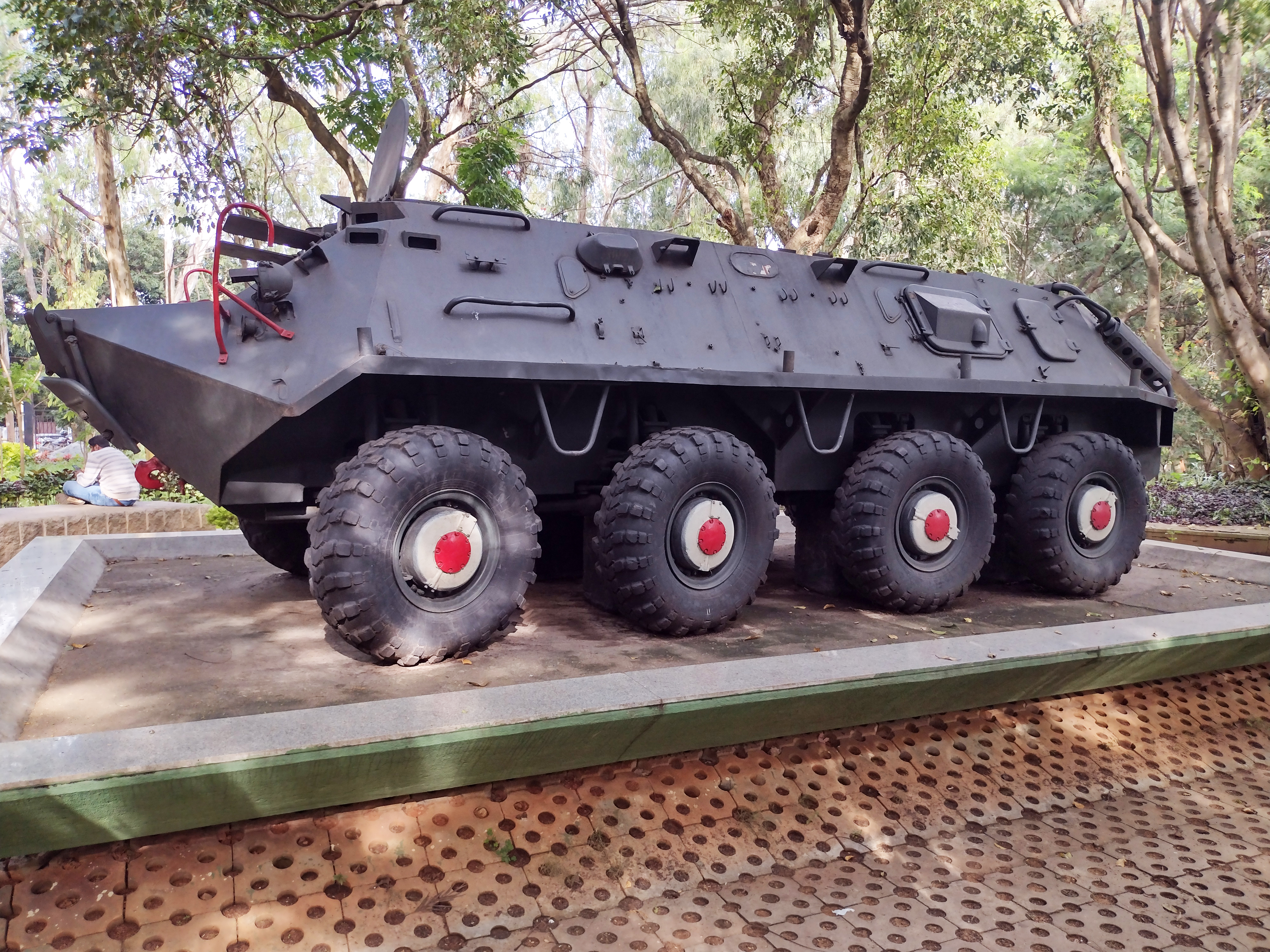

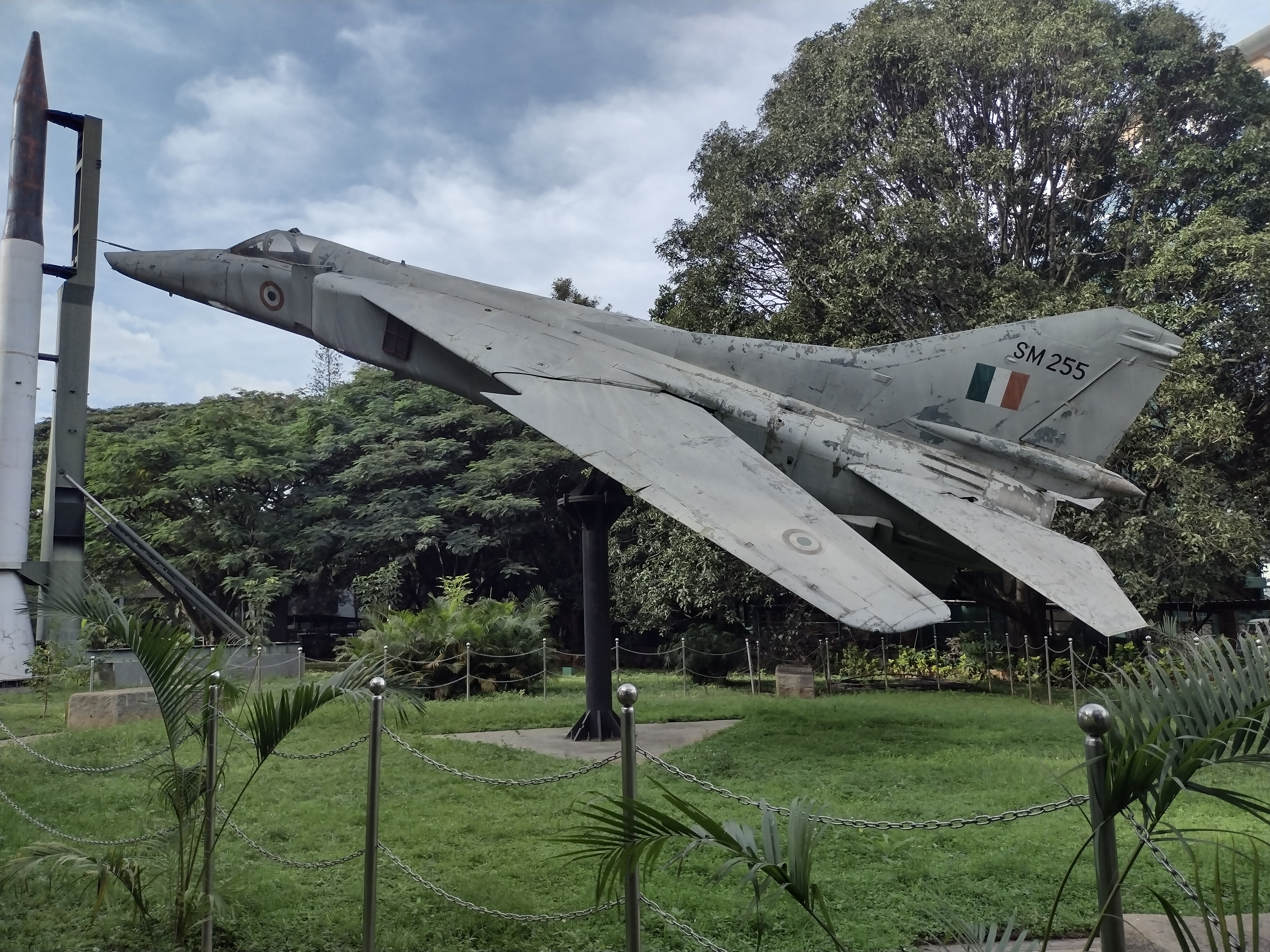

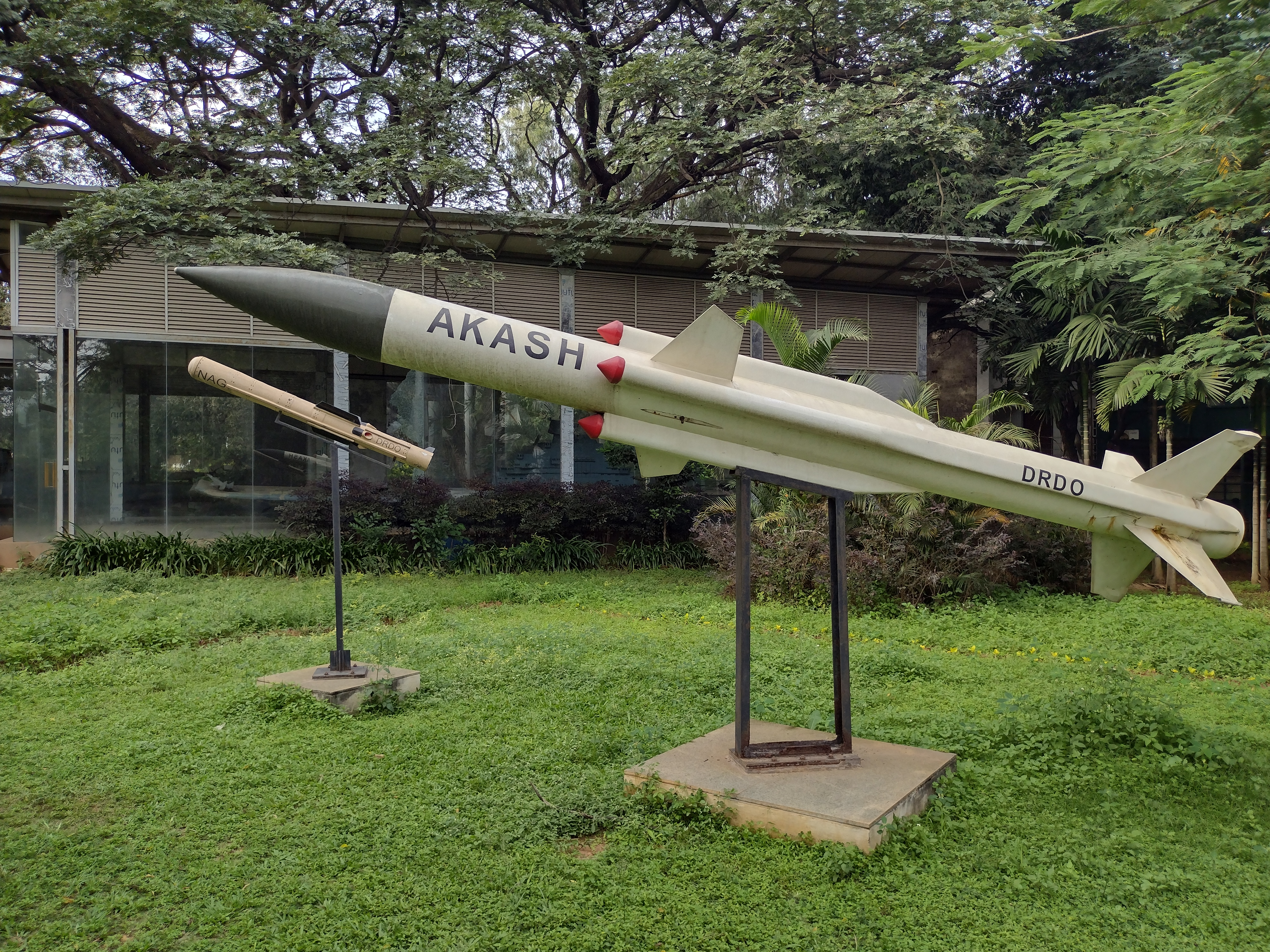

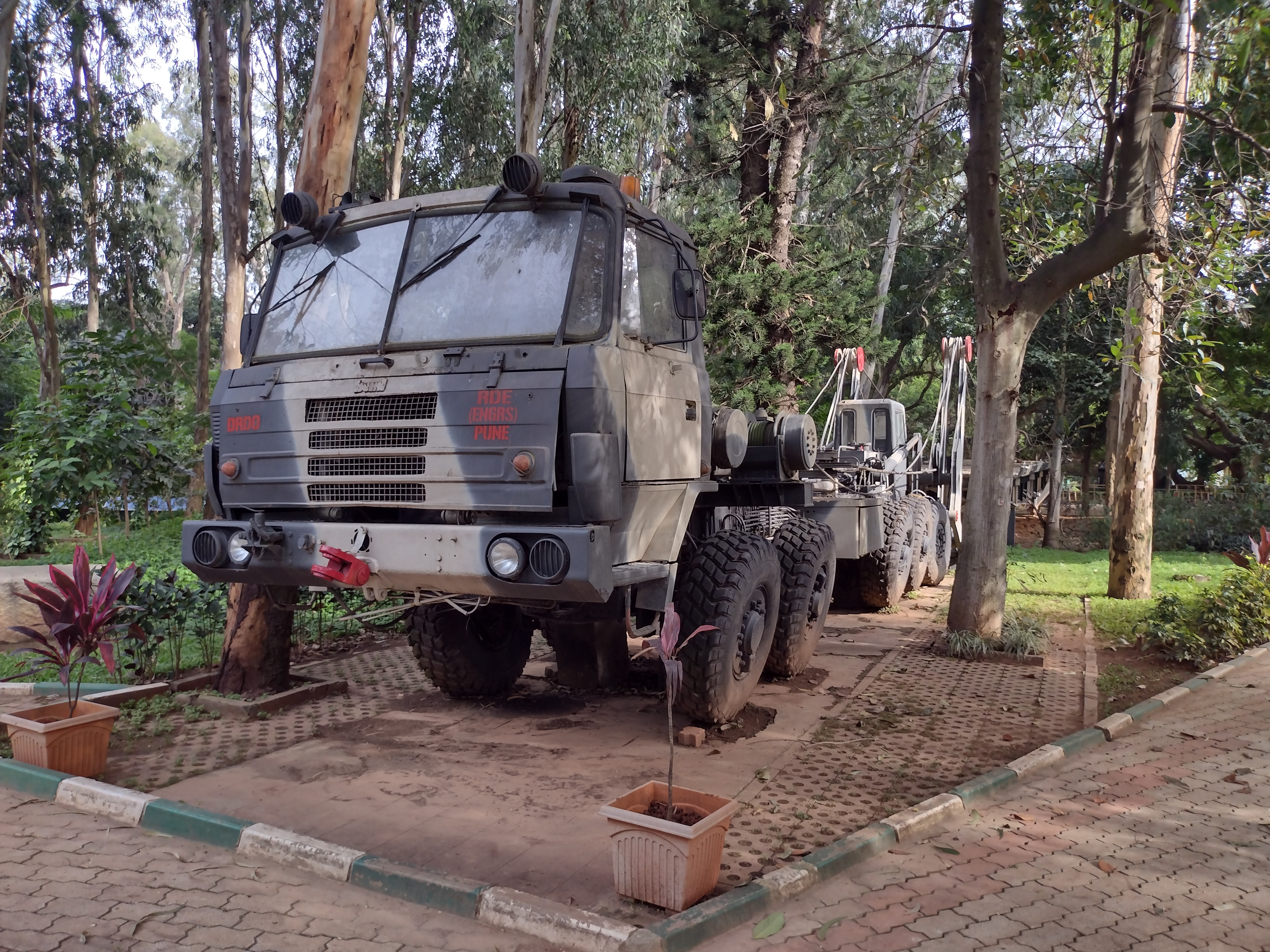

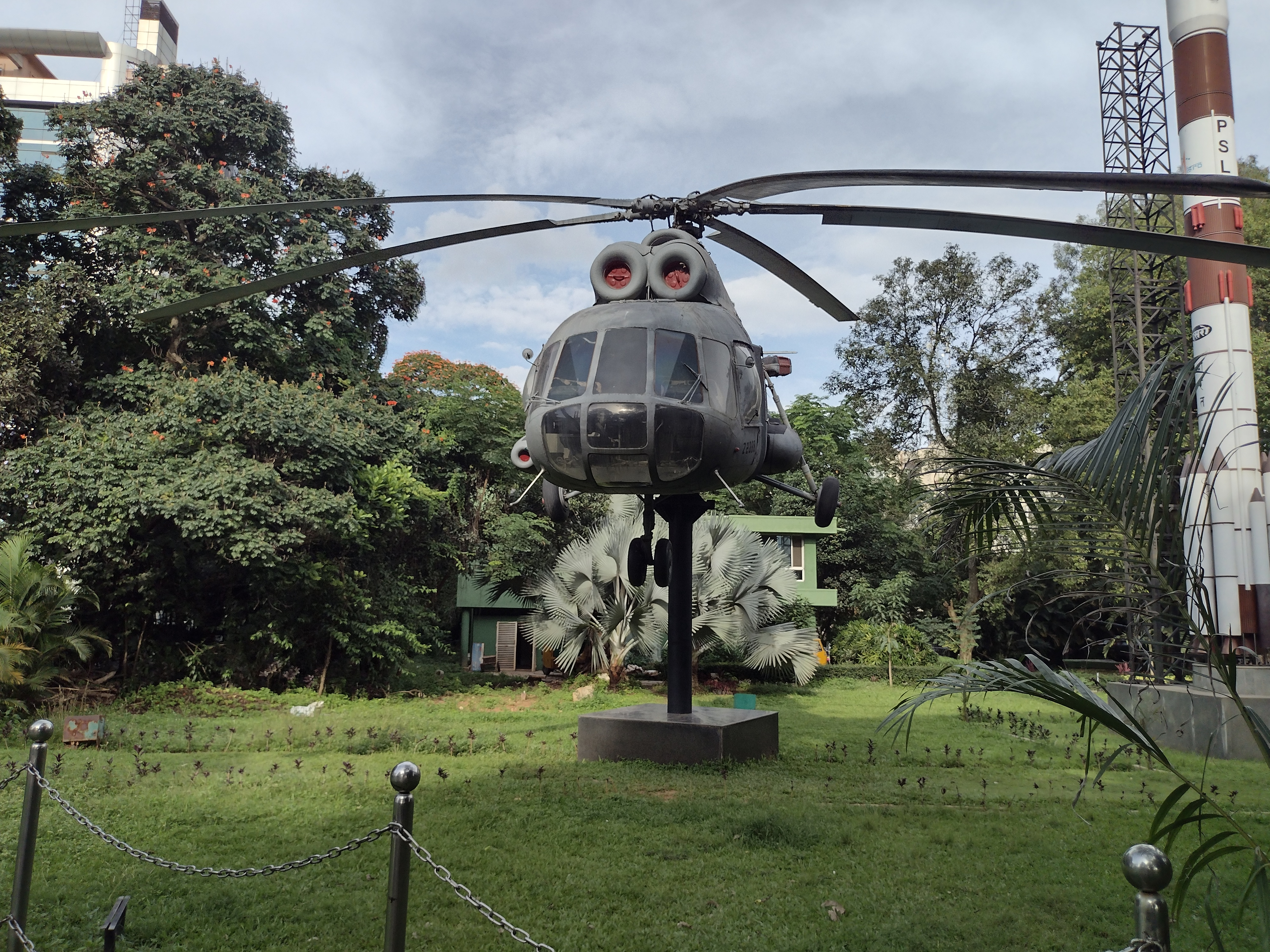

== See also ==
- Amar Jawan Jyoti in New Delhi
- India Gate in New Delhi
- National War Memorial in New Delhi.
