= Navy Day (India) =

Annual celebration

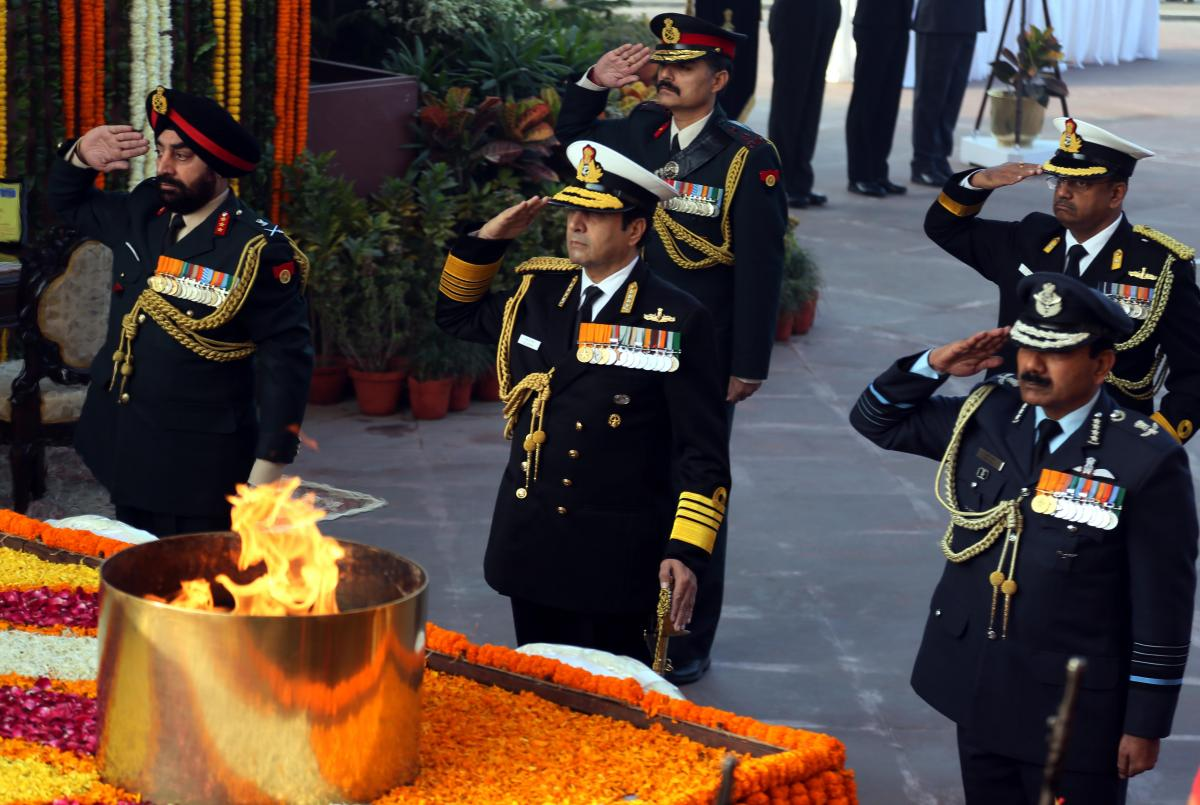
- The three chiefs paying homage at Amar Jawan Jyoti on Navy Day 2015
- Status: Active
- Date: 4 December
- Frequency: Annually
- Location: India
- Country: India
- Theme for 2023 is: Operational Efficiency, Readiness, and Mission Accomplishment in the Maritime Domain

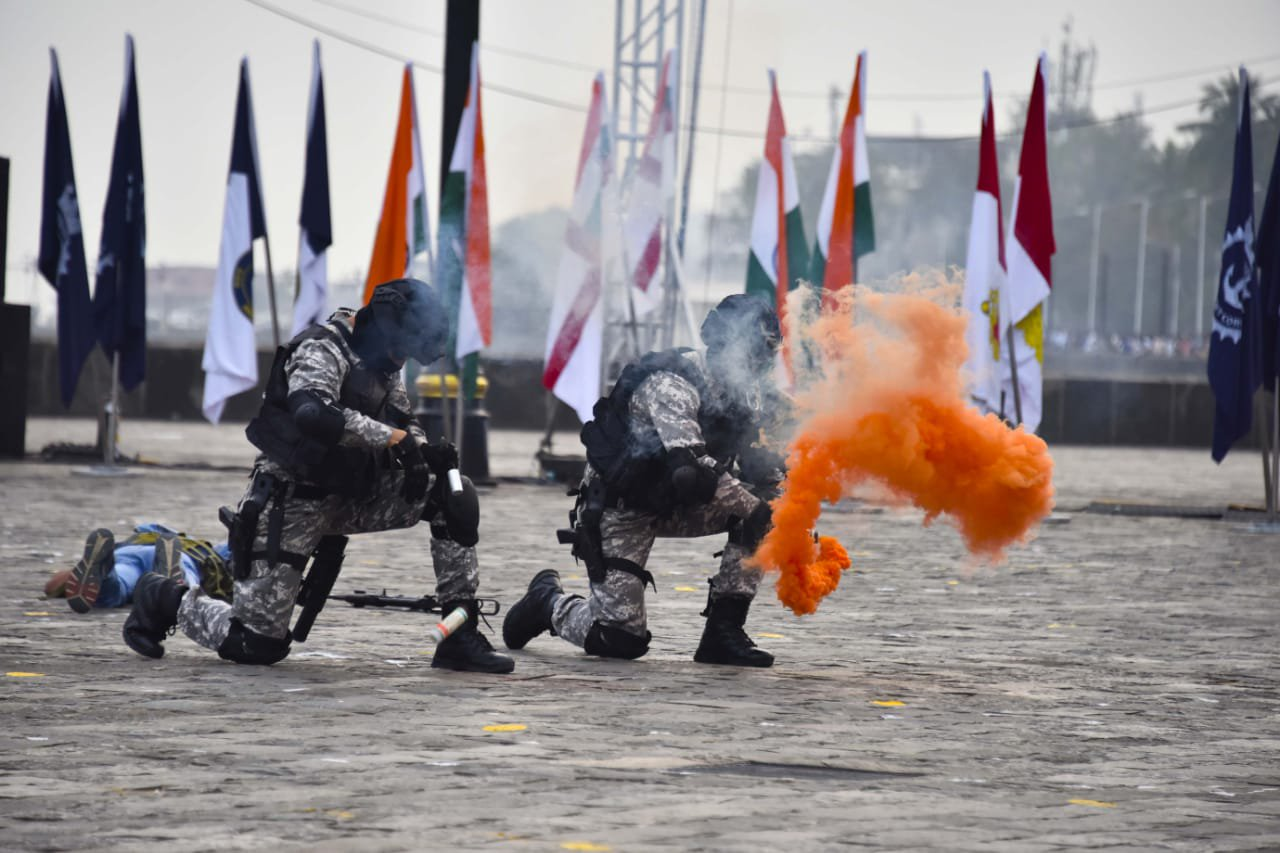
A demonstration by MARCOS during Navy Day 2018

Navy Day in India is celebrated on 4 December every year to recognize the achievements of the Indian Navy and its role in the country. 4 December was chosen as on that day in 1971, during Operation Trident, the Indian Navy sank four Pakistani vessels including PNS Khaibar, defeating the Pakistani Navy. On this day, those killed in the Indo-Pakistan War of 1971 are also remembered.

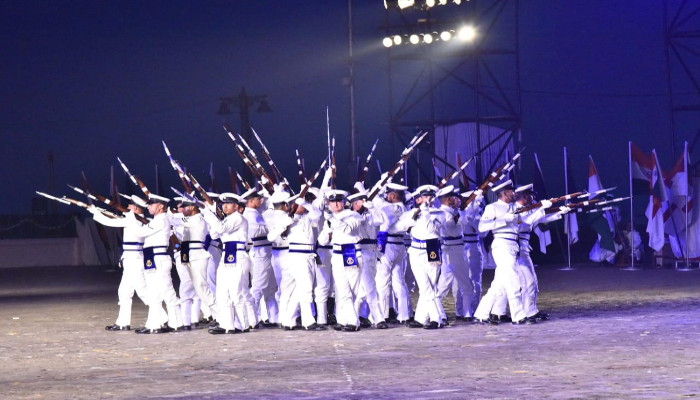
Beating Retreat and Tattoo ceremony on Navy Day 2018

During the days leading up to Navy Day, during Navy Week and the days prior to that, various events take place such as an open sea swimming competition, ships are open for visitors and school children, there is a veteran sailors lunch, performances by the Naval Symphonic Orchestra take place, an Indian Navy Inter School Quiz Competition happens, a Navy Half Marathon as well as an air display for school children and the beating retreat and tattoo ceremonies happen.

== Overview ==
=== Background ===
The Indian Navy is the naval branch of the Indian Armed Forces and is led by the President of India as Commander-in-Chief. The Indian Navy has an important role in securing the marine borders of the country as well as enhancing the international relations of India through seaport visits, joint exercises, humanitarian calamity relief and so on. The modern Indian Navy is undergoing a speedy renovation in order to improve its position in the Indian Ocean region. The strength of the Indian Navy includes over 67,000 personnel and about 150 ships and submarines.

=== Reason for celebrating Navy Day ===
Navy Day in India originally coincided with the Royal Navy's Trafalgar Day on 21 October. The Royal Indian Navy celebrated Navy Day for the first time on 21 October 1944. The idea behind celebrating Navy Day was to boost outreach and increase awareness about the Navy amongst the general public. Navy Day celebrations traditionally witnessed parades at various port cities as well as organizing public meetings at inland Naval establishments. From 1945 onwards, after World War II, Navy Day was celebrated on 1 December. On the night of 30 November 1945, on the eve of the Navy Day celebrations, Indian ratings painted the slogans such as Inqualab Zindabad. In due course and until 1972, given the enthusiasm among the public, Navy Day was celebrated on 15 December, and the week in which 15 December fell was observed as Navy Week. In 1972, old traditions gave way to new reasons to celebrate the day. At the Senior Naval Officer's Conference in May 1972, it was decided that Navy Day would be celebrated on 4 December to commemorate the actions of the Indian Navy during the 1971 Indo-Pakistan War, and Navy Week would be observed from 1 to 7 December.

Navy Day in India is now celebrated to commemorate Operation Trident, which was the attack on the Karachi harbor during the Indo-Pakistan war (on 4 December 1971) by the Indian Naval Missile boats as well in to reverence all the martyrs of that war. During the attack, Indian sailors communicated in Russian to avoid detection. No Indian sailors were killed in the attack. "Covid-19 and Chinese attempts to change status quo along northern borders have posed new challenges. The Navy is ready to face both these challenges," Admiral Karambir Singh, the Navy chief said at a press conference on the eve of Navy Day, 2020.

=== Navy Week Celebrations ===
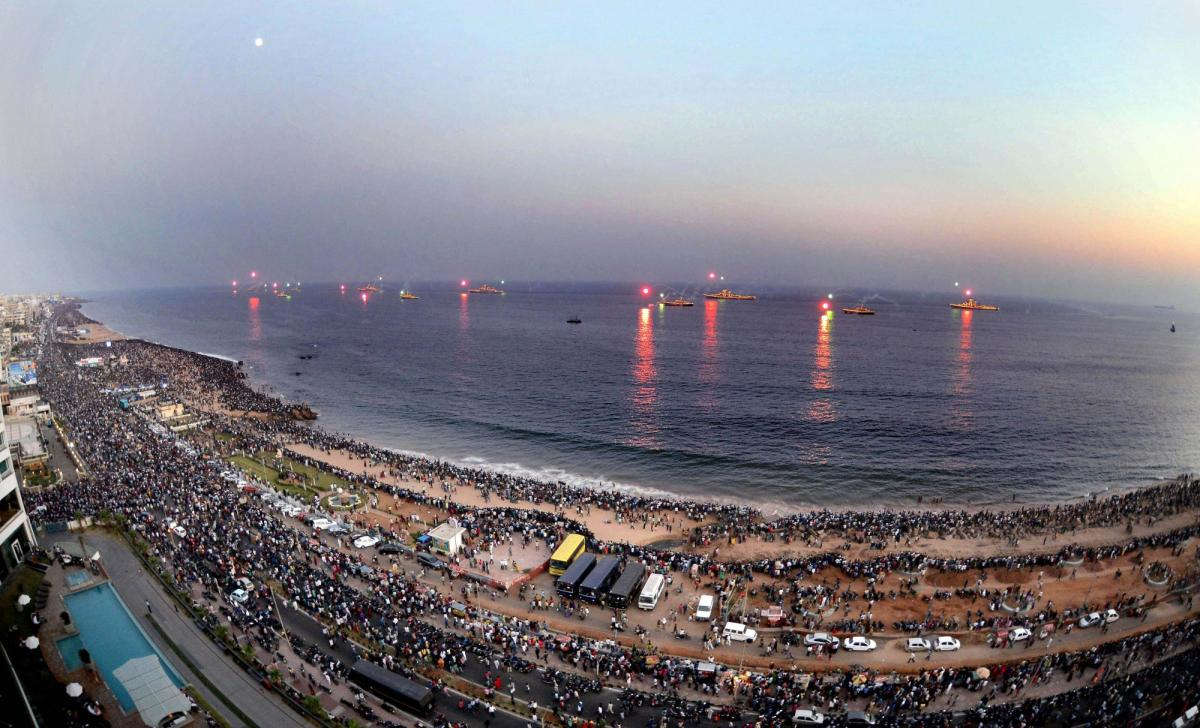
Aerial view of celebrations on Navy Day 2014

Various events take place during Navy Week with the finale on Navy Day. On this day the warships and aircraft of the Indian Navy are open to visitors such as school children. The Military Photo Exhibition is also performed by photojournalists of the Ernakulum in the Navy fest. Other events such as blood donation camps are also held. A community service for the Indian Navy is conducted by the Naval Institute of Aeronautical Technology (NIAT) at Good Hope Old Age Home, Fort Kochi in which the students from the Navy Children School Chair take turns to entertain the inmates and Naval doctors (from INHS Sanjivani) provides medical checkup to the inmates. The Navy Ball and Navy Queen contests including the Navy fest are held to celebrate Navy Day. Year 2020 celebrations will take the viewers to a 360 degree Virtual Reality Tour of the INS Vikramaditya, commissioned on 16 November 2013.

=== Themes ===
It is celebrated using a particular theme (like "Safe Seas and Secure Coasts for a strong Nation") of the year:

- Theme of Navy Day 2021 is "Swarnim Vijay Varsh".
- Theme of 2020 was, "Indian Navy Combat Ready, Credible & Cohesive".
- Theme of 2019 was "Indian Navy – Silent, Strong and Swift".
- Theme of 2018 was "Indian Navy, Mission-deployed and Combat-ready".
- Theme of 2015 was "Indian Navy – Ensuring Secure Seas for a Resurgent Nation."
- Theme of 2014 was "Indian Navy – Ensuring Secure Seas for a Resurgent Nation."
- Theme of 2012 was "Indian Navy – Maritime Power for National Prosperity".
- Theme of 2008 was "Reaching Out to Maritime Neighbours".

== Gallery ==
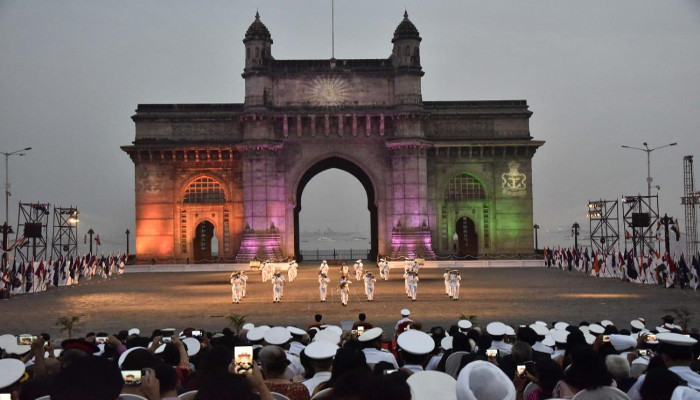
The Gateway of India during Navy Day 2018

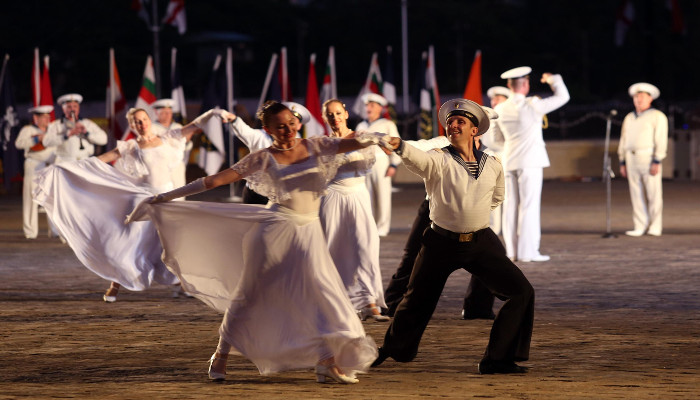
Russian Navy band at Navy Day 2019

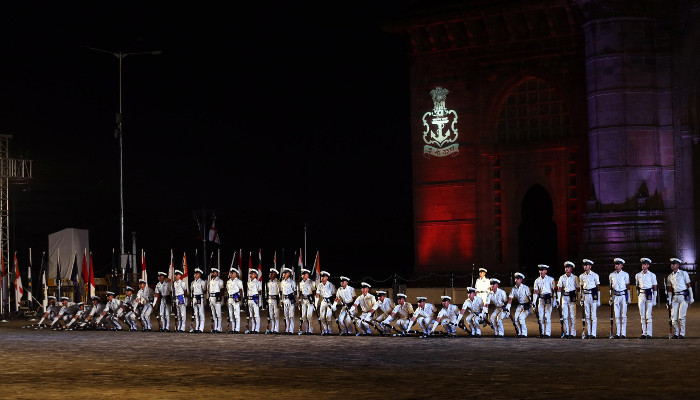
Indian Navy drill team during Navy Day 2019

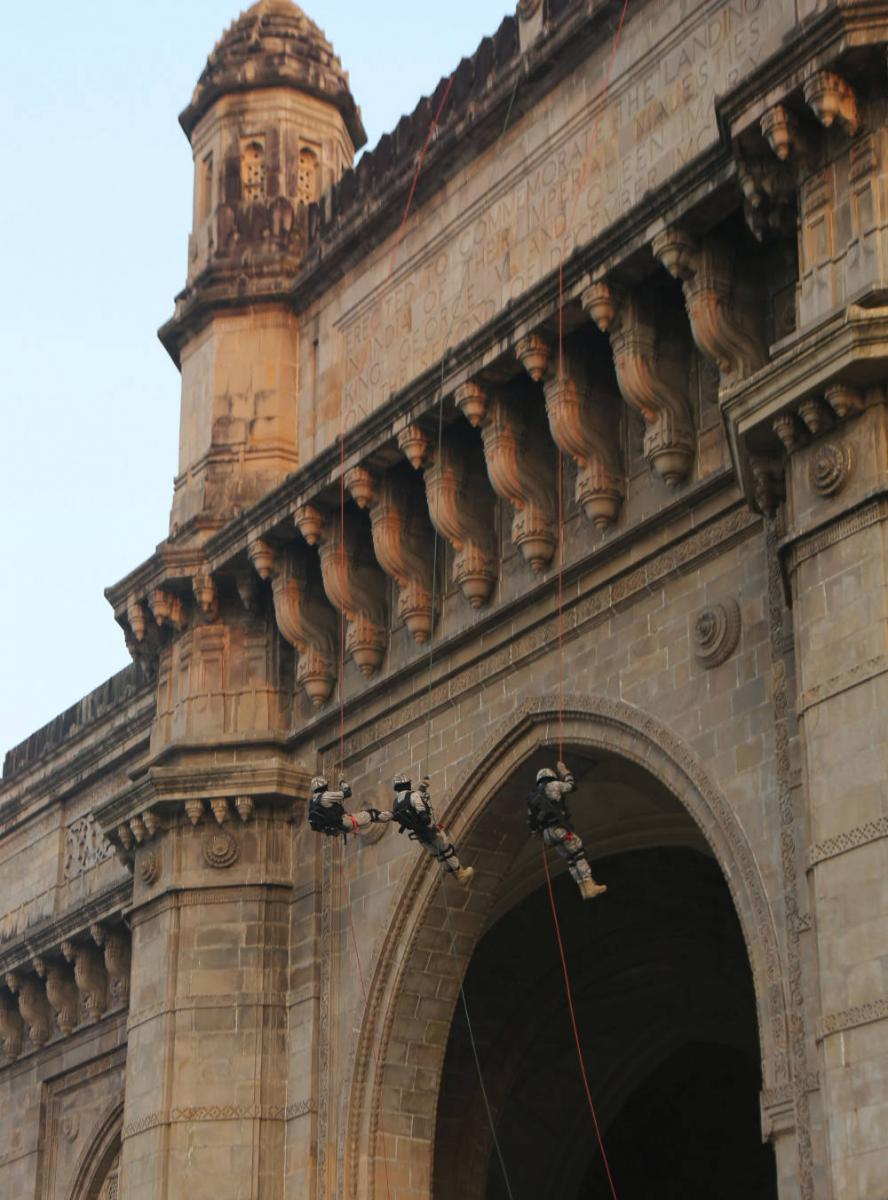
Indian Navy personnel rappelling down the Gateway of India

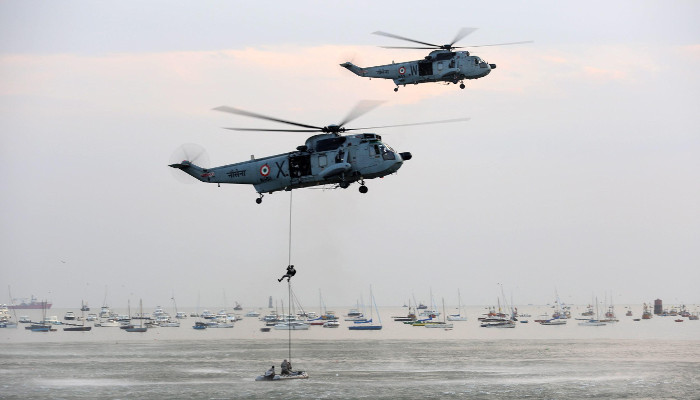
MARCOS slithering down from a helicopter at Navy Day 2019

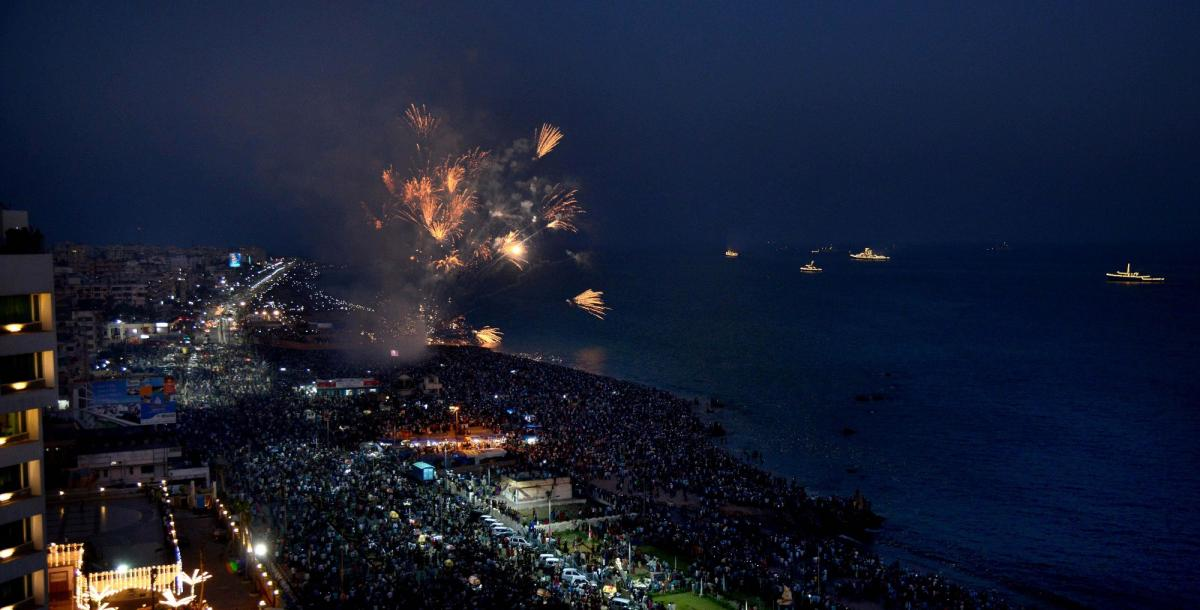
Fire works and ships in the background on Navy Day 2014

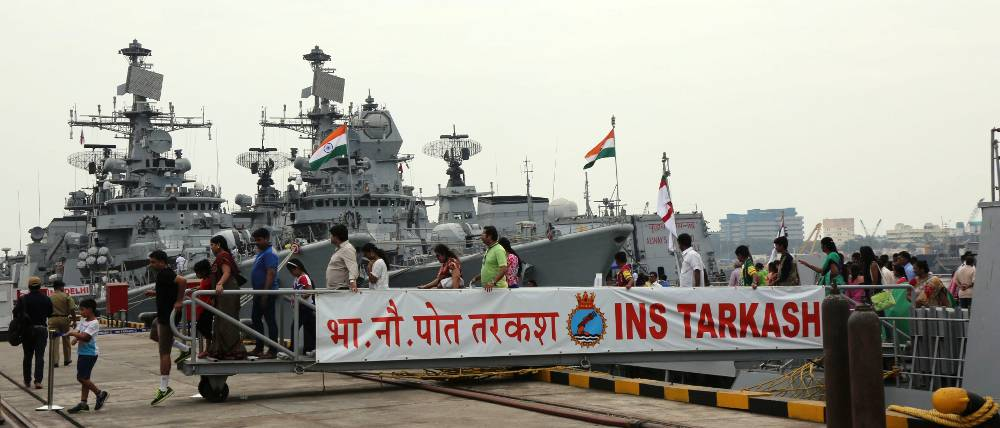
People visiting INS vessels as a part of Navy Day 2015 celebrations

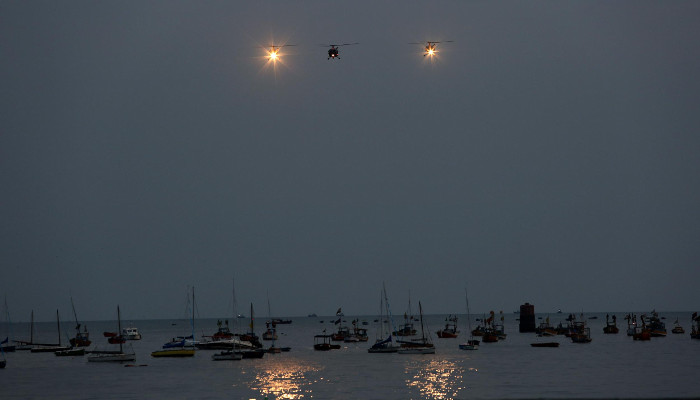
A flypast at Navy Day 2019
