= Kargil Vijay Diwas =

Indian memorial day

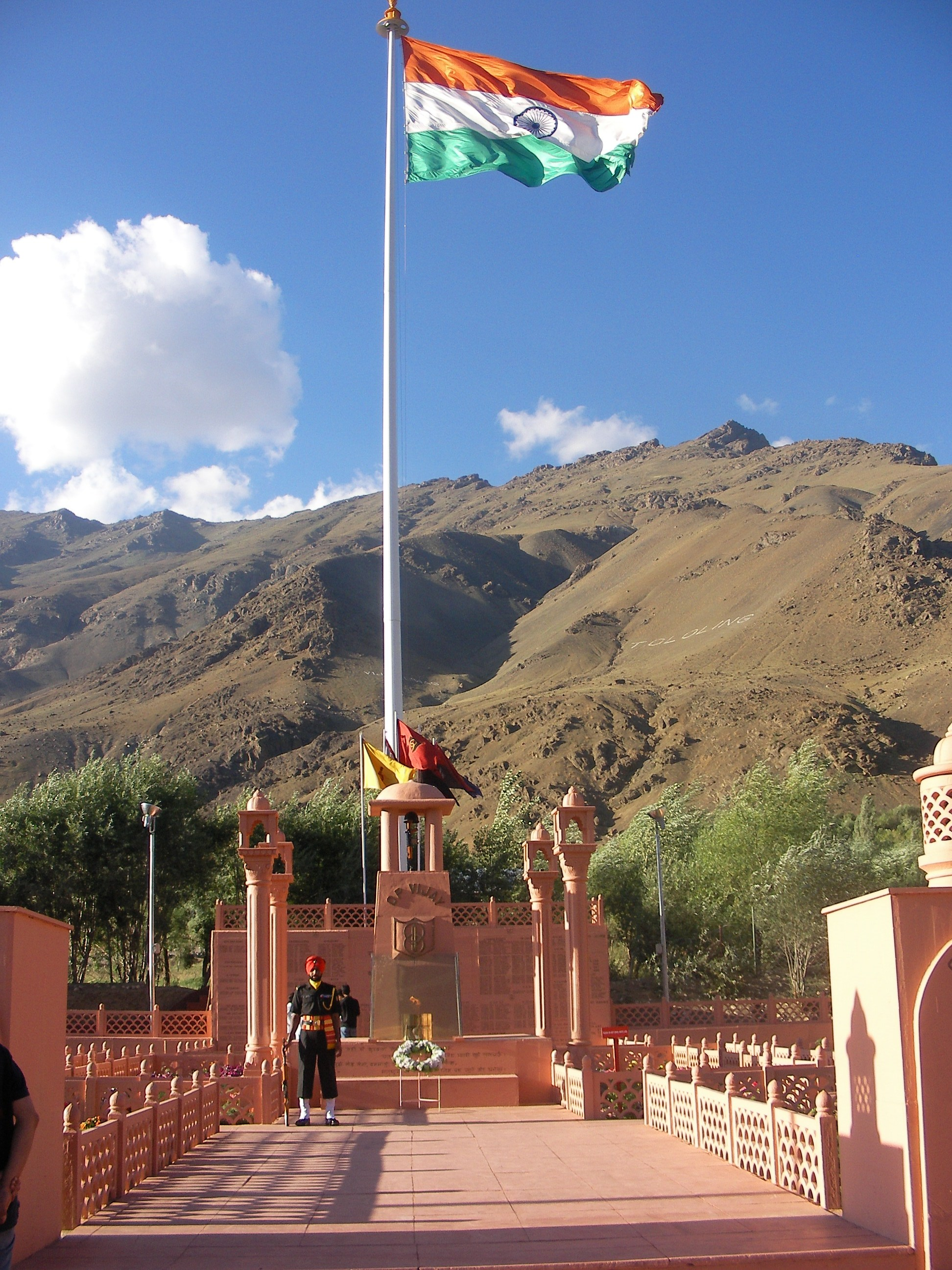
- Kargil War Memorial
- Official name: Kargil Vijay Diwas
- Also called: Kargil Victory Day
- Observed by: India
- Significance: Commemorate Victory and end of the Kargil War
- Observances: India's victory over Pakistan in the Kargil War in 1999; In the honour of the soldiers who fought in the Kargil War
- Date: 26 July (Victory of Kargil war)
- Duration: 1 year
- Frequency: Annual

Kargil Vijay Diwas (lit. 'Kargil Victory Day') is celebrated every year on 26 of July in India, to observe India's victory over Pakistan in the Kargil War for ousting Pakistani Forces from their occupied positions on the mountain tops of Northern Kargil District in Ladakh in 1999. Initially, the Pakistani army denied their involvement in the war, claiming that it was caused by the Kashmiri militants. However documents left behind by casualties, testimony of POWs and later statements by the Prime Minister of Pakistan Nawaz Sharif and Pakistan Army Chief of Army Staff Pervez Musharraf pointed to the involvement of the Pakistani paramilitary forces, led by General Ashraf Rashid.

Kargil Vijay Diwas is celebrated on 26 July every year in honour of the soldiers who fought in the Kargil War. This day is celebrated all over India and in the national capital of New Delhi, where the Prime Minister of India pays homage to the soldiers at Amar Jawan Jyoti at the India Gate every year. Functions are also organized all over the country to commemorate the contributions of the Indian Armed Forces.

== History ==
After the Indo-Pakistani War of 1971, there had been a long period of relatively few direct armed conflicts involving the military forces of the two neighbours – not withstanding the efforts of both nations to control the Siachen Glacier by establishing military outposts on the surrounding mountains ridges and the resulting military skirmishes in the 1980s. During the 1990s, however, escalating tension and conflict due to separatist activities in Kashmir, as well as the conducting of nuclear tests by both countries in 1998, led to an increasingly belligerent atmosphere.

In this situation, both countries signed the Lahore Declaration in February 1999, promising to provide a peaceful and bilateral solution to the Kashmir conflict. During the winter of 1998–1999, some elements of the Pakistani Armed Forces were covertly training and sending Pakistani troops and paramilitary forces, into territory on the Indian side of the line of control (LOC). The infiltration was code-named "Operation Badri". The aim of the Pakistani incursion was to sever the link between Kashmir and Ladakh and cause Indian forces to withdraw from the Siachen Glacier, thus forcing India to negotiate a settlement of the broader Kashmir dispute. Pakistan also believed that any tension in the region would internationalize the Kashmir issue, helping it to secure a speedy resolution. Yet another goal may have been to boost the morale of the decade-long rebellion in the Indian State of Kashmir by taking a proactive role.

Initially, with little knowledge of the nature and extent of the infiltration, the Indian troops in the area assumed that the infiltrators were jihadis and declared that they would evict them within a few days. The subsequent discovery of infiltration elsewhere along the LOC, along with the difference in tactics employed by the infiltrators, caused the Indian army to realize that the plan of attack was on a much bigger scale. The total area seized by the ingress is generally accepted to between 130 km^{2} – 200 km^{2}. The Government of India responded with Operation Vijay, a mobilization of 200,000 Indian troops. The war came to an official end on July 26, 1999, with the eviction of Pakistan Army troops from their occupied positions, thus marking it as Kargil Vijay Diwas. 527 soldiers from the Indian Armed Forces lost their lives during the war.

== See also ==
- Vijay Diwas (India)
- Victory Day in other countries
- Kargil War
- Operation Vijay
- Operation Safed Sagar
- Kargil War Memorial
- India's victory over Pakistan in the 1999 Kargil War
