= Oppenheimer (film) =

2023 film by Christopher Nolan

- Theatrical release poster
- Directed by: Christopher Nolan
- Screenplay by: Christopher Nolan
- Based on: American Prometheus by: Kai Bird; Martin J. Sherwin
- Produced by: Emma Thomas; Charles Roven; Christopher Nolan
- Starring: Cillian Murphy; Emily Blunt; Matt Damon; Robert Downey Jr.; Florence Pugh; Josh Hartnett; Casey Affleck; Rami Malek; Kenneth Branagh
- Cinematography: Hoyte van Hoytema
- Edited by: Jennifer Lame
- Music by: Ludwig Göransson
- Production companies: Universal Pictures; Syncopy; Atlas Entertainment
- Distributed by: Universal Pictures
- Release dates: July 11, 2023 (Le Grand Rex); July 21, 2023 (United States and United Kingdom)
- Running time: 180 minutes
- Countries: United States; United Kingdom
- Language: English
- Budget: $100 million
- Box office: $983.1 million

Oppenheimer is a 2023 epic biographical thriller film written, co-produced, and directed by Christopher Nolan. It follows the life of J. Robert Oppenheimer, the American theoretical physicist who led the development of the first nuclear weapons during World War II. Based on the 2005 biography American Prometheus by Kai Bird and Martin J. Sherwin, the film dramatizes Oppenheimer's studies, his direction of the Los Alamos Laboratory and his 1954 security hearing. Cillian Murphy stars as Oppenheimer, alongside an ensemble supporting cast that includes Emily Blunt, Matt Damon, Robert Downey Jr., Florence Pugh, Josh Hartnett, Casey Affleck, Rami Malek, and Kenneth Branagh.

Oppenheimer was announced in September 2021. It was Nolan's first film not distributed by Warner Bros. Pictures since Memento (2000), due to his conflicts regarding the studio's simultaneous theatrical and HBO Max release schedule. Murphy was the first cast member to join, with the rest joining between November 2021 and April 2022. Pre-production began by January 2022, and filming took place from February to May. The cinematographer, Hoyte van Hoytema, used a combination of IMAX 65 mm and 65 mm large-format film, including, for the first time, selected scenes in IMAX black-and-white film photography. As with many of his previous films, Nolan used extensive practical effects and claimed minimal use of compositing; despite these claims, the final film contained several hundred VFX shots made by a mostly uncredited VFX crew of around 160.

Oppenheimer premiered at Le Grand Rex in Paris on Tuesday, July 11, 2023, and was theatrically released in the United States and the United Kingdom on July 21 by Universal Pictures. Its concurrent release with Warner Bros.'s Barbie was the catalyst of the "Barbenheimer" phenomenon, encouraging audiences to see both films as a double feature. Oppenheimer received widespread critical acclaim and grossed over $983 million worldwide, becoming the third-highest-grossing film of 2023. It was the highest-grossing biographical film of all time until being overtaken by Michael in 2026.

The recipient of many accolades, Oppenheimer was nominated for thirteen awards at the 96th Academy Awards and won seven, including Best Picture, Best Director (Nolan), Best Actor (Murphy), and Best Supporting Actor (Downey). It also won five Golden Globe Awards (including Best Motion Picture – Drama) and seven British Academy Film Awards (including Best Film), and was named one of the top 10 films of 2023 by the National Board of Review and the American Film Institute.

== Plot ==
In the 1930s, J. Robert Oppenheimer teaches at the California Institute of Technology and the University of California, Berkeley after studying theoretical physics in Europe. A number of Berkeley academics are also Communist Party members, but Oppenheimer does not join himself.

After World War II breaks out, Ernest Lawrence of the Radiation Lab cautions Oppenheimer against having communist connections. Oppenheimer scales back and is later approached by General Leslie Groves to lead the Manhattan Project. Oppenheimer proposes a new laboratory at Los Alamos, New Mexico, where they could endeavor to build an atomic bomb before the Nazis. Edward Teller is recruited to Los Alamos and theorizes that an explosion could cause global atmospheric ignition. When his theory is disproved, he starts researching fusion-based weapons instead of working on the proposed fission bombs.

In July 1945, the US Army successfully conducts the Trinity test, the first detonation of a nuclear weapon. Subsequently, the United States detonates two atomic bombs over the Japanese cities of Hiroshima and Nagasaki to conclude World War II. In the immediate aftermath, Oppenheimer meets with President Harry S. Truman, to whom he expresses his remorse on building the bomb. Truman absolves him of all responsibility, but is annoyed at Oppenheimer's remorse. Oppenheimer is labeled 'father of the atomic bomb', but his public stance in the post-war years changes towards nuclear non-proliferation.

In 1949, the Soviet Union successfully tests a plutonium bomb, similar to one developed at Los Alamos. In a meeting of top advisors, Oppenheimer frustrates Atomic Energy Commission (AEC) chairman Lewis Strauss by favoring arms talks with Russia instead of escalating with Teller's proposed thermonuclear weapons. During a heated period of discussion, Oppenheimer's past security lapses are brought up, including rekindling an affair with Communist ex-lover, Jean Tatlock, immediately after gaining his security clearance in 1942. Oppenheimer had also protected his friend Haakon Chevalier from an espionage investigation, by directly lying to security officer Boris Pash.

In 1954, irritated at constantly being undermined by Oppenheimer, Strauss conspires with staunch anti-communist William Borden to initiate a security clearance hearing for Oppenheimer. He appoints Roger Robb as the board's counsel, who replays the accusations of Oppenheimer's disloyalty towards the US. Groves, Isidor Rabi, and Oppenheimer's wife Kitty testify in favor of Oppenheimer, but Teller and Borden testify against him. In the end, Oppenheimer's Q clearance is revoked by a two-to-one decision of the hearing's three judges, ending his government advisory role.

In 1959, Strauss is nominated as US Secretary of Commerce, which the US Senate is expected to confirm as per tradition. During his Senate confirmation hearing, Strauss is questioned over his actions relating to Oppenheimer's security hearing. Strauss alleges that the FBI was suspicious of Oppenheimer since his teaching days, well before Borden accused him of espionage in 1954. Strauss claims to not have acted against Oppenheimer through the security hearing, despite having many public disagreements with him. Strauss further alleges that Oppenheimer turned scientists against him, starting with Albert Einstein at Princeton University in 1947. Teller testifies in Strauss' favor, with Physicist David L. Hill of the Chicago Met Lab expected to follow suit. However, Hill instead exposes Strauss' personal vendetta and claims that the scientific community is against Strauss. Shortly afterward, the Senate rejects Strauss' nomination.

While Oppenheimer receives the Enrico Fermi Award in 1963, a flashback reveals he never mentioned Strauss during his 1947 conversation with Einstein. Instead, he admits to Einstein that the global catastrophe they feared, and then believed was averted, was now ironically inevitable.

== Cast ==
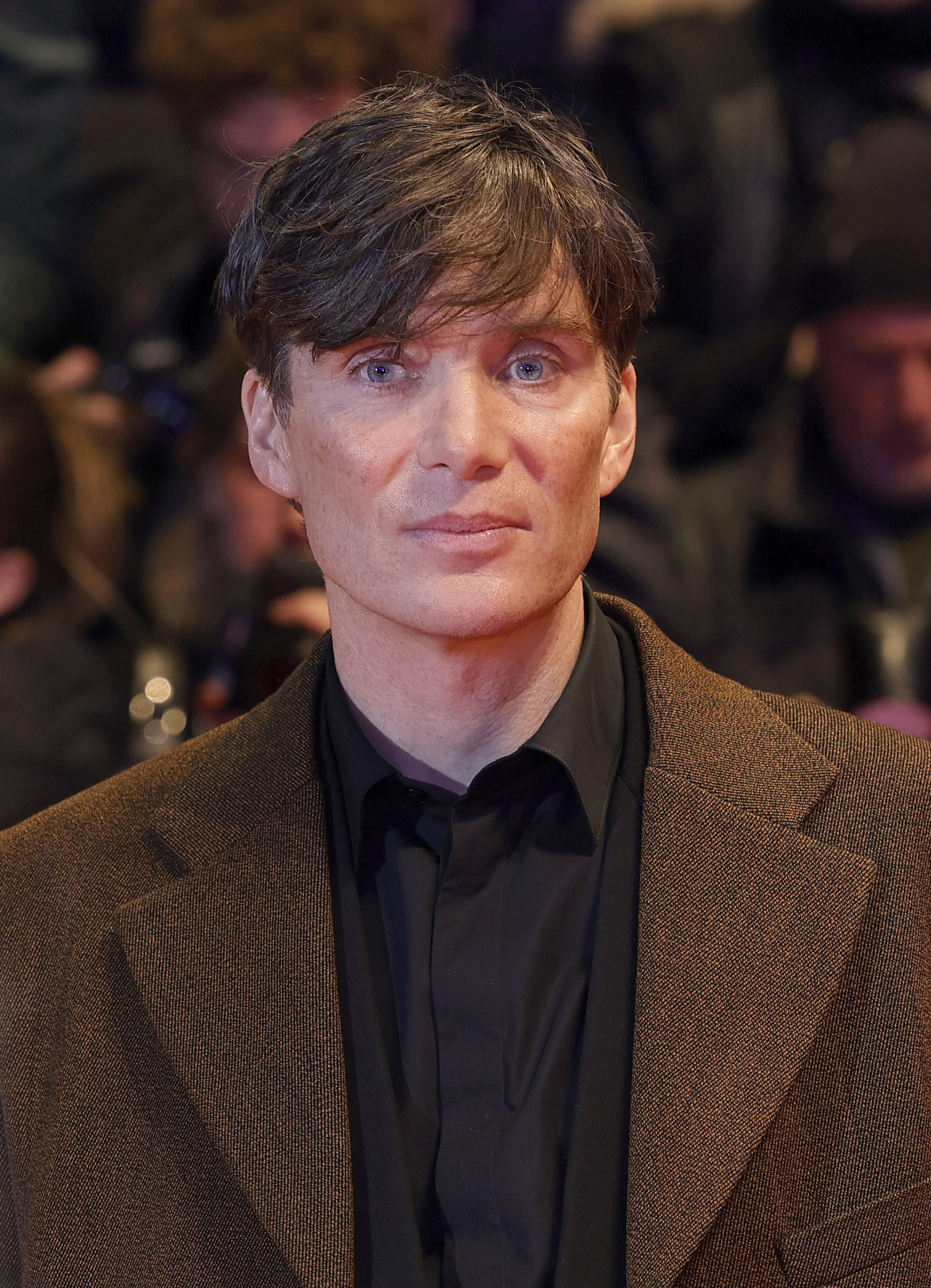
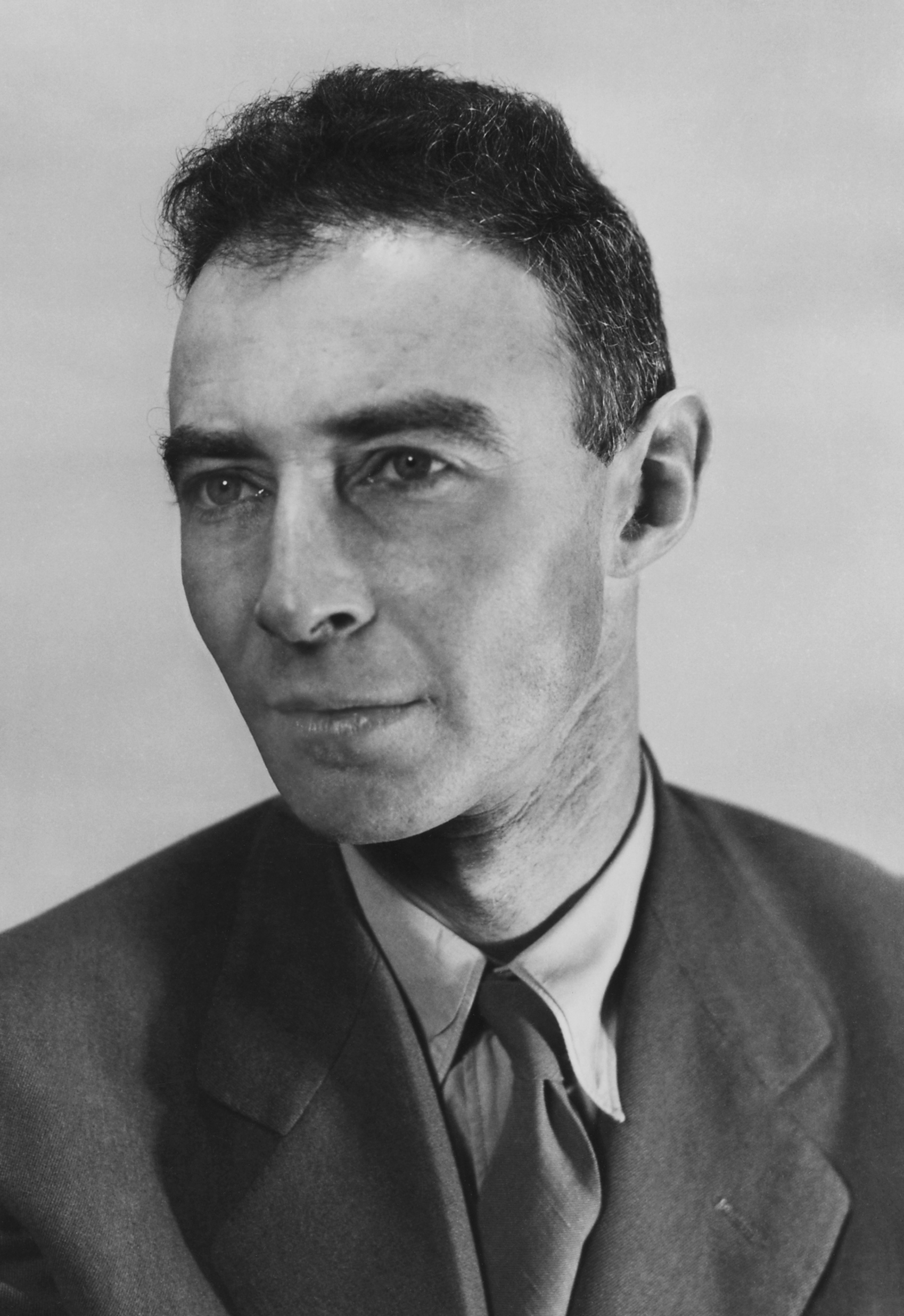
Cillian Murphy (left) plays J. Robert Oppenheimer.
- Cillian Murphy as J. Robert Oppenheimer, a theoretical physicist and director of the Los Alamos Laboratory
- Emily Blunt as Katherine "Kitty" Oppenheimer, Robert Oppenheimer's wife and a former Communist Party USA member
- Matt Damon as Gen. Leslie Groves, a United States Army Corps of Engineers (USACE) officer and director of the Manhattan Project
- Robert Downey Jr. as Rear Admiral Lewis Strauss, a retired Naval Reserve officer and high-ranking member of the US Atomic Energy Commission (AEC)
- Florence Pugh as Jean Tatlock, a psychiatrist, Communist Party USA member, and Robert Oppenheimer's romantic interest
- Josh Hartnett as Ernest Lawrence, a Nobel-winning nuclear physicist who worked with Oppenheimer at the University of California, Berkeley
- Casey Affleck as Boris Pash, a US Army military intelligence officer and commander of the Alsos Mission
- Rami Malek as David L. Hill, a nuclear physicist at the Metallurgical Laboratory, who helped to create the Chicago Pile
- Kenneth Branagh as Niels Bohr, a Nobel-winning Danish physicist, philosopher and Oppenheimer's personal idol
- Benny Safdie as Edward Teller, a Hungarian theoretical physicist known for being the "father of the hydrogen bomb"
- Jason Clarke as Roger Robb, an attorney and future US circuit judge who served as special counsel to the AEC at Oppenheimer's security hearing
- Dylan Arnold as Frank Oppenheimer, Robert's younger brother and a particle physicist who worked on the Manhattan Project
- Tom Conti as Albert Einstein, Nobel-winning German theoretical physicist known for developing the theory of relativity
- James D'Arcy as Patrick Blackett, Oppenheimer's doctoral supervisor and Nobel-winning physicist at Cambridge University
- David Dastmalchian as William L. Borden, a lawyer and executive director of the United States Congressional Joint Committee on Atomic Energy (JCAE)
- Dane DeHaan as Maj Gen. Kenneth Nichols, a United States Army Corps of Engineers (USACE) and the deputy district engineer of the Manhattan Project
- Alden Ehrenreich as a Senate aide to Lewis Strauss during Strauss's nomination for United States Secretary of Commerce
- Tony Goldwyn as Gordon Gray, a government official and chairman of the committee deciding the revoking of Oppenheimer security clearance
- Jefferson Hall as Haakon Chevalier ("Hoke"), a Berkeley professor who became friends with Oppenheimer at university, and was central to the Chevalier Incident
- David Krumholtz as Isidor Isaac Rabi, a Nobel Prize-winning physicist who worked as a consultant on the Manhattan Project
- Matthew Modine as Vannevar Bush, head of the Office of Scientific Research and Development
- Scott Grimes as Counsel to Lewis Strauss
- Kurt Koehler as Thomas A. Morgan, an industrialist and former chairman of the board of the Sperry Corporation who was one of the panel members at Oppenheimer's security clearance hearing
- John Gowans as Ward V. Evans, a chemist and academic who served as one of the panel members at Oppenheimer's security clearance hearing
- Macon Blair as Lloyd K. Garrison, a lawyer who helped to represent Oppenheimer at his security clearance hearing
- Gregory Jbara as Sen. Warren Magnuson, Chairman of Senate Commerce Committee
- Harry Groener as Sen. Gale W. McGee
- Tim DeKay as Sen. John Pastore
- Matthias Schweighöfer as Werner Heisenberg, a German Nobel Prize-winning physicist who worked in Germany's nuclear weapons program during World War II
- Alex Wolff as Luis Walter Alvarez, a Nobel-winning physicist who worked on the Manhattan Project
- Josh Zuckerman as Giovanni Rossi Lomanitz, a physicist who became Oppenheimer's protégé at Berkeley
- Rory Keane as Hartland Snyder, a physicist, who collaborated with Oppenheimer to calculate the gravitational collapse of a dust particle sphere
- Michael Angarano as Robert Serber, a physicist who worked on the Manhattan Project
- Britt Kyle as Barbara Chevalier, Hoke's wife
- Emma Dumont as Jackie Oppenheimer, Frank's wife and Robert's sister-in-law
- Guy Burnet as George C. Eltenton, a chemical engineer in the US with ties to the Soviet Union
- Louise Lombard as Ruth Tolman, a psychologist close to Oppenheimer during the development of the atomic bomb
- Tom Jenkins as Richard C. Tolman, Ruth's husband and General Groves' chief scientific adviser on the Manhattan Project
- Olli Haaskivi as Edward Condon, a nuclear physicist who helped with the development of radar and briefly took part in the Manhattan Project
- David Rysdahl as Donald Hornig, a chemist who worked on the firing unit at Los Alamos
- Josh Peck as Kenneth Bainbridge, a physicist who was the director of the Manhattan Project's Trinity nuclear test
- Jack Quaid as Richard Feynman, an American Nobel-winning theoretical physicist who worked in the Theoretical Division at Los Alamos
- Gustaf Skarsgård as Hans Bethe, a German-American Nobel-winning theoretical physicist and the head of the Theoretical Division at Los Alamos
- James Urbaniak as Kurt Gödel, an Austrian logician and mathematician known for his theorems that revolutionized mathematics and had far-reaching implications for philosophy and computer science
- Trond Fausa as George Kistiakowsky, a Ukrainian-born Harvard professor who took part in the Manhattan Project
- Devon Bostick as Seth Neddermeyer, a physicist who discovered the muon and advocated for the implosion-type nuclear weapon used in the Trinity Test
- Danny Deferrari as Enrico Fermi, an Italian Nobel-winning physicist and creator of the Chicago Pile
- Christopher Denham as Klaus Fuchs, a German-born physicist who worked on the Manhattan Project and spied for the Soviet Union
- Jessica Erin Martin as Charlotte Serber, head technical librarian at Los Alamos
- Ronald Auguste as J. Ernest Wilkins Jr., an African American nuclear scientist, mechanical engineer and mathematician who worked with Oppenheimer on the Manhattan Project
- Máté Haumann as Leo Szilard, a Hungarian physicist who conceived the idea of nuclear chain reaction in 1933, and later in July 1945 at the Chicago branch of the Manhattan Project circulated the petition to President Truman against unannounced use of atomic weapons on Japan
- Olivia Thirlby as Lilli Hornig, a Czech-American scientist who worked on the Manhattan Project
- Jack Cutmore-Scott as Lyall Johnson, a security officer at Berkeley who worked at the Manhattan Project
- Harrison Gilbertson as Philip Morrison, a physics professor who worked on the Manhattan Project
- James Remar as Henry L. Stimson, Secretary of War under President Truman
- Will Roberts as George C. Marshall, the United States Army Chief of Staff from 1939 to 1945
- Pat Skipper as James F. Byrnes, US Secretary of State and future Governor of South Carolina
- Gary Oldman as Harry S. Truman, the 33rd President of the United States who made the decision to drop the two atomic bombs on Hiroshima and Nagasaki in August 1945
- Hap Lawrence as Lyndon B. Johnson, the 36th President of the United States
- Troy Bronson as Joseph W. Kennedy, a chemist instrumental in the discovery of plutonium, and head of the Chemistry Department at Los Alamos

== Production ==
=== Development ===
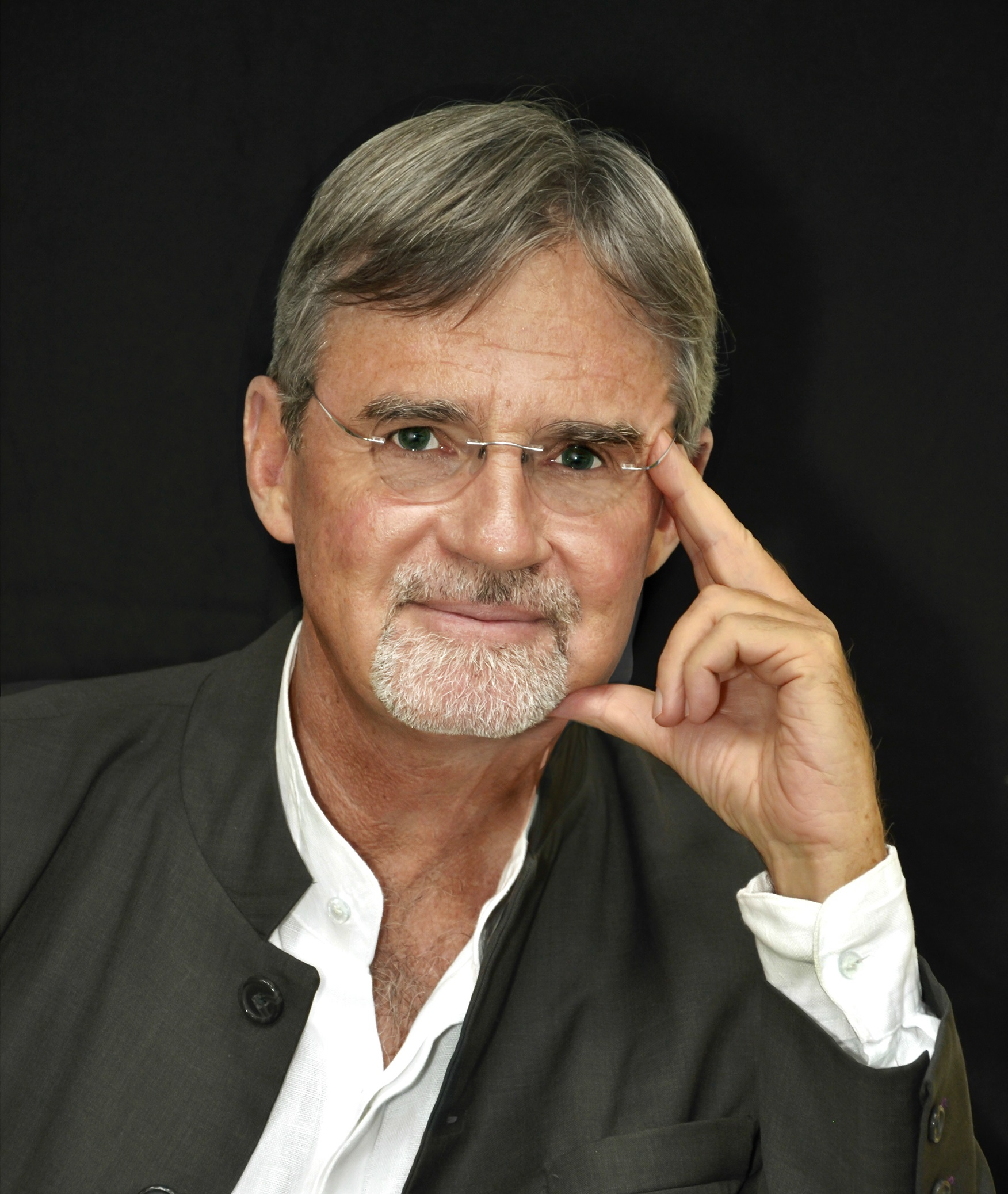
Kai Bird (pictured) and Martin J. Sherwin are the authors of J. Robert Oppenheimer's biography American Prometheus (2005), on which the film is based.

Director Sam Mendes was interested in adapting the 2005 J. Robert Oppenheimer biography American Prometheus by Kai Bird and Martin J. Sherwin. After that project failed to materialize, the book was optioned by various filmmakers over the next fifteen years. The authors became pessimistic about a film adaptation. Oliver Stone declined an opportunity to direct, saying "I couldn't find my way to its essence". In 2015, J. David Wargo optioned the book, then commissioned and rejected several scripts. During the COVID-19 pandemic, Wargo flew to Hollywood to meet with actor James Woods, who set up a meeting with Charles Roven, a producer for various Christopher Nolan films, and in turn, Roven gave a copy of the book to Nolan. Both Wargo and Woods are executive producers of the film. Woods said he was asked not to promote the film because his outspoken political views posed a risk to the film's commercial success and awards campaign.

Nolan had long desired to make a film about Oppenheimer, even prior to reading American Prometheus. In 2019, towards the end of production on Nolan's science-fiction film Tenet (2020), star Robert Pattinson gave him a book of Oppenheimer's speeches. According to Nolan, the speeches showed Oppenheimer "wrestling with the implications ... of what's happened and what [he's] done". Nolan wanted to depict "what it would have been like to be Oppenheimer in those moments", in contrast to Tenet, which employs time travel to curb a potential weapon of mass destruction.

In December 2020, Warner Bros. Pictures announced plans to give its 2021 films simultaneous releases in theaters and on HBO Max, citing the impact of the COVID-19 pandemic on the film industry. Nolan, who had partnered with Warner Bros. on each of his films since Insomnia (2002), was outraged, as he was a staunch supporter of traditional film exhibition. In January 2021, media reports mentioned the possibility that Nolan's next film could be the first not to be financed or distributed by Warner Bros. By mid-2021, Nolan had left Warner Bros. and was meeting with other studios to develop his new project. Nolan had previously supported Warner Bros.' decision to give Wonder Woman 1984 (2020) a simultaneous release, saying he felt that situation had been handled properly, but said he had been excluded from any discussions regarding the postponed release of Tenet.

In September 2021, it was announced that Nolan would write and direct a biographical film about Oppenheimer and his contributions to the Manhattan Project, with Cillian Murphy in negotiations to star. Due to his strained relationship with Warner Bros., Nolan approached multiple studios, including Sony, Universal, Paramount, and Apple. According to insiders, Paramount was ruled out early in the process due to the replacement of the CEO and chairman, Jim Gianopulos, with Brian Robbins, an advocate for increased streaming-service releases.

Nolan signed with Universal because he had previously worked with Donna Langley, chairwoman and chief content officer of the NBCUniversal studio group, on an unsuccessful attempt to make a film version of the British television series The Prisoner. Langley agreed with Nolan's stance on traditional film exhibition and Universal agreed to finance and distribute Oppenheimer, with production set to begin in the first quarter of 2022. Universal also agreed to Nolan's terms, which included a production budget of $100 million, an equal marketing budget, an exclusive theatrical window ranging from 90 to 120 days, 20% of the film's first-dollar gross, and a three-week period both before and after the opening, in which Universal could not release another new film.

=== Writing ===
Nolan became aware of Oppenheimer as a youth, after hearing the lyric "How can I save my little boy from Oppenheimer's deadly toy?" in the Sting song "Russians" (1985). He was also inspired by his fears of nuclear holocaust throughout childhood, as he lived during the era of Campaign for Nuclear Disarmament (CND) and the anti-nuclear protests in RAF Greenham Common. He felt that "while our relationship with that [nuclear] fear has ebbed and flowed with time, the threat itself never actually went away", and felt the 2022 Russian invasion of Ukraine had caused a resurgence of nuclear anxiety. Nolan had also penned a script for a biopic of Howard Hughes approximately during the time of production of Martin Scorsese's The Aviator (2004), which had given him insight on how to write a script regarding a person's life. Emily Blunt described the Oppenheimer script as "emotional" and remarked that Nolan had "Trojan-Horsed a biopic into a thriller".

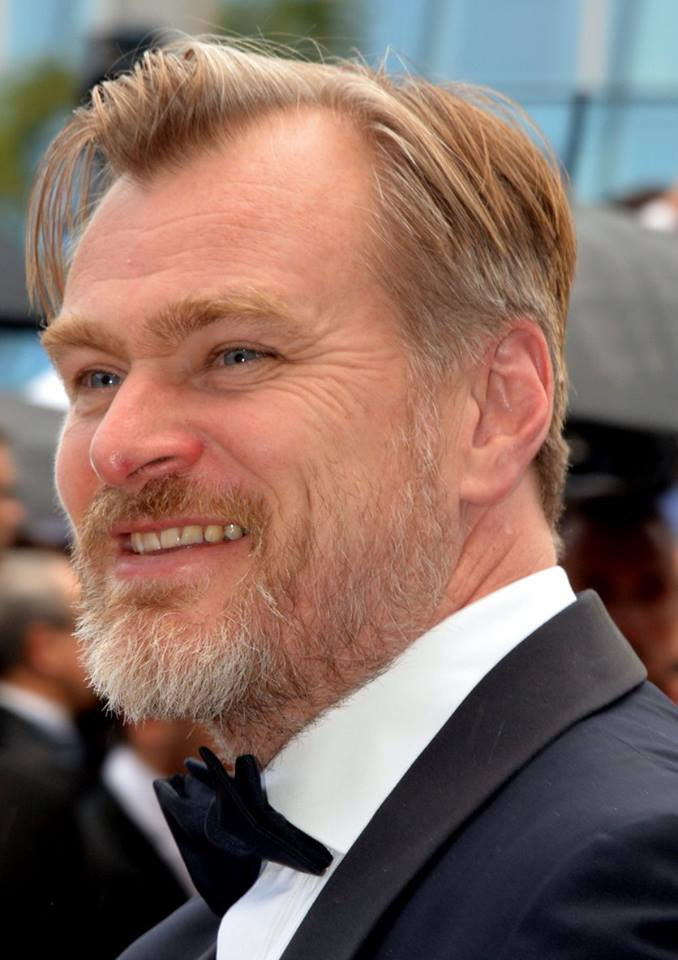
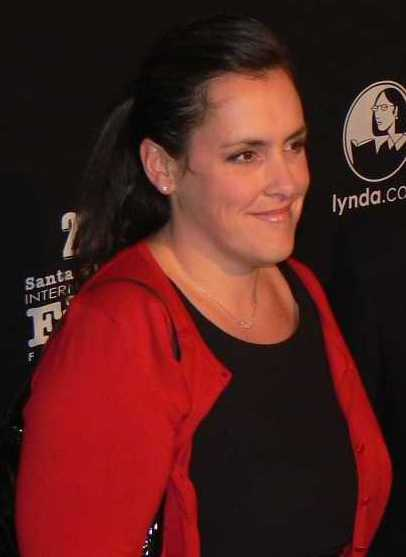
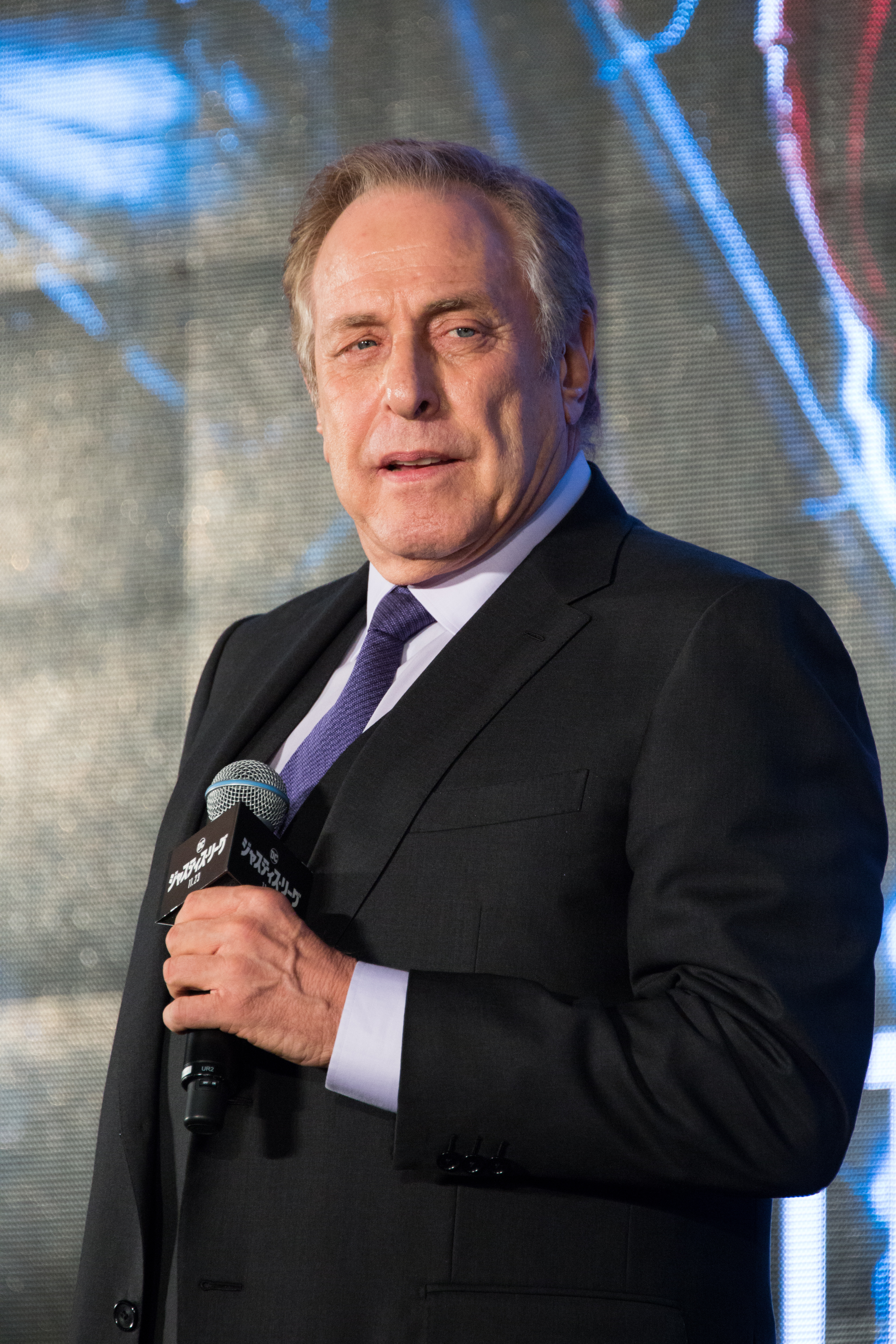
Writer, director, and producer Christopher Nolan (left) and co-producers Emma Thomas and Charles Roven

By September 2021, both Roven and Nolan had begun contacting Bird and Sherwin to discuss the script. During Bird's first meeting with Nolan, he had already written a spec script while they discussed the script's content, although Nolan did not disclose the script to them yet. Oppenheimer is the first screenplay written by Nolan in the first person, as he wanted the narrative to be conveyed from Oppenheimer's perspective. He described the "texture" of the film being "how the personal interacts with the historic and the geopolitical" with the intention of making it a cautionary tale. He began developing the script after he completed Tenet and wrote it in only a few months; he had already been thinking about making a film about Oppenheimer for over 20 years.

A major plot element is Oppenheimer's response to the long-term consequences of his actions. Nolan wished to explore the phenomenon of delayed reactions, as he felt people are not "necessarily confronted with the strongest or worst elements of [their actions] in the moment". He also chose to alternate between scenes in color and black-and-white to convey the story from both subjective and objective perspectives, respectively, with most of Oppenheimer's view shown via the former, while the latter depicts a "more objective view of his story from a different character's point of view". Wanting to make the film as subjective as possible, the production team decided to include visions of Oppenheimer's conceptions of the quantum world and waves of energy. Nolan noted that while Oppenheimer never publicly apologized for his role in the atomic bombings of Hiroshima and Nagasaki, he still believed Oppenheimer had felt genuine guilt for his actions and thus portrayed him as exhibiting those feelings.

I think of any character I've dealt with, Oppenheimer is by far the most ambiguous and paradoxical. Which, given that I've made three Batman films, is saying a lot.

— Christopher Nolan, Total Film

Nolan began by trying to find the "thread that connected the quantum realm, the vibration of energy, and Oppenheimer's own personal journey" and sought to portray the difficulties in his life, particularly regarding his sex life. As such, Nolan wanted to candidly portray his affair with Jean Tatlock. He also wanted to explore Tatlock's influence on Oppenheimer's life, since she was a Communist, which had "enormous ramifications for [Oppenheimer's] later life and his ultimate fate". Nolan also sought to explore the relationship between Oppenheimer and Admiral Lewis Strauss, former chair of the US Atomic Energy Commission, having been inspired by the relationship between Wolfgang Amadeus Mozart and Antonio Salieri as depicted in Amadeus (1984).

Another critical moment of the film was the meeting in which President Harry S. Truman called Oppenheimer a "crybaby". Nolan wanted to convey the scene from Oppenheimer's perspective and felt it was a "massive moment of disillusion, a huge turning point [for Oppenheimer] in his approach to trying to deal with the consequences of what he'd been involved with", while also underscoring that it is a "huge shift in perception about the reality of Oppenheimer's perception". He wanted to execute a quick tonal shift after the atomic bombings of Hiroshima and Nagasaki, desiring to go from the "highest triumphalism, the highest high, to the lowest low in the shortest amount of screen time possible". For the ending, Nolan chose to make it intentionally vague to be open to interpretation and refrained from being didactic or conveying specific messages in his work. However, he did have the intention to present a "strong set of troubling reverberations at the end".

=== Casting ===
Oppenheimer marks the sixth collaboration between Nolan and Cillian Murphy, and the first starring Murphy as the lead. To prepare for the role, Murphy read extensively on Oppenheimer's life and was inspired by David Bowie's appearance in the 1970s. Nolan called Murphy one day to ask him to play the part, and Murphy enthusiastically accepted, excited to play a lead role in a Nolan film. Afterward, Nolan flew to Dublin to meet with Murphy, who read the script in Nolan's hotel room. Murphy lost an undisclosed amount of weight for the role in order to better match the real-life Oppenheimer's gaunt appearance. Nolan also set up a phone call between Murphy and Nobel laureate Kip Thorne, who had previously worked with Nolan on Interstellar (2014). As a graduate student, Thorne had attended some of Oppenheimer's seminars, and explained to Murphy his experience with Oppenheimer's gift for facilitating group discussions of difficult scientific concepts.

The casting process was so secretive that some cast members did not know which role they would be playing until they signed on. Robert Downey Jr., Matt Damon, and Emily Blunt took pay cuts to work on the film, with each earning $4 million in lieu of their usual $10–20 million upfront salary. Downey went to Nolan's house to read the script, which was printed in black on red paper. Downey would later describe Oppenheimer as "the best film" in which he has appeared to date. Downey previously met with Nolan for the role of Jonathan Crane / Scarecrow in Batman Begins (2005), but Nolan felt Downey wasn't right for the role, which went to Murphy. Blunt met Nolan in Los Angeles and, when she was offered the role of Katherine "Kitty" Oppenheimer, she enthusiastically accepted; she also contacted Murphy to get an expectation of what working with Nolan would be like. Asked to play the part of Leslie Groves, Damon—who had appeared in Nolan's Interstellar—was taking a break from acting as a result of negotiations with his wife Luciana Bozán Barroso in couples therapy, but signed on to Oppenheimer as he had reserved one exception: if Nolan offered him a role in a film.

Nolan cast writer-director Benny Safdie as physicist Edward Teller after asking director Paul Thomas Anderson about his experience directing Safdie in Licorice Pizza (2021). Safdie had worked alongside a nuclear physicist at Columbia University while in high school. It is Nolan's first film since Insomnia (2002) to not feature Michael Caine. Glen Powell auditioned and was rejected for the role that went to Josh Hartnett. For Harry S. Truman's appearance, Nolan sought his collaborator Gary Oldman, who was on a break from filming the Apple TV+ series Slow Horses (2022–present); Oldman told Nolan that he was contractually obliged to not cut his hair, so either he could play Truman with a prosthetic cap and a wig or get someone else to play the part, which Nolan agreed.

=== Filming ===
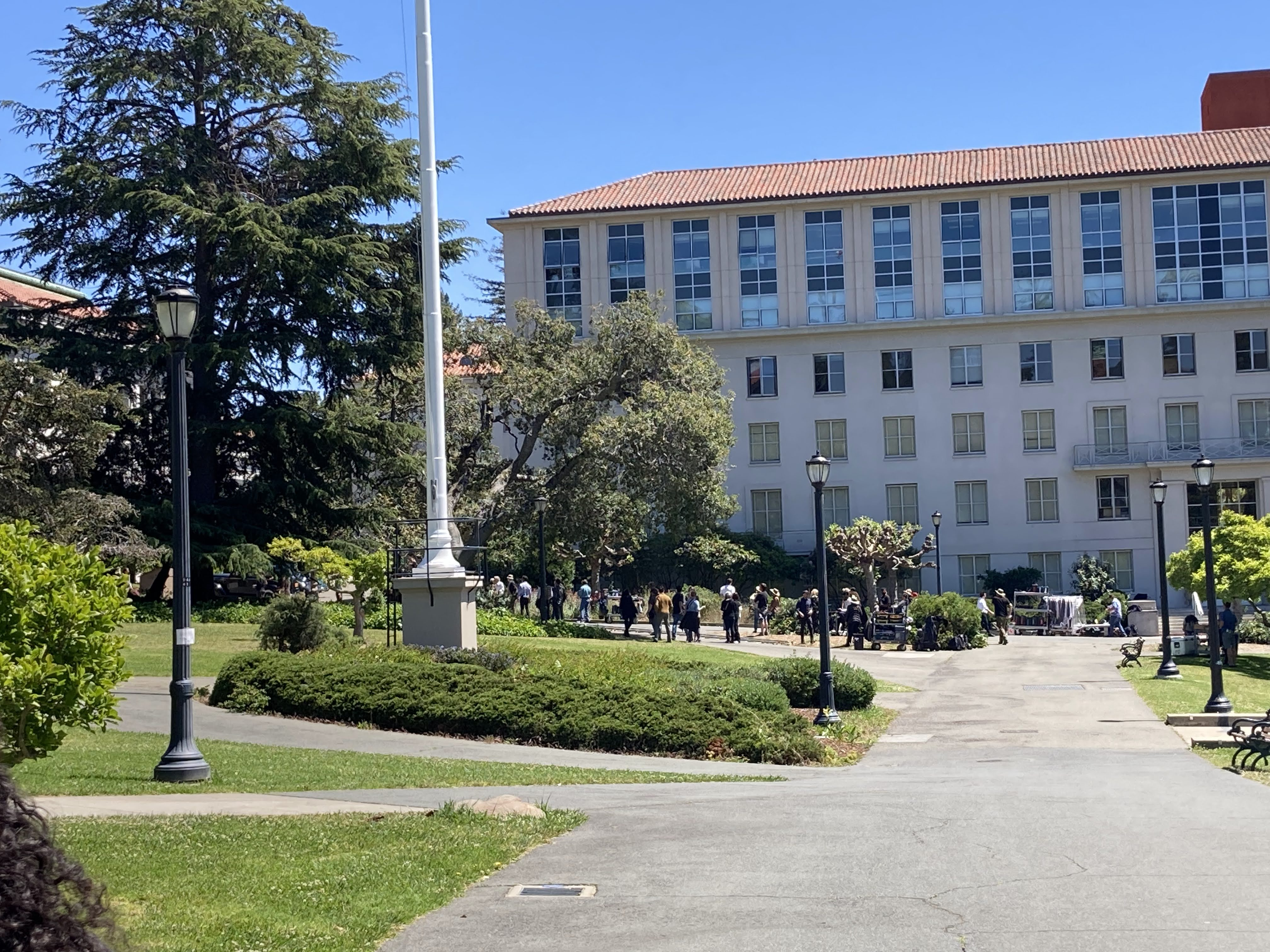
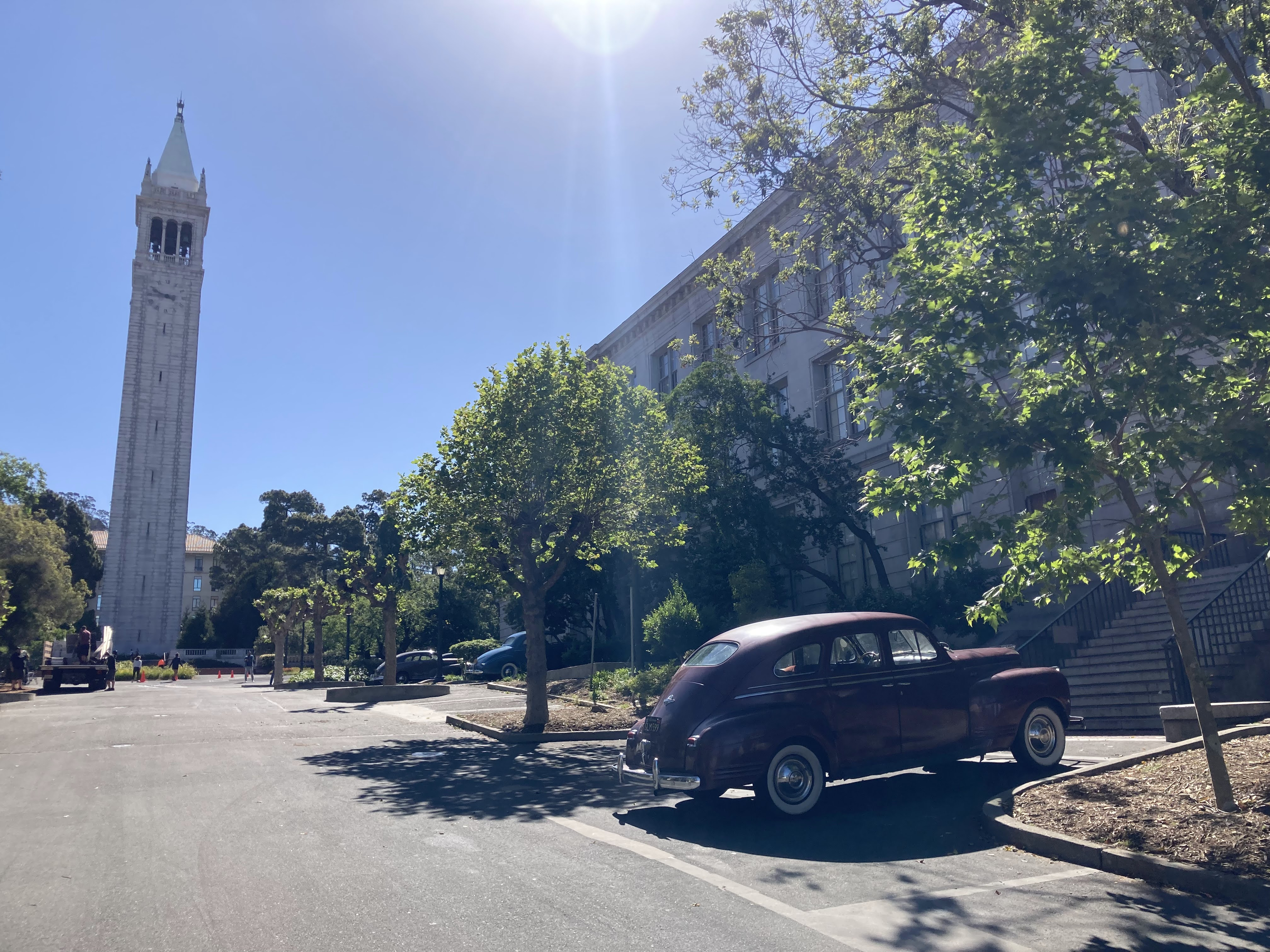
Filming at the University of California, Berkeley took place in May 2022.

Pre-production had begun by January 2022 in New Mexico, where a two-day casting call took place in Santa Fe and Los Alamos for people to audition to play local residents, military personnel, and scientists. Another casting call was held in February.

Principal photography began on February 28, 2022, at Ghost Ranch in New Mexico, and lasted for 57 days with Hoyte van Hoytema serving as cinematographer. The original shooting schedule had set aside approximately 85 days for filming. However, during pre-production, it had become clear that principal photography could not be completed within $100 million over that many days on location all over the United States. To efficiently use the budget for location shooting in California and New Jersey and constructing high-quality historically accurate sets in New Mexico, Nolan compressed the shooting schedule from 85 to 57 days. Murphy, who appears in nearly every scene, described the pace as "insane".

Oldman said he would be on set for a day in May for "one scene, a page and a half". The original choice for Oval Office location in the Nixon Presidential Library fell through a week before filming, and since Oldman's dates were unmovable, the production design team redressed the Oval Office set from the HBO series Veep (2012–2019), which according to Ruth De Jong had fallen into "nightmarish" disrepair. Nolan filmed his eldest child, his daughter Flora, in a scene in which she played a young woman disintegrated in a nuclear explosion. It appears in the film as one of Oppenheimer's visions, in which Nolan intended to show "that if you create the ultimate destructive power, it will also destroy those who are near and dear to you".

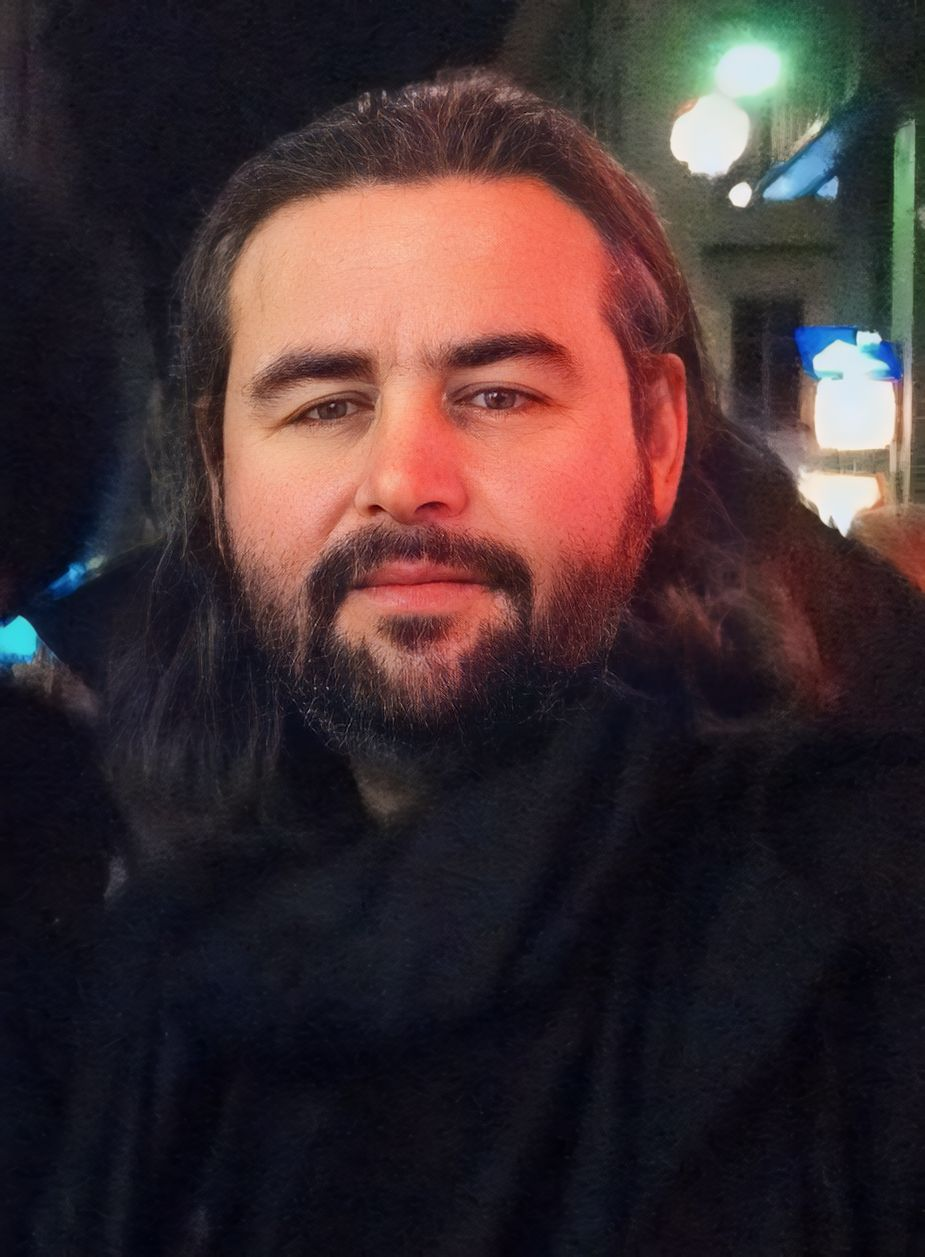
Cinematographer Hoyte van Hoytema won several awards for his work on Oppenheimer, including an Academy Award for Best Cinematography.

The film used a combination of IMAX 65 mm and 65 mm large-format film. It is also the first film to shoot sections on IMAX black-and-white photographic film, which Kodak created and FotoKem developed specifically for the film. Van Hoytema used 50 mm and 80 mm Hasselblad lenses when filming on the IMAX MKIV or IMAX MSM 9802 cameras, while scenes shot on the Panavision Panaflex System 65 Studio cameras were shot using Panavision Sphero 65 and Panavision System 65 lenses. Additionally, the production had Panavision construct a custom probe lens to allow the filmmakers to use IMAX cameras for macro photography and microphotography to record the miniature effects. Miniatures were filmed with IMAX cameras at 48 frames per second, while miniatures needing higher speed were shot on Super 35 mm film with an Arriflex 435 ES camera at 150 frames per second. In the second week of April, filming took place on location at the Institute for Advanced Study in Princeton, New Jersey. Filming also occurred in California, primarily around the campus of the University of California, Berkeley. Scenes set in the city of Berkeley itself were filmed in Pasadena.

During a 2021 research trip, Nolan discovered that Los Alamos had drastically changed from its 1940s appearance and could not be used for exterior shots of the town; for example, the town's equivalent of a Main Street has a Starbucks. Instead, the production team constructed a version of 1940s-era Los Alamos on top of a similar plateau at Ghost Ranch. It took three months to build the set, which was used for only six shooting days. The general plan was to shoot only exterior shots on the set at Ghost Ranch, then shoot interior shots on location inside various historic buildings in the real town of Los Alamos. Interior shooting in Los Alamos began on March 8, 2022. Many scenes in the film take place in academic lecture halls; to save time and money, the production team decided against attempting to reconstruct those halls as sets at Ghost Ranch, and shot them inside a historic Women's Army Corps dormitory in Los Alamos. Scenes were also filmed in Oppenheimer's original cabin in Los Alamos, which had been restored. Kai Bird visited the set and was impressed by Murphy's performance. The New York hotel scenes were shot in Albuquerque's Old Post Office building, while the Washington, D.C. scenes were shot in state government buildings in the state capital of Santa Fe.

Although the news coverage surrounding the film's release implied that most of the film was shot in New Mexico, the official making-of book Unleashing Oppenheimer revealed that many of the film's most important scenes were shot within the studio zone in Los Angeles County. Early on, three days were set aside for filming at UCLA's Kerckhoff Hall, which was used for both the Cambridge and Göttingen scenes. The Millennium Biltmore Hotel in Downtown Los Angeles stood in for the Mark Hopkins Hotel for one of Oppenheimer's encounters with Tatlock, for the Plaza Hotel for Strauss's 1949 birthday celebration, and for an unnamed Washington, D.C. hotel for the scene where Szilard and Hill try to get Oppenheimer to sign a petition against dropping the bomb on Japan. Oppenheimer's security hearing was shot in Alhambra, California, in a "disused office building in the former manufacturing headquarters for the petrochemical company C.F. Braun & Co." The scene in which Oppenheimer's security clearance was revoked was shot on May 19, 2022, the production's last day in Alhambra.

Filming involved the use of real explosives to recreate the Trinity nuclear test, forgoing the use of computer-generated graphics. When this news first broke online, many fans (aware of Nolan's famous preference for in-camera practical effects) thought it meant he had set off a real atomic bomb. Nolan later remarked that it was both "flattering" and "scary" that his fans would think that of him. The production team was able to obtain government permission to film at White Sands Missile Range, but only at highly inconvenient hours, and therefore chose to film the scene elsewhere in the New Mexico desert. The production filmed the Trinity test scenes in Belen, New Mexico, with Murphy climbing a 100-foot steel tower, a replica of the original site used in the Manhattan Project, in rough weather. A special set was built in which gasoline, propane, aluminum powder, and magnesium were used to create the explosive effect. Although they used miniatures for the practical effect, the special effects supervisor, Scott R. Fisher, referred to them as "big-atures", since the special effects team had tried to build the models as physically large as possible. To make the models look closer to their intended real-life size, the team used forced perspective. Visualizations of the interactions between atoms, molecules and energy waves, as well as the depiction of stars, black holes and supernovas, were also achieved through practical methods. Nolan claimed the film contains no computer-generated effects, and used practical effects to achieve "real-world imagery".

The last portion of principal photography was for Nolan and van Hoytema to travel to Europe to obtain establishing shots for the early European phase of Oppenheimer's life. For example, they did not bother with shooting in any actual part of the University of Cambridge; "van Hoytema simply set up a camera across the river". Filming wrapped in May 2022.

=== Post-production ===
Editing was completed by Jennifer Lame, who had previously edited Tenet. While inspecting the footage during editing, Nolan and Lame performed "character passes" to ensure all the characters were properly displayed on screen, due to the film having a faster pace than most traditional blockbusters. Visual effects were handled by DNEG, which produced more than 100 VFX shots from more than 400 practically shot elements, marking their eighth collaboration with Nolan. Andrew Jackson was the visual effects supervisor, who stated that the film used mostly "invisible" visual effects through "'in-camera' special effects created on set". Digital compositing was used for the Trinity scene to add multi-layers to the explosion which was shot in a multifaceted viewpoint. There were 160 VFX artists who worked on the film, 134 of whom were left uncredited.

Steven Spielberg was the first person to see the final cut, in a private screening of its first 70mm print. Nolan said: "He said some very kind things, but really just to watch him watch ... I wasn't even supposed to watch it with him, but seeing the great master watching? It was sort of irresistible."

=== Music ===
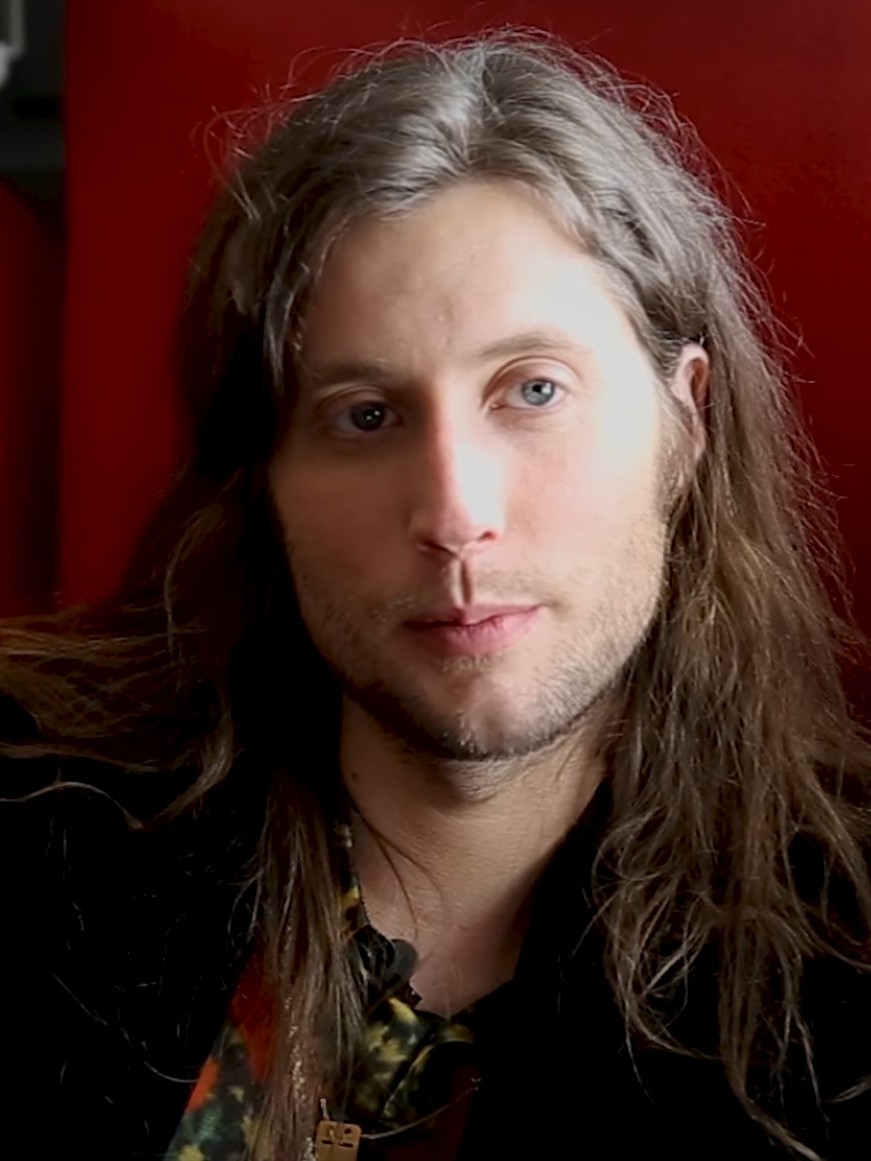
Ludwig Göransson won the Academy Award for Best Original Score.

Ludwig Göransson composed the score for the film, after doing so for Nolan's previous film, Tenet. Göransson's score was featured in a trailer for the film on May 8, 2023. It was also featured in the Universal Pictures exclusive five-minute Opening Look on July 13. Nolan had advised him to use a solo violin for Oppenheimer's central theme in the film, with Göransson remarking that he had felt that it could go from "the most romantic, beautiful tone in a split second to neurotic and heart wrenching, horror sounds".

The score "is integral to the film ... which contains almost wall-to-wall music". Göransson estimates that music is played for at least 2.5 hours of the film, which is more than 83% of its length.

== Release ==
=== Marketing ===
Oppenheimer's teaser trailer was released on July 28, 2022, featuring a live countdown to 5:29 a.m. (MDT) on July 16, 2023, the 78th anniversary of the first detonation of an atomic weapon; it premiered in screenings of Nope before being posted online on Universal's social media profiles. Empire commented that it is exemplary of Nolan's style: "heady, brooding stuff with a real sense of weight".

In December 2022, two trailers premiered in front of Avatar: The Way of Water, with one being exclusive to IMAX theaters and the other being shown in all other formats. The latter was eventually released online. In May 2023, an official main trailer debuted during preview screenings of Guardians of the Galaxy Vol. 3. It was subsequently released to the public on May 8, 2023, alongside a theatrical release poster.

=== Theatrical ===
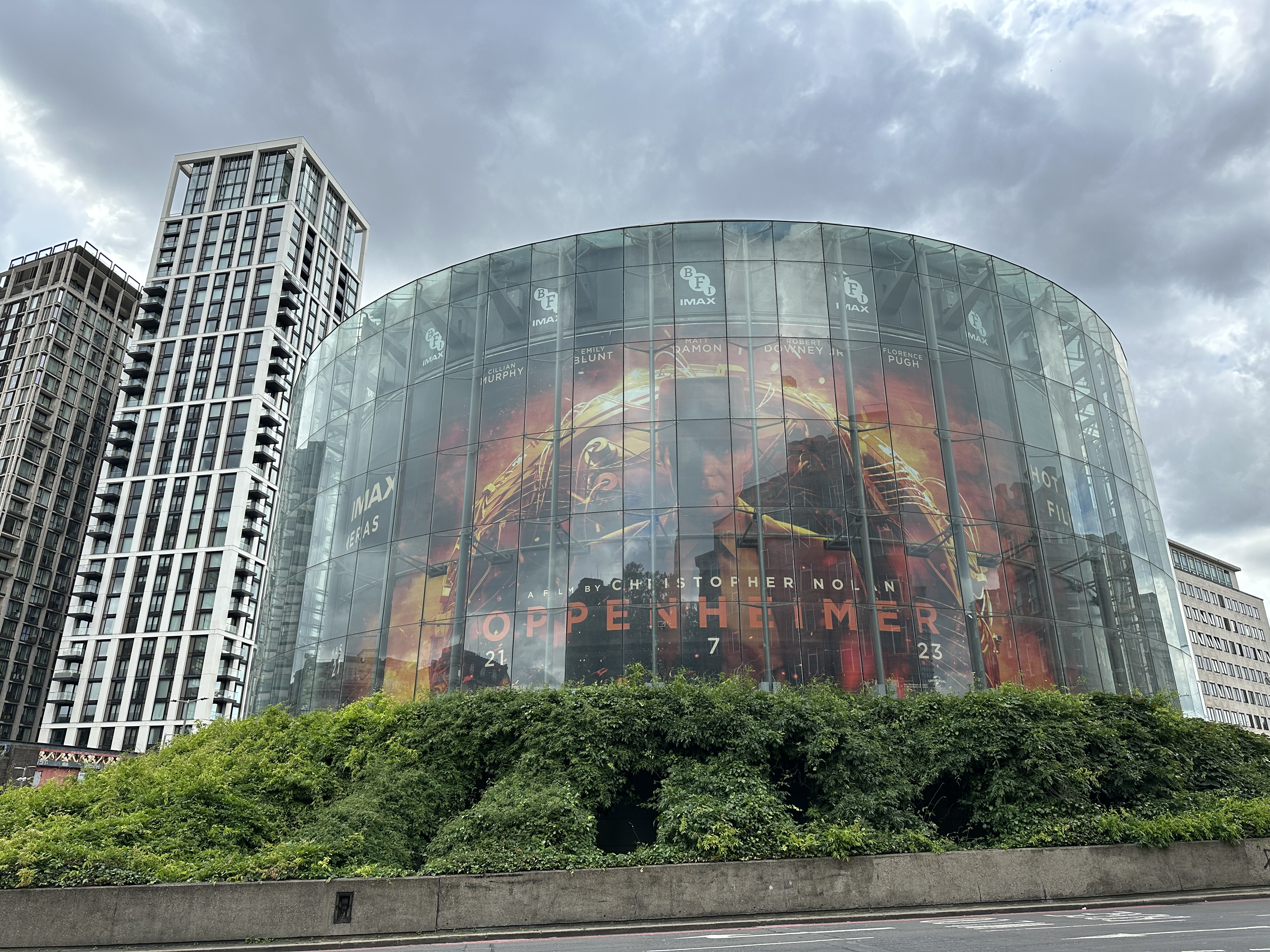
Screening of Oppenheimer at the BFI IMAX in London

Oppenheimer had its world premiere at Le Grand Rex in Paris on July 11, 2023, followed by the British premiere at Odeon Luxe Leicester Square in London on July 13, and the American premiere at AMC Lincoln Square 13 in New York City on July 17. Both the London and the New York premieres were affected by the SAG-AFTRA strike, as some actors left the London premiere early, and Universal Pictures canceled the red carpet event for the New York premiere. SAG-AFTRA President Fran Drescher later claimed the studios "duped" the guild into accepting a twelve-day-extension for negotiations to continue promoting summer films like Oppenheimer. Oppenheimer was released theatrically on July 21, 2023, by Universal Pictures. In addition to standard digital cinemas, it was also released in various film formats including IMAX 70 mm (30 prints), standard 70 mm (113 prints) and 35 mm (around 80 prints).

The film was released on the same day as Barbie, a fantasy comedy film directed by Greta Gerwig based on Mattel's Barbie fashion dolls and media franchise, and distributed by Warner Bros. Many speculated that the decision by Warner Bros. to release Barbie on the same day as Oppenheimer was made in order to deplete ticket sales of Oppenheimer as retaliation for Nolan releasing the film with Universal. Due to the tonal and genre dissonance between the two films, many social media users created memes about how the two films appealed to different audiences, and how they should be viewed as a double feature. The trend was dubbed "Barbenheimer", and was described as counterprogramming during a summer of "entertainment industry meltdown". Cillian Murphy had endorsed the phenomenon, saying "My advice would be for people to go see both, on the same day. If they are good films, then that's cinema's gain."

In March 2022, Universal Pictures halted the release of its titles in Russia, joining other major American film distributors in the boycott against the country following its invasion of Ukraine in February 2022. Oppenheimer had also been banned by Russia's Ministry of Culture, which had refused to license screenings of the film, stating that it did not meet their goals of "preserving and strengthening traditional Russian spiritual values".

The film was not released in Japan until eight months after its initial global release. Variety noted the controversial reputation in Japan due to the atomic bombings of Hiroshima and Nagasaki. A Universal spokesperson said that "plans have not been finalized in all markets". American films are often released in Japan a few months after the initial theatrical release. In December 2023, independent Japanese film distributor Bitters End announced that it would theatrically release the film in 2024, as Universal's distributor in Japan Toho-Towa opted against releasing it. The film was later released by Bitters End in Japan on March 29, and during its first three days, it was ranked as the country's highest grossing foreign film after making 379.3 million yen ($2.5 million) at the box office.

==== Classifications and censorship ====
In the United States, the film received an R-rating from the Motion Picture Association for "some sexuality, nudity, and language". It is Nolan's first film to receive that rating since Insomnia (2002). In Australia, the film received an MA 15+ rating from the Australian Classification Board board for "strong sex and a suicide scene". In the United Kingdom, the film received a 15 certificate from the British Board of Film Classification for "strong language and sex", meaning anyone under the age of 15 cannot be admitted to view the film. In some countries, including those in the Middle East, South Asia and Southeast Asia, Universal distributed a version of the film with Florence Pugh's nude body covered by a computer-generated black dress.

In India, Oppenheimer was released with all scenes depicting nudity, sex and cigarette smoking being censored, earning the U/A certificate from the Central Board of Film Certification (CBFC) while retaining the running time.

==== Bhagavad Gita controversy ====
The audio of the scene in which Tatlock directs Oppenheimer to read a verse from the Hindu scripture Bhagavad Gita, "I am become Death, destroyer of worlds", remained intact. As NDTV reported, the Minister for Information and Broadcasting Anurag Thakur questioned how the CBFC certified the film with the verse heard during such circumstance in the first place, and asked the scene to be deleted. Hindu nationalists were angered by the scene and demanded its removal. Among them was journalist Uday Mahurkar, who wrote an open letter to Nolan calling the scene a "direct assault on religious beliefs of a billion tolerant Hindus", and demanded its removal from all releases of Oppenheimer across the world. On the other hand, actor Nitish Bharadwaj told The Times of India that "The use of this verse in the film should also be understood from Oppenheimer's emotional state of mind. A scientist thinks of his creation 24x7x365 days, irrespective of what he is doing. His mind space is consumed fully of his creation & the physical act is just a natural mechanical act."

=== Home media ===
Oppenheimer was released on Ultra HD Blu-ray, regular Blu-ray and DVD formats including digital on November 21, 2023. As the former two releases sold out days after release, Universal worked on restocking before the holiday season. Nolan was vocal during the home release campaign of the film about the importance of physical media libraries, stating that letting films only exist digitally or on streaming services allows companies to have too much control and creates a danger for film preservation. The film was released for streaming in the United States exclusively on Peacock and in Canada on Amazon Prime Video on February 16, 2024. On July 12, 2025, Oppenheimer was released on Netflix in the UK & Ireland.

== Reception ==
=== Box office ===
Box office revenue			Box office ranking		Reference
United States and Canada	Other territories	Worldwide	All time U.S. and Canada	All time worldwide	Reference
$330,078,895	$653,069,157	$983,148,052	No. 98	No. 65	

Oppenheimer grossed $330.1 million in the United States and Canada and $653.1 million in other territories, for a worldwide total of $983.1 million; $190 million of which came from IMAX alone. It is the fourth-highest-grossing R-rated film of all time behind Joker (2019), Deadpool & Wolverine (2024), and Nolan's next film, The Odyssey (2026). In September 2023, Oppenheimer became the highest-grossing biographical film of all time, surpassing Bohemian Rhapsody (2018). It was overtaken by Michael (2026) three years later, making it the second-highest-grossing biographical film.

By August 2023, Oppenheimer had become the highest-grossing film ever to not reach the top spot at the domestic box office, although in its sixth weekend it topped the worldwide box office with a total of $38.12 million, surpassing Barbie for the first time. It is also the highest grossing World War II-related film, surpassing Dunkirk (2017), also a Nolan film. Additionally, Oppenheimer became one of the top five highest-grossing IMAX releases, earning $183 million (approximately 20% of its total gross), over $17 million of which was earned from the 30 screens showing IMAX 70 mm prints. The film was booked to be rereleased in IMAX theaters on November 3, including six IMAX 70 mm prints, as these theaters reported selling out during the initial release. Deadline Hollywood calculated the net profit of the film to be $201.9 million, when factoring together all expenses and revenues.

==== United States and Canada ====
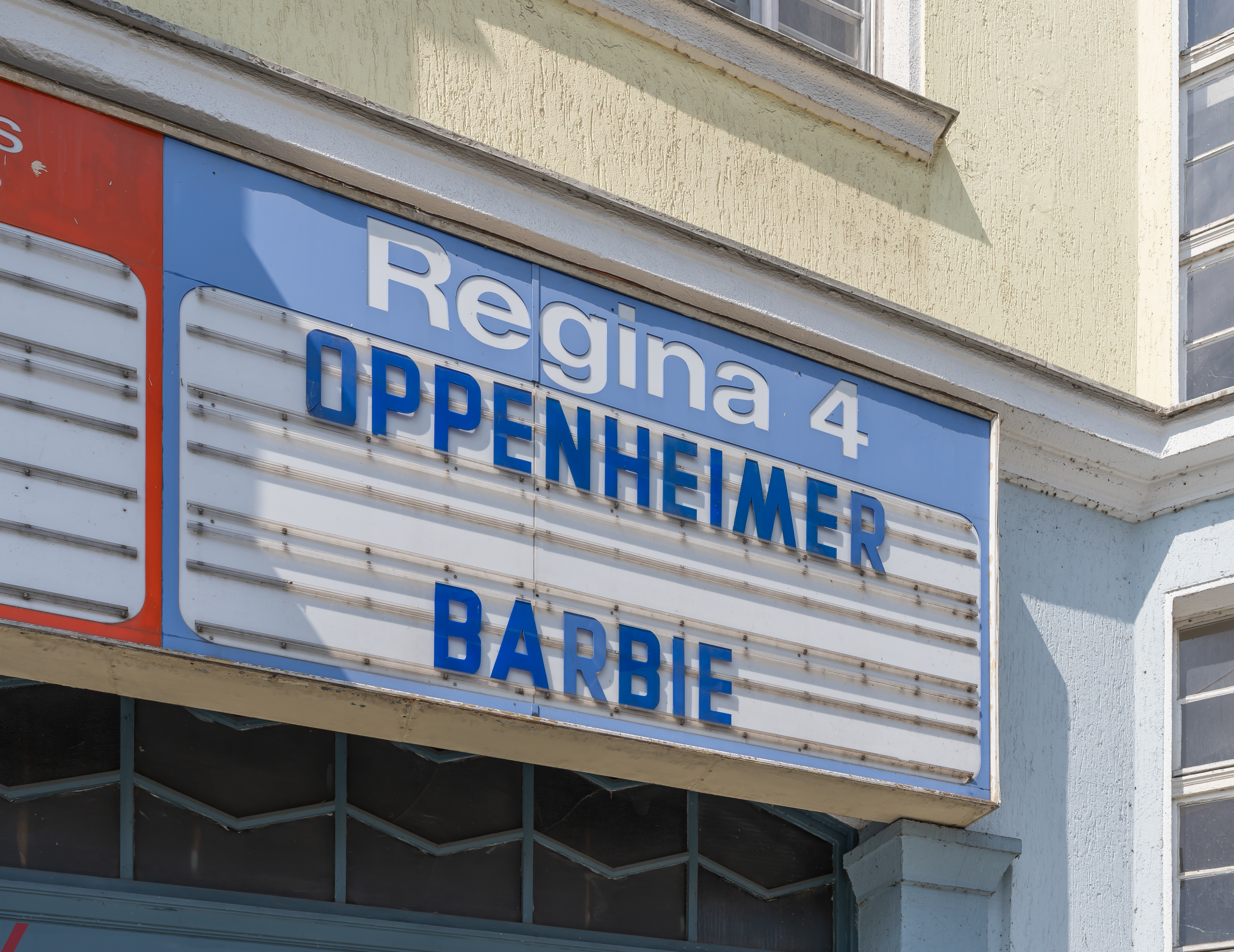
A theater showing Oppenheimer alongside Barbie

In the United States and Canada, Oppenheimer was released alongside Barbie, in what became known as 'Barbenheimer'. The week of their releases, AMC Theatres announced that over 40,000 AMC Stubs members had already pre-booked tickets to both films on the same day. After grossing $33 million on its first day (including $10.5 million from Thursday night previews), it went on to debut to $82.5 million, finishing second behind Barbie and marking one of the best opening weekends ever for an R-rated drama, as well as the highest opening weekend for a 2023 R-rated film, beating John Wick: Chapter 4. 64% of the audience was male, with 33% being 18–34 years old. The Barbenheimer phenomenon was credited with boosting interest in the film, with a total of 79% of tickets sold over the weekend being for the two films (27% for Oppenheimer), a combined total of 18.5 million people. Oppenheimer's opening weekend was Nolan's best for an original film, being the highest of his filmography outside of the latter two films from The Dark Knight trilogy. It also achieved the third-highest opening weekend for a biopic film, behind The Passion of the Christ (2004) and American Sniper (2014).

Oppenheimer made $46.2 million in its second weekend (a drop of 44%), remaining in second behind Barbie. The film made $28.7 million in its third weekend, finishing third behind Barbie and newcomer Meg 2: The Trench. On August 16, Oppenheimer surpassed Sing (2016) to become the highest-grossing film to never reach the number one spot at the box office. During its fourth weekend, the film made $18.8 million (a drop of 35%) rising back up to second place. In its fifth and sixth weekends, the film grossed $10.7 million and $9 million (a drop of 43% and 16% respectively), finishing in third and fourth place at the box office and passing $300 million domestically in its sixth weekend. Following its 13 Oscar nominations, the film expanded from 1,008 theaters to 2,262 in its 28th week of release and made $1 million, an increase of 284% from the previous weekend.

==== Japan ====
In Japan, Oppenheimer was released on March 29, 2024. Prior to its release, it attracted controversy there, and Warner Bros. issued an apology following criticism of the Barbenheimer phenomenon as insensitive. Despite the outcry, the film would do very well in Japan, grossing $2.5 million and placing third in the country's box office during its opening weekend.

The film received a range of comments from the Japanese public. Some theaters displayed content warnings for the film. A number of people from Hiroshima who viewed the film reported feeling discomfort and distress while watching it. One point of contention was on the choice to not visually depict the nuclear bombing of Japan. A number of Japanese people praised the choice and others felt that it resulted in the downplaying or glorification of the bombing. Takashi Hiraoka, former mayor of Hiroshima, reportedly felt that the horror of nuclear weapons had not been sufficiently portrayed in the film. A number of people reported feeling that Oppenheimer was glorified in the film for his role in developing the bomb, and a number of people felt that he was also a victim of his circumstances and experienced distress from it. Masao Tomonaga, who experienced one of the nuclear bombings, felt that the film was "anti-nuclear" and expressed disappointment in the lack of a scene for the atomic bombing in Japan, but was reportedly satisfied with the portrayal of Oppenheimer's distress after the bombings. A Hiroshima resident was reported advocating for more people to see the film, and another advocated for fewer.

When commenting on Oppenheimer's success in the country, USC School of Cinematic Arts' Vice Dean of Faculty, Akira Mizuta Lippit, stated in an article for Deadline Hollywood in May 2024, "Previous films about Japan, good and bad, some offensive or ignorant, have nonetheless enjoyed box office success in Japan," noting how films like Pearl Harbor and The Last Samurai were "embraced by Japanese audiences," whereas other films like Memoirs of a Geisha were "a little less so."

==== Other territories ====
Outside the United States and Canada, Oppenheimer grossed $98 million in its opening weekend. The following weekend, it earned $77.1 million, dropping by 21% to become Nolan's highest-grossing film in 30 countries, including India, Saudi Arabia, United Arab Emirates and Turkey. In its third weekend, Oppenheimer grossed $52.8 million (a drop of 31%) and $32 million in its fourth weekend. It held well in the following weeks, making $32 million and $29.1 million in its fifth and sixth weekends. As of September 10, 2023, the highest-grossing territories were the UK ($75 million), China ($61.6 million), Germany ($51.9 million), France ($43.1 million) and Australia ($25.9 million).

=== Critical response ===
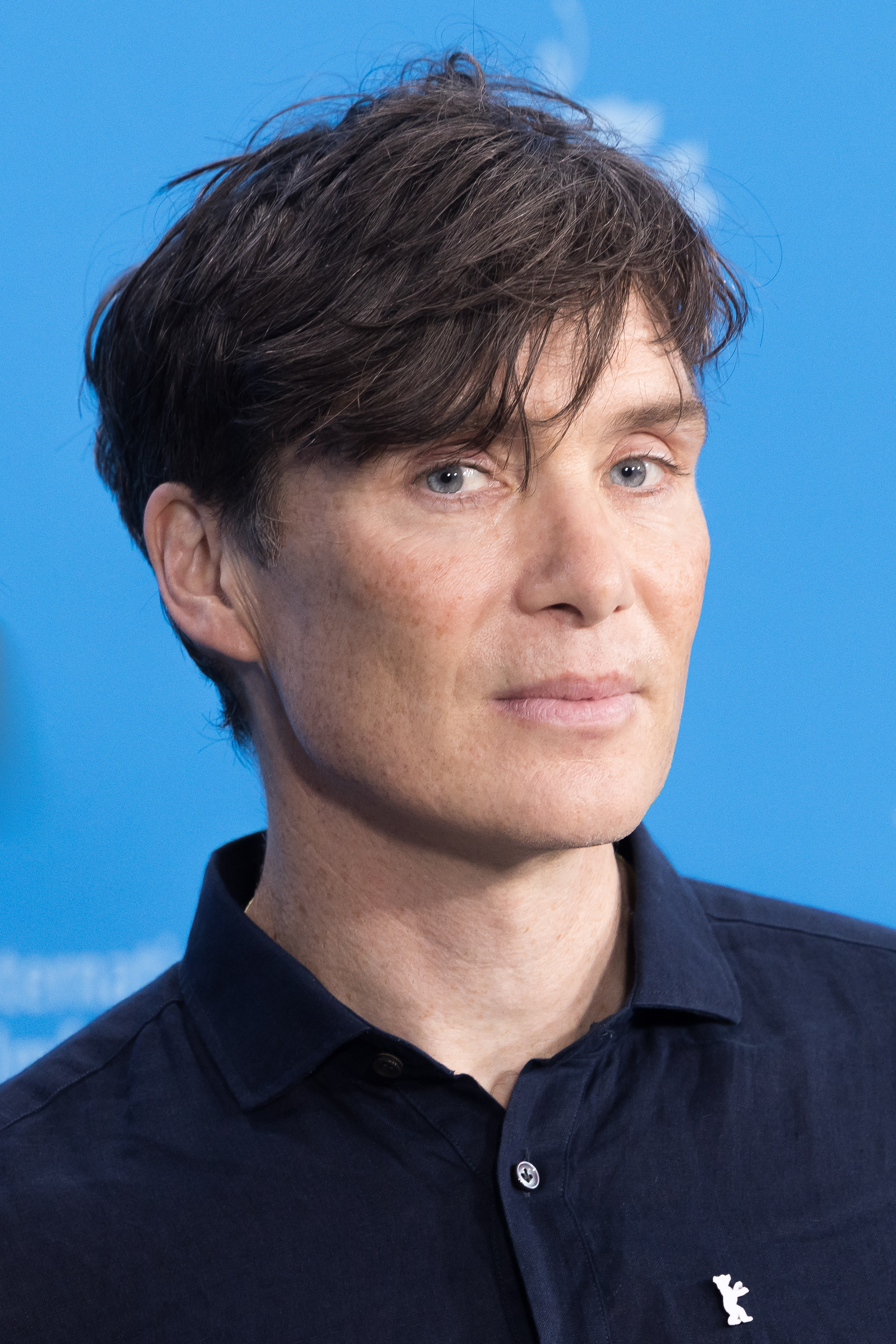
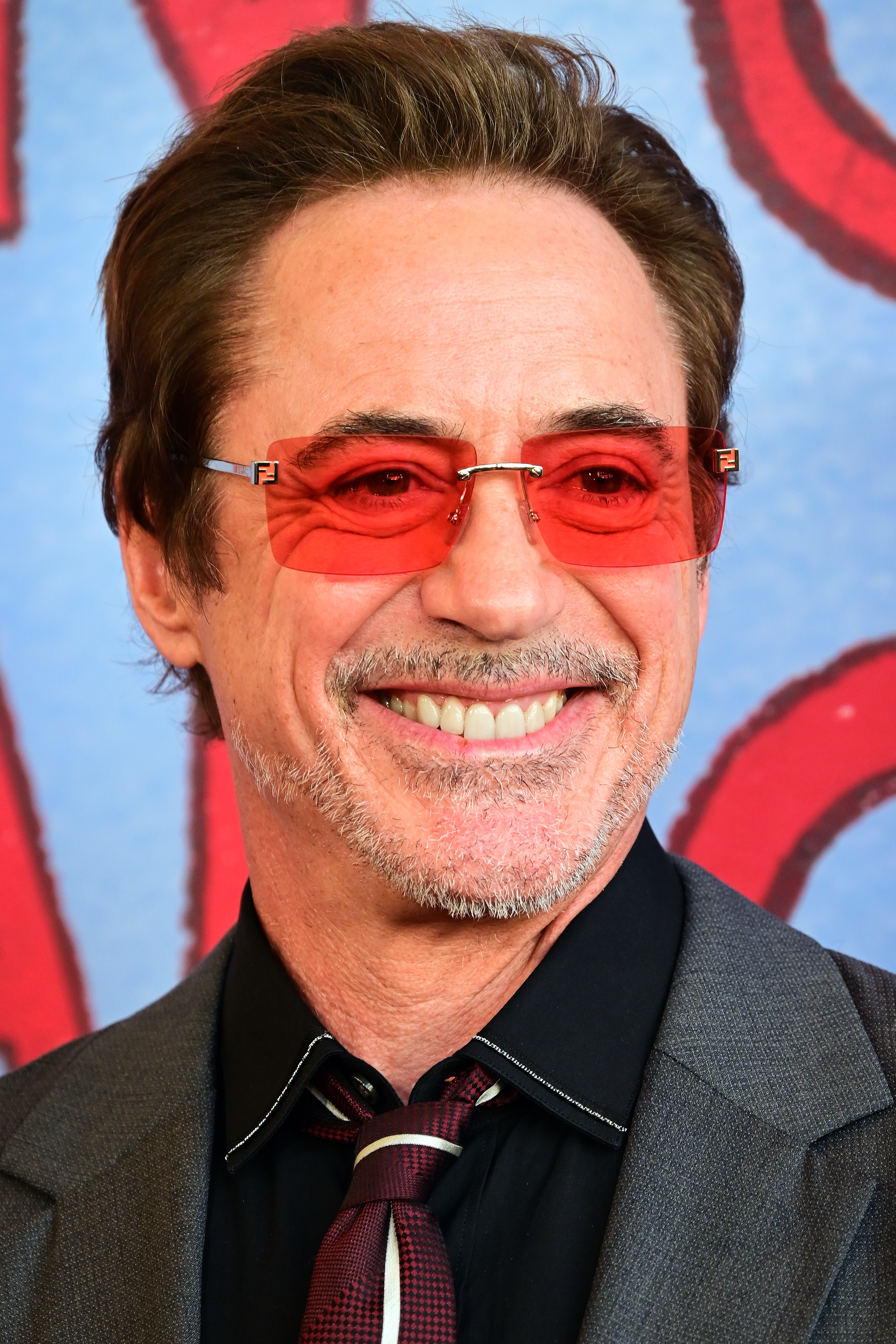
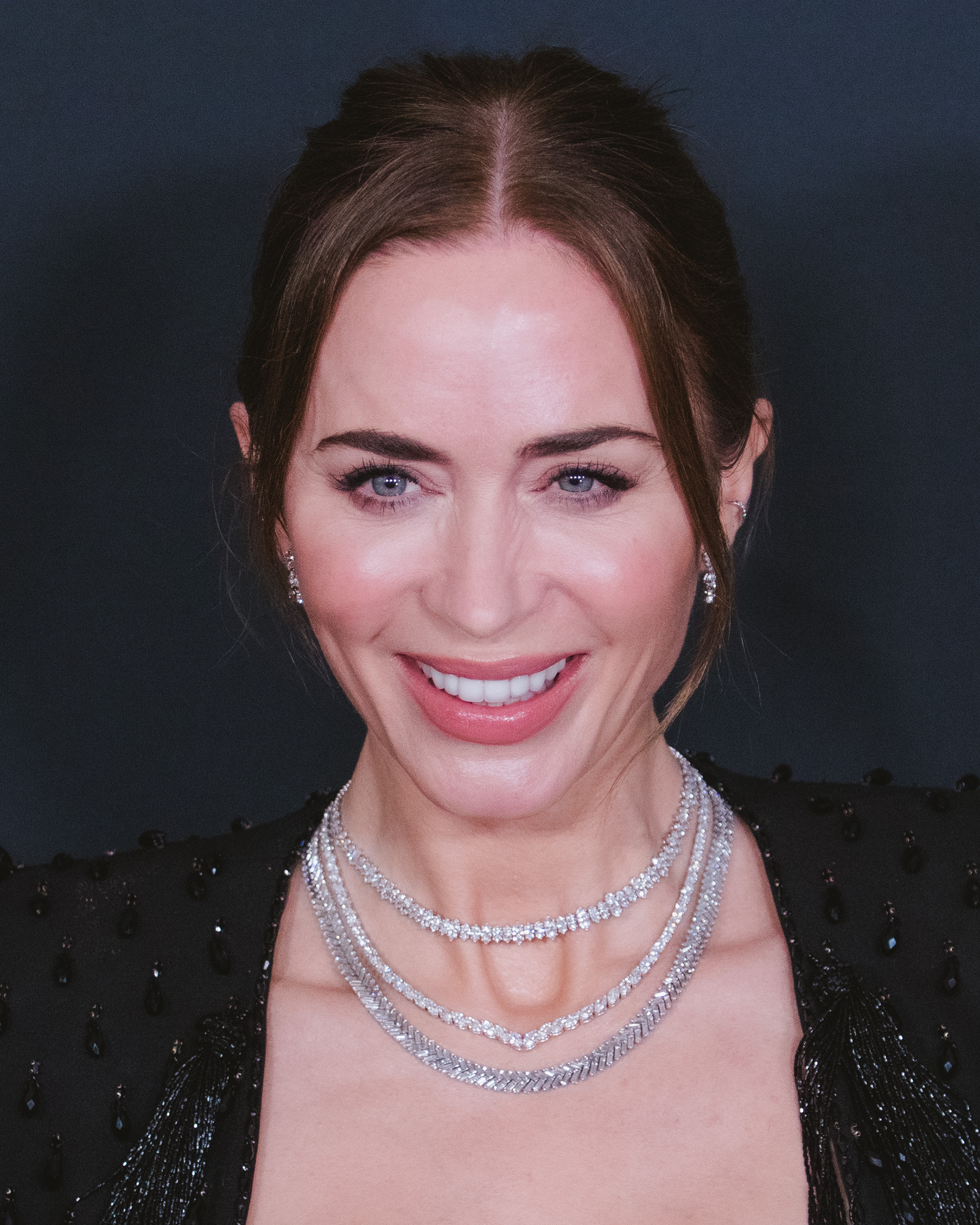
Cillian Murphy, Robert Downey Jr., and Emily Blunt garnered critical acclaim for their performances and earned Academy Award nominations for Best Actor, and Best Supporting Actor and Actress, with Murphy and Downey Jr. winning.

Oppenheimer received critical acclaim. (Note: Attributed to multiple references:) Critics praised the film primarily for its screenplay, cast performances, and visuals. (Note: Attributed to multiple references:) It was frequently ranked as one of Nolan's best films, (Note: Hindustan Times reported that the film was also hailed as one of the best films of the 21st century) and one of the best of 2023. On review aggregation website Rotten Tomatoes, 93% of 509 critics' reviews are positive, with an average rating of 8.6/10. The website's consensus reads, "Oppenheimer marks another engrossing achievement from Christopher Nolan that benefits from Murphy's tour-de-force performance and stunning visuals." Metacritic, which uses a weighted average, assigned the film a score of 90 out of 100, based on 69 critics, indicating "universal acclaim". Audiences polled by CinemaScore gave the film an average grade of "A" on an A+ to F scale, while those polled by PostTrak gave it a 93% overall positive score, with 74% saying they would definitely recommend the film.

Richard Roeper of the Chicago Sun-Times gave Oppenheimer a perfect four out of four, describing it as "magnificent" and "one of the best films of the 21st century". The A.V. Club's Matthew Jackson deemed it a "masterpiece", adding that "it's Christopher Nolan's best film so far, a step up to a new level for one of our finest filmmakers and a movie that burns itself into your brain". Empire's Dan Jolin labeled it a "masterfully constructed character study", taking particular note of Murphy's performance and van Hoytema's IMAX cinematography. Peter Suderman, writing for Reason, said that the film leaves the viewer with a sense of "fear and foreboding about the horror of full-on nuclear conflict in the wake of the nuclear bomb. Humanity is both great and terrible. Oppenheimer isn't just a movie—it's a warning."

Matt Zoller Seitz, writing for RogerEbert.com, awarded Oppenheimer a full four out of four rating. He lauded Nolan's storytelling, exploration of Oppenheimer's character and its technical achievements, concluding: "As a physical experience, Oppenheimer is something else entirely—it's hard to say exactly what and that's what's so fascinating about it". He also compared the role of the conversation between Oppenheimer and Einstein in the film to the role of "Rosebud" in Citizen Kane. Peter Travers described the film as a "monumental achievement" and "one of the best films you'll see anywhere". Caryn James of BBC similarly termed it "boldly imaginative and [Nolan's] most mature work yet", adding that it combined the "explosive, commercially-enticing action of The Dark Knight trilogy" with the "cerebral underpinnings" of Memento, Inception and Tenet. IGN critic Siddhant Adlakha ranked Oppenheimer 10/10, describing it as "a three-hour biopic that plays like a jolting thriller" and Nolan's most "abstract" work yet.

Despite praising the film's themes and performances, CNN's Brian Lowry believed that "Nolan juggles a lot, in a way that somewhat works to the movie's detriment". Owen Gleiberman of Variety found the film's first half "mesmerizing" and "tick[ing] with cosmic suspense", but wrote that "a certain humming intensity leaks out of the movie" after the Trinity Test sequence, which was itself described as a "letdown". Manohla Dargis of The New York Times called the film "a brilliant achievement in formal and conceptual terms", praising Nolan for capturing "the kinetic excitement of intellectual discourse" and comparing the film's complex narrative structure to a "Cubistic portrait". However, she found some of the cameos by supporting actors such as Malek "distracting", and noted that the film's black-and-white scenes could feel "overlong" despite ultimately working in service of Nolan's narrative intentions. In a mixed review, Odie Henderson of The Boston Globe called the film "visually stunning but emotionally empty", criticizing Nolan's screenplay for rendering Oppenheimer an "enigma whose inner life is expressed by gimmicky cuts to scenes of outer space rather than evidence of human emotions." Furthermore, Henderson negatively characterized the film's second half as "an interminable series of scenes set in courtrooms and at congressional hearings", and felt Pugh and Blunt were "wasted" in "severely underwritten" roles. Richard Brody of The New Yorker described the film as a "History Channel movie with fancy editing" and wrote, "I was tempted to call it a movie-length Wikipedia article. But after a look online, I realized I was giving Wikipedia too little credit—or Christopher Nolan, the movie's writer and director, too much".

While praising how the film acknowledges the contribution of "American scientists and American enterprise", Brett Mason complained that it omits the crucial contributions of non-Americans who ensured the work was able to commence as early as December 1941: "Nolan completely ignores the crucial role that British science and Australian physicist Mark Oliphant played in jump-starting the quest." Writing for the Los Angeles Times, Justin Chang defended Nolan's accurate depiction of how Oppenheimer could not see the true victims of his work. Chang wrote that instead of satisfying "representational completists" by detouring to Hiroshima and Nagasaki, "Nolan treats them instead as a profound absence, an indictment by silence". Chang later won the 2024 Pulitzer Prize for Criticism for that article.

For IndieWire's annual critics poll, in which 158 critics and journalists from around the world voted, Oppenheimer was placed second in their Best Film list, with 69 overall mentions and 17 first-place votes. Nolan was also ranked second on the Best Director list, while his screenplay was placed eighth. Murphy was the highest-placed actor on the Best Performance list (fourth overall) while Van Hoytema's work topped the Best Cinematography list. Oppenheimer also appeared in over 410 critics' lists of the best films released in 2023, and was ranked first in 99 of them.

The film garnered significant praise from prominent filmmakers. Oliver Stone deemed the film "a classic, which I never believed could be made in this climate". Paul Schrader called Oppenheimer, "the best, most important film of this century", while Denis Villeneuve called it "a masterpiece". Steven Soderbergh said of the film, "Oppenheimer is a real accomplishment. I read somewhere that Chris [Nolan] implied that this is the movie he's been building toward, and I think he's right. And I'm thrilled that it's a massive hit." Spike Lee also praised the film, calling it a "great film", but felt that it should have shown what happened to the Japanese people, given the film's length. Japanese director Takashi Yamazaki said, "As a person of Japanese ancestry and descent, my response to Oppenheimer [is that] I would like to dedicate a different film to that when that day comes." Other filmmakers, including A. V. Rockwell, Joe Dante, Reinaldo Marcus Green, Chad Hartigan, Don Hertzfeldt, Matt Johnson, Raine Allen-Miller, James Ponsoldt and Adam Wingard cited it as among their favorite films of 2023. Conversely, James Cameron was critical of the film stating "it was a bit of a moral cop out because it's not like Oppenheimer didn't know the effects. He's got one brief scene in the film where we see — and I don't like to criticize another filmmaker's film – but there's only one brief moment where he sees some charred bodies in the audience and then the film goes on to show how it deeply moved him. But I felt that it dodged the subject."

Korean film critic Yim Jeong-sik said "Oppenheimer depicts the tragedy of the combination of science and politics. Oppenheimer developed the atomic bomb to stop the Nazis from developing nuclear weapons, but the result was the bomb dropped on Japan and countless casualties. The film coldly shows how science loses its purity and becomes a tool of the state through the process of Oppenheimer's choice combining with America's imperial ambitions."

In August 2023, Oppenheimer ranked number three on Collider's list of "The 20 Best Drama Movies of the 2020s So Far", with the site writing that Nolan "explores the world's obsession with destructive nuclear weapons from the perspective of their creator; using the Greek myth of Dante [sic] as an inspiration, Oppenheimer makes it clear that once this type of power is unleashed, it is bound to be used again." In June 2025, IndieWire ranked the film at number 54 on its list of "The 100 Best Movies of the 2020s (So Far)", while The New York Times ranked it at number 65 on its list of "The 100 Best Movies of the 21st Century" . In July 2025, it ranked number 86 on Rolling Stone's list of "The 100 Best Movies of the 21st Century".

=== Influence on legislation ===
The renewed attention to the Trinity site and associated nuclear testing encouraged the United States Congress to revise the Radiation Exposure Compensation Act (1990), which provided compensation programs for people affected by radiation and nuclear testing during the Cold War, known as "Downwinders" and primarily consisting of the Navajo Nation. The United States Senate approved amendments to accommodate additional services to people in New Mexico, but it has not passed through Congress as the House of Representatives had not yet debated its inclusion as part of the national defense bill for the 2024 fiscal year.

As of March 2025, there have been continuous efforts to revive and expand the RECA. New Mexico lawmakers expressed, in a non-binding resolution (House Memorial 15), their support for federal legislation to expand compensation for individuals affected by radiation exposure, particularly those involved with uranium mining and Downwinders who were affected by the Trinity test and other related nuclear activities.

== Historical accuracy ==
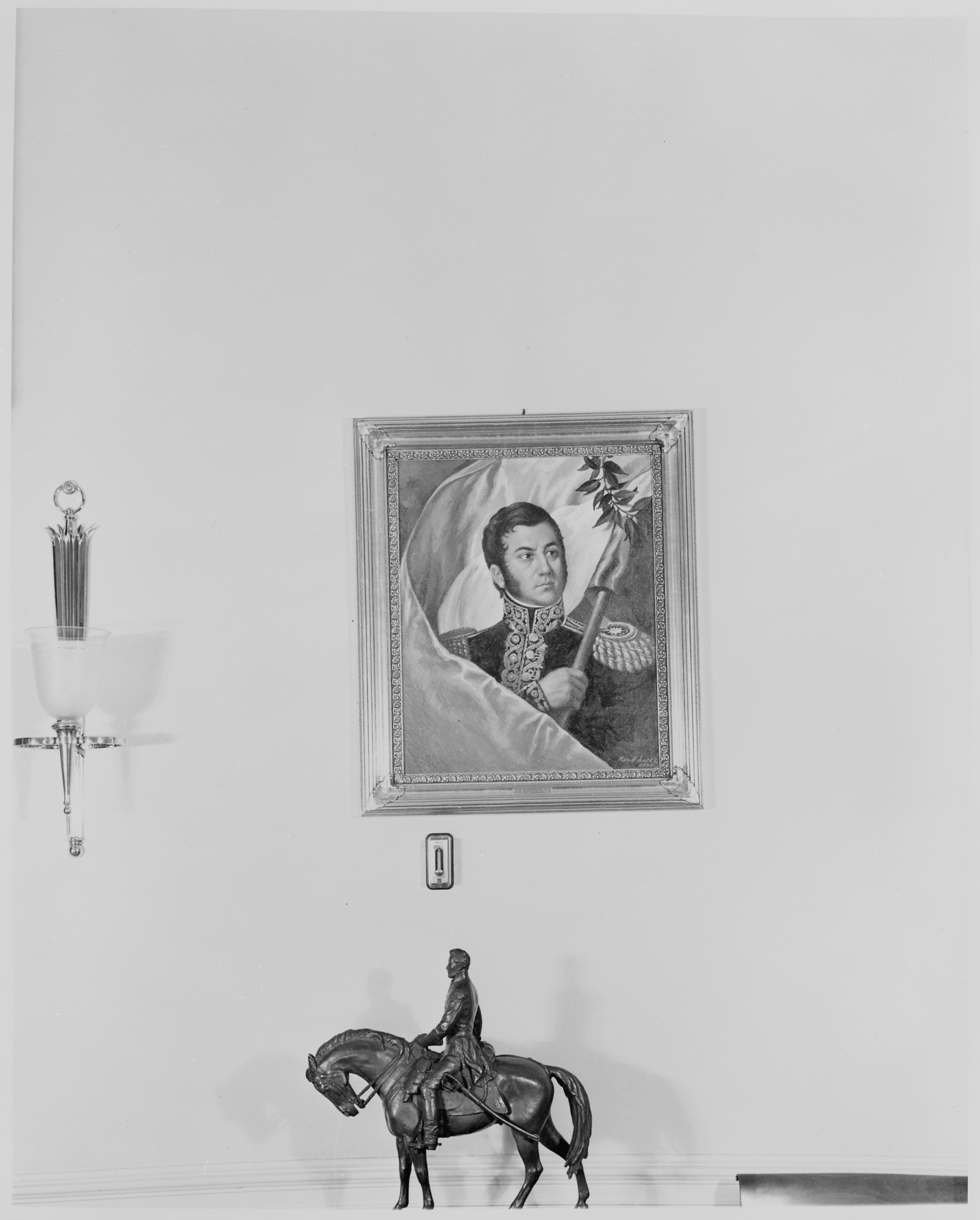
President Truman's portrait of the Argentine leader José de San Martín did not arrive at the White House until 1946, more than a year after his meeting with Oppenheimer.

Some scenes in the movie were taken word-for-word out of the book or real life events. Many of the changes are small embellishments or changes from real life. For example, Oppenheimer was not as excited about his discovery of black holes as shown in the film since he did not know how significant it would become. The study was indeed released on the same day Germany invaded Poland, as shown in the film. During the Trinity test, Donald Hornig had his hand on the kill switch for a faster reaction time and not near it as depicted in the film. Truman did call Oppenheimer a "crybaby" but in a letter to Dean Acheson one year later, not immediately after meeting Oppenheimer.

The incorrect American flag for the time period was used in the film. In some shots, the current 50-star flag is shown, which was not adopted until 1960. During the war, the American flag had only 48 stars as Hawaii and Alaska had yet to become states.

The scene where Oppenheimer poisons his tutor's apple at university is based on accounts that Oppenheimer gave of the incident, but it is unclear whether it occurred in real life. Oppenheimer is depicted as putting potassium cyanide in the apple before having a change of heart the next day and narrowly preventing it from being eaten. There is no evidence that Niels Bohr nearly ate the apple or had any involvement in the incident.

John von Neumann is entirely absent from the film, yet was one of the most important scientists involved in the Manhattan Project. He was instrumental in developing the implosion method used in the plutonium bomb. Despite his disagreement with Oppenheimer over the hydrogen bomb programme, von Neumann testified on Oppenheimer’s behalf at the 1954 security hearing.

Oppenheimer and Einstein were friends, but the specific conversations which the film revolves around never happened. Oppenheimer took his concerns about an unstoppable chain reaction to physicist Arthur Compton at MIT, not Einstein. Although the film portrays Groves' aggressive recruitment of Oppenheimer, Arthur Compton at the Metallurgical Laboratory had earlier recruited and appointed Oppenheimer to take over the research into the bomb-design part of what became the Manhattan Project.

As Strauss correctly points out in the film's dialogue, Oppenheimer never expressed regret for the atomic bombings, but as Chang explained in his Pulitzer Prize-winning article, the true situation not depicted in the film was that Oppenheimer avoided giving an apology when confronted by a reporter during his 1960 visit to Tokyo and Osaka. In addition to their interpersonal conflicts, Strauss had another reason to undermine Oppenheimer's credibility by revoking his security clearance: Oppenheimer was opposed to further development of the hydrogen bomb by the United States. Scott Sagan describes the loss of Oppenheimer's influence as a possible constraint upon the nuclear arms race between the United States and USSR as a "broader tragedy" less clearly depicted in the film than the scientist's personal tragedy, but he called the production "highly accurate" otherwise for a Hollywood film.

Many efforts undertaken at other Manhattan Project sites like Hanford, Washington and Oak Ridge, Tennessee were not shown. Most of them, overseen by General Leslie Groves, focused on understanding and producing the radioactive material that powered the nuclear explosions. In addition to the team at Los Alamos, those working at other Project sites, particularly the University of Chicago's Metallurgical Laboratory, also expressed concerns about using the atomic bomb against Japan. The film was criticized for its omission of the 30 Native American families who were forcibly displaced from Los Alamos in 1942 to make space for the experiment.

In the film, a scene depicts the May 31, 1945, meeting of the Interim Committee, which J. Robert Oppenheimer attended as a member of the Scientific Panel of consultants. In this scene, Secretary of War Henry L. Stimson is portrayed ordering the removal of Kyoto from the list of top atomic bomb targets, allegedly because it was a favored honeymoon destination for him and his wife. However General Groves pointed out in his 1962 autobiography that Stimson vetoed it to Groves personally (not in a committee meeting) because he had visited Kyoto when he was Governor-general of the Philippines. Kyoto had impressed him with its ancient culture; it was of great historical and religious significance, and was the ancient capital of Japan. Historian of science and nuclear weapons Alex Wellerstein confirmed that the portrayal is a myth. According to Wellerstein, Stimson's diary from his 1926 travels with his wife does not mention Kyoto, and the only brief visit they made there was in 1929, during a single night stay while on a "fact-finding" mission related to his role as Governor-General of the Philippines. The film's depiction overlooks that Stimson's objection to targeting Kyoto was primarily strategic rather than personal. He expressed this viewpoint to President Truman on multiple occasions, including at the Potsdam Conference. Stimson wrote in his diary on July 24, 1945, "He (Truman) again reiterated with the utmost emphasis his own concurring belief on that subject, and he was particularly emphatic in agreeing with my suggestion that if elimination was not done, the bitterness which would be caused by such a wanton act might make it impossible during the long post-war period to reconcile the Japanese to us in that area rather than to the Russians." In Nolan's published screenplay for the film, Stimson only cites Kyoto's cultural significance for its removal from the bombing list; the line about Stimson honeymooning there was improvised on set by actor James Remar, based on his own research as he was preparing to play Stimson.

== Accolades ==
Oppenheimer earned a leading 13 nominations at the 96th Academy Awards, becoming Nolan's most Oscar-nominated film. At the ceremony, the film won Best Picture, Best Director, Best Actor for Murphy, Best Supporting Actor for Downey Jr., Best Cinematography, Best Film Editing, and Best Original Score. Besides composer Göransson, all recipients were first-time Oscar winners, including Nolan, Thomas, Roven, Downey Jr. and van Hoytema, who had each earned previous Academy Award nominations. Murphy became the first Irish-born performer to win the Academy Award for Best Actor. Oppenheimer became both the highest-grossing and longest Best Picture winning film since 2003's The Lord of the Rings: The Return of the King. The film was also nominated for Best Supporting Actress for Blunt, Best Adapted Screenplay, Best Costume Design, Best Makeup and Hairstyling, Best Production Design, and Best Sound.

The film won numerous other accolades. It won a leading five Golden Globe Awards, receiving Best Motion Picture – Drama, Best Director for Nolan, Best Actor in a Motion Picture – Drama for Murphy, Best Supporting Actor – Motion Picture for Downey Jr., and Best Original Score for Göransson at the 81st ceremony. The National Board of Review and the American Film Institute named Oppenheimer one of the top-ten films of 2023. Oppenheimer received nominations for 13 Critics' Choice Movie Awards (winning eight), 13 British Academy Film Awards (winning seven), 14 Saturn Awards (winning four), and four Screen Actors Guild Awards (winning three), while its score earned three nominations at the 66th Annual Grammy Awards (winning one).

== See also ==
- List of films about nuclear issues
- List of World War II films since 1990
- Oppenheimer, a 1980 TV series about Oppenheimer, starring Sam Waterston in the title role
- Fat Man and Little Boy, 1989 film about the Manhattan Project, starring Paul Newman as General Groves and Dwight Schultz as Oppenheimer
- Day One, 1989 TV film about the Manhattan Project, starring Brian Dennehy as General Groves and David Strathairn as Oppenheimer
- Doctor Atomic, a 2005 opera about Oppenheimer, composed by John Adams
- Nuclear Secrets, 2007 TV mini-series with two episodes dedicated to the Manhattan Project
- Manhattan, 2014-15 television series set at the Manhattan Project

== Sources ==
- Groves, Leslie (1962). Now It Can Be Told: The Story of the Manhattan Project. New York: Harper. OCLC 537684.
- Groves, Leslie R. (1983) [1962]. Now it can be Told: The Story of the Manhattan Project. Boston; Massachusetts: Da Capo Press; Perseus Group. ISBN 0-306-80189-2. paperback reprint, with December 1982 introduction by Edward Teller
