= Bibliography of Narendra Modi =

This bibliography of Narendra Modi article contains the list of written and published works, by or about Narendra Modi, who is serving the Prime Minister of India since 2014.

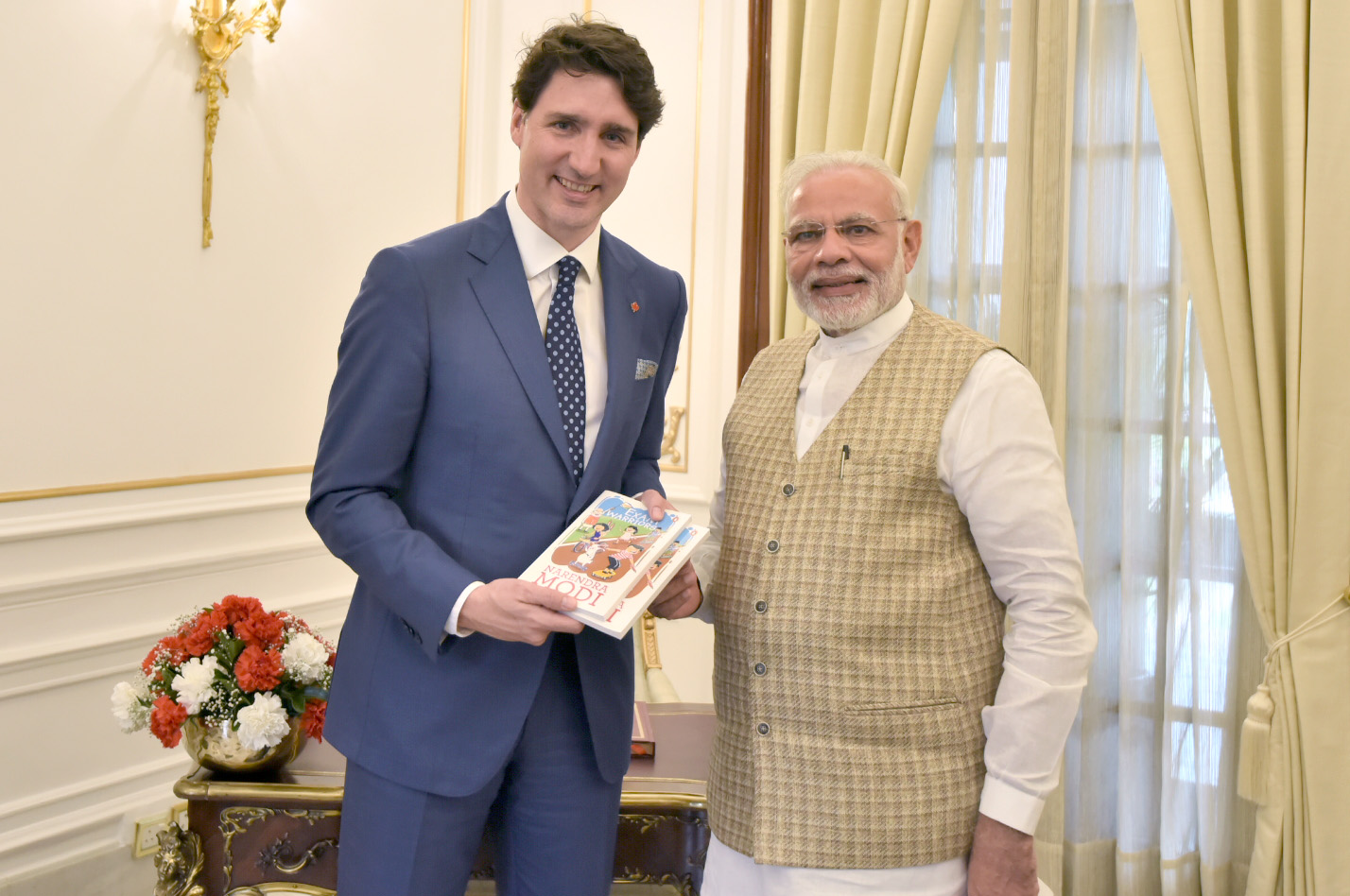
Prime Minister Narendra Modi presents his book Exam Warriors to the Prime Minister of Canada, Justin Trudeau in February 2018.

== Books by Narendra Modi ==
- Modi, Narendra (2004). Aapatkal Me Gujarat (in Hindi) (Samskaran 1 ed.). New Delhi: Prabhat Prakashan. ISBN 81-7315-466-X. OCLC 5636764.
- ——————— (2011). Convenient Action: Gujarat's Response to Challenges of Climate change. New Delhi: Macmillan Publishers India. ISBN 978-0-230-33192-1. OCLC 696558495.
- ——————— (2014). Social Harmony. Prabhat Prakashan. ISBN 978-93-5048-980-2.
- ——————— (22 April 2015). A Journey: Poems by Narendra Modi. Translated by Manthi, Rajiv. Rupa Publications. ISBN 978-81-291-3386-1.
- ——————— (21 December 2015). India's Singapore Story. ISEAS – Yusof Ishak Institute. ISBN 978-981-4695-73-2.
- ——————— (2015). Jyotipunj (in Hindi). Prabhat Prakashan. ISBN 978-93-5186-231-4.
- ——————— (2017). Mann Ki Baat: A Social Revolution on Radio. BlueKraft Digital Foundation. ISBN 978-935-035-990-7.
- ——————— (2018) [2017]. President Pranab Mukherjee: A Statesman. Translated by Joshi, Varun. The Statesman. ISBN 978-8192925554.
- ——————— (3 February 2018). Exam Warriors. Penguin India. ISBN 978-0143441502.
- ——————— (2018). Abode of Love [Premtirth]. Rajpal Publishers. ISBN 978-9350642382.
- ——————— (2020). Letters to Mother [Sakshi Bhaav]. HarperCollins. ISBN 978-9353576325.
- ——————— (2024). Ankh Ye Dhanya Hai [Ankh Aa Dhanya Chhe] (in Punjabi). Translated by Dhawan, Neha. Swaraj Prakashan. ISBN 978-9395695855.

== Books on Narendra Modi ==
- Balu, R. (30 June 2024). Power Within: The Leadership Legacy of Narendra Modi. Penguin India. p. 376. ISBN 9780143469278.
- Chinoy, Sujan R. (1 February 2023). Modi: Shaping a Global Order in Flux. Wisdom Tree. p. 372. ISBN 9788183285964.
- Elst, Koenraad (2015). On Modi Time: Merits and Flaws of Hindu Activism in Its Day of Incumbency. Voice of India. ISBN 9789385485008.
- Jaffrelot, Christophe (2021). Modi's India: Hindu Nationalism and the Rise of Ethnic Democracy. Translated by Cynthia Schoch (illustrated ed.). Princeton University Press. ISBN 978-0691223094.
- ———————— (2024). Gujarat Under Modi: Laboratory of Today's India. Oxford University Press. ISBN 978-0197787502.
- Kumar, Satish; Biswas, Bibhuti Bhusan (2016). Modi's Cultural Diplomacy and Soft Power: Issues and Challenges. Ansh Book International. ISBN 978-81-929327-4-3.
- Mahurkar, Uday (2 May 2014). Centrestage: Inside the Narendra Modi Model of Governance. Random House India. ISBN 978-81-8400-612-4.
- Makwana, Kishore (2014). Commonman Narendra Modi. Prabhat Prakashan. ISBN 978-93-5048-611-5.
- ———————— (2015). Modi: Common Man's PM. Prabhat Prakashan. ISBN 978-93-5048-978-9.
- Marino, Andy (6 April 2014). Narendra Modi: The Political Biography. HarperCollins. ISBN 978-93-5136-218-0.
- Mukhopadhyay, Nilanjan (2013). Narendra Modi: The Man, The Times. Westland. ISBN 978-93-82618-47-8.
- Nanda, Prakash (1 September 2016). Prime Minister Modi: Challenges Ahead. Heritage Publishers. ISBN 978-8170263647.
- Pankaj, Kumar (1901). Mahanayak Narendra Modi (in Hindi). Diamond Pocket Books. ISBN 978-81-288-2837-9.
- ——————— (26 March 2014). Namo Mantra of Narendra Modi. Diamond Pocket Books. ISBN 978-93-5083-644-6.
- Patel, Aakar (2021). Price of the Modi Years. Westland. ISBN 978-9391234225.
- Price, Lance (24 March 2015). The Modi Effect: Inside Narendra Modi's Campaign to Transform India. Quercus. ISBN 978-1-62365-939-4.
- Ralhan, O. P.; Gupta, Sudha Ralhan; Ralhan, Gautam (2017). Foreign Policy of Narendra Modi: The Prime Minister of India. Sarup Book Publishers (P) Limited. ISBN 978-93-5208-065-6.
- Sardesai, Rajdeep (22 May 2015). 2014: The Election that Changed India. Penguin India. ISBN 978-81-8475-010-2.
- Sharma, Mahesh (2015). Main Narendra Modi Bol Raha Hoon (in Hindi). Prabhat Prakashan. ISBN 978-93-5186-406-6.
- Shekhar, Himanshu (1901). Management Guru Narendra Modi. Diamond Pocket Books. ISBN 978-81-288-2803-4.
- Shukla, Sangeeta (27 October 2014). Narendra Modi: Great Personalities of India. Diamond Pocket Books. ISBN 9798128819017.
- ———————— (23 June 2016). Prernamurti Narendra Modi (in Hindi). Diamond Pocket Books. ISBN 978-81-288-1675-8.
- Singh, Sinderpal (16 February 2017). Modi and the World: (Re) Constructing Indian Foreign Policy. World Scientific. ISBN 978-981-320-387-7.
- Tharoor, Shashi (2018). The Paradoxical Prime Minister. Aleph Book Company. ISBN 978-938-829-217-7.
- Trivedi, Priya Ranjan (2014). Narendra Modi: The Man India Needs. Jnanada Prakashan (P&D). ISBN 978-81-7139-642-9.
- Ullekh, N. P. (26 January 2015). War Room: The People, Tactics and Technology Behind Narendra Modi's 2014 Win. Roli Books. ISBN 978-93-5194-068-5.
- Bhandari, Pradeep (1 March 2020). Modi Mandate 2019: Dispatches from Ground Zero. Rupa Publications. p. 224. ISBN 9789353339975.
- ———————— (19 April 2024). Modi 3.0: Bigger, Higher, Stronger. Om Books International. p. 216. ISBN 9788119750320.
- Singh, Ajay (11 July 2022). The Architect of the New BJP. Penguin India. ISBN 978-0670096961.
