= Narendra Jadhav =

Indian economist (born 1953)

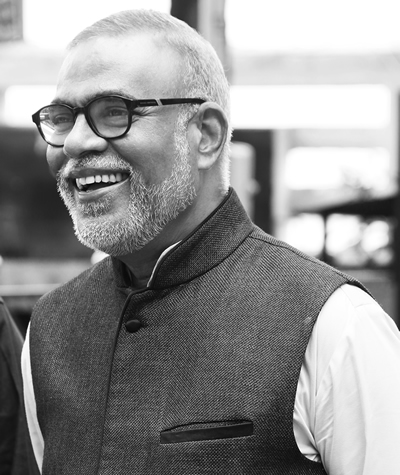
- Narendra Jadhav

Member of Parliament (Rajya Sabha) (Nominated)
- In office 25 April 2016 – 24 April 2022

Member, Planning Commission
- In office 16 June 2009 – 16 May 2014

Member, National Advisory Council
- In office 2010–2014

Vice-Chancellor of the Savitribai Phule Pune University
- In office 2006–2009

Chief Economic Counsellor Da Afghanistan Bank
- In office February 2006 – August 2006

Chief Economist Reserve Bank of India
- In office September 2004 – February 2006

Personal details
- Born: 28 May 1953 (age 73) Nashik, Bombay State, India
- Spouse: Vasundhara Jadhav
- Children: 2
- Education: Ramnarain Ruia College; University of Mumbai; Indiana University Bloomington, USA
- Occupation: Economist, educationist, professor, writer
- Website: www.drnarendrajadhav.info

Narendra Damodar Jadhav (born 28 May 1953) is an Indian economist, educationist, public policy expert, professor and writer in English, Marathi and Hindi.

Jadhav has been a Member of the Rajya Sabha, the upper house of Indian Parliament. He previously served as member of the Planning Commission of India and the National Advisory Council. Prior to this, he worked as Vice Chancellor of Savitribai Phule Pune University, International Monetary Fund (IMF) and headed economic research at the Reserve Bank of India.

== Early life and education ==
Narendra Damodar Jadhav was born on 28 May 1953 to a Mahar family from the village of Ozar (Nashik District) and grew up in Mumbai suburb of Wadala. In 1956, his family converted to Buddhism. He attended Chhabildas High School, Dadar. He completed his Bachelor of Science in Statistics from Ramnarain Ruia College, University of Mumbai in 1973 and Master of Arts in Economics from the University of Mumbai in 1975. He later earned a PhD in Economics from Indiana University Bloomington, United States in 1986.

== Professional career ==
=== Economist ===
As a career economist, Jadhav worked for 31 years with the Reserve Bank of India, and those of Afghanistan and Ethiopia. He also worked as Adviser in the International Monetary Fund for over four years. He retired in October 2008 from the position of Principal Adviser and Chief Economist of the RBI. His writings on economics include: Ambedkar – An Economist Extraordinaire (2016), Monetary Policy, Financial Stability and Central Banking in India (2006), Re-emerging India – A Global Perspective (2005) and Monetary Economics for India (1994).

=== Education ===
In 2006, Jadhav was appointed Vice Chancellor of the University of Pune.

=== Planning Commission ===
As a Member of the Planning Commission, Jadhav had a role in formulating the 12th Five Year Plan, especially in respect of Education and Skill Development. His contribution to formulation of the Rashtriya Uchchatar Shiksha Abhiyan (RUSA) scheme and developing the eco-system for Skills Development in India has been recognised. Equally noteworthy is his contribution to social justice through the Scheduled Caste Sub-Plan (SCSP), Tribal Sub-Plan (TSP) and Assessment and Monitoring Authority (AMA) for socio-religious communities.

=== National Advisory Council ===
As a Member of the National Advisory Council (NAC) Jadhav's notable contributions include formulation of National Food Security Bill, implementation of the Right to Education (RTE) Act 2009, and empowerment of SC, ST, Minorities and Denotified Nomadic Tribes (DNTs) through education, SC & ST Prevention of Atrocities, Rights of persons with Disabilities, Child Labour (Prohibition and Regulation) and Abolition of Manual Scavenging.

== Member of Parliament ==
In 2022, Jadhav completed his first term as an independent Member of Parliament in the Rajya Sabha.

== Writings ==
Jadhav, has written or edited 41 books in three languages – 21 in English, 13 in Marathi, and 7 in Hindi, besides over 300 research papers and articles. These include 21 books on Babasaheb Ambedkar and a trilogy on Rabindranath Tagore, comprising an analytical biography, and translation of selected poems, short stories, plays, parodies, articles and speeches.

=== English books ===
- Bharat Ratna Dr Babasaheb Ambedkar: An Intellectual Colossus, Great National Leader and Universal Champion of Human Rights Photo-Biography (Municipal Corporation of Greater Mumbai, 2016)
- Ambedkar: An Economist Extraordinaire (Konark Publishers, New Delhi, 2015) ISBN 9322008636
- Ambedkar: Awakening India’s Social Conscience (Konark Publishers, New Delhi, 2014) ISBN 9322008350
- Ambedkar Writes: Complete Writings of Dr Ambedkar (Edited) (2014) Volume I : Political Writings ISBN 9322008342
- Ambedkar Writes: Complete Writings of Dr Ambedkar (Edited) (2014) Volume II: Scholarly Writings (Sociology, Economics, Anthropology, Law, Constitution and Religion)(Konark Publishers, New Delhi, 2013) ISBN 9322008342
- Ambedkar Speaks: 301 Seminal Speeches (Edited) Volume I: Introduction, Autobiography Speeches, Guidance to Followers and Complete Bibliography ISBN 9789322008154
- Ambedkar Speaks: 301 Seminal Speeches (Edited) Volume II: Social, Economic, Religion, Law and Constitution ISBN 9789322008154
- Ambedkar Speaks: 301 Seminal Speeches (Edited) Volume III: Political Speeches (Konark Publishers, New Delhi) ISBN 9789322008154
- Untouchables: My Family’s Triumphant Journey Out of the Caste System in Modern India (California University Press, United States 2007 and Simon and Schuster, United States) ISBN 9780520252639
- Monetary Policy, Financial Stability and Central Banking in India (Macmillan India Ltd, New Delhi, 2006) ISBN 1403929025
- Re-emerging India – A Global Perspective (ICFAI University Press: Hyderabad, 2005) ISBN 8178817969
- Outcaste – A Memoir: Life and Triumphs of an Untouchable Family in India (Penguin, India, 2003) ISBN 0670049727
- Governors Speak (Edited) (Reserve Bank of India, 1997)
- CD Deshmukh Memorial Lectures (Edited) (Reserve Bank of India, 1996)
- Challenges to Indian Banking Competition, Globalization and Financial Markets (Edited) (Macmillan India Ltd, New Delhi, 1996) SBN: 0333930010
- Monetary Economics for India (Macmillan India Ltd, New Delhi, 1994) ISBN 033392603X
- Our Father and Us (Children's Edition, Korean) (Gimmyoung Publishers, Korea 2009)
- Dr Ambedkar: Economic Thoughts and Philosophy (Popular Prakashan, Mumbai, 1992) ISBN 8171547311
- Macroeconomic Investment Management in LDCs – A Social Cost Benefit Approach (Indiana University, United States, 1986)

=== Hindi books ===
- Dr Ambedkar : Atmakatha Evam Jansanvad (Prabhat Prakashan, New Delhi, 2015)ISBN 9789350485859
- Dr Ambedkar : Samajik Vichar Evam Darshan (Prabhat Prakashan, New Delhi, 2015) ISBN 9789350485866
- Dr Ambedkar : Arthik Vichar Evam Darshan (Prabhat Prakashan, New Delhi, 2015) ISBN 9789350485873
- Dr Ambedkar : Rajneeti, Dharm Aur Sanvidhan Vichar (Prabhat Prakashan, New Delhi, 2015) ISBN 9789350485880
- Vishwa Manav Rabindranath Tagore (Prabhat Prakashan, New Delhi, 2015) ISBN 9789351863250

=== Marathi books ===
- Yugpravartak Mahamanav – Bharat Ratna Dr Babasaheb Ambedkar (photo-biography, Brihan Mumbai Mahanagar Palika, 2016)
- Pradnya Surya Dr Ambedkar: Samagra Vyacharik Charitra (Granthali, Mumbai, 2014)
- Pradnya Mahamanavachi: Dr Babasaheb Ambedkar Samagra Lekhan Karya (Edited) Volume I: Rajkiya Lekhan
- Pradnya Mahamanavachi: Dr Babasaheb Ambedkar Samagra Lekhan Karya (Edited) Volume II: Artha Shastra, Samaj Shastra, Kayda-Sanvidhan Aani Dharma Shastra (Granthali, Mumbai, 2013)
- LASAVI Mazhya Samagra Abhivyakticha (Granthali, Mumbai, 2013)
- Bol Mahamanavache: 500 Marmabhedi Bhashane (Edited) Volume I: Atmanivedan, Anuyayi Margadarshan Aani Samagra Suchi
- Bol Mahamanavache: 500 Marmabhedi Bhashane (Edited) Volume II: Samajik, Arthik, Dharmik Aani Kayda — Sanvidhan Vishayak Bhashane
- Bol Mahamanavache: 500 Marmabhedi Bhashane (Edited) Volume III: Rajkiya Bhashane (Granthali, Mumbai, 2012)
- Ravindranath Tagore: Yuga Nirmata Vishvamanav (Granthali, Mumbai, 2011)
- Ravindranath Tagore: Samagra Sahitya Darshan (Granthali, Mumbai, 2011)
- Bhaya Shoonya Chitta Jeth: Ravindranathanchya 151 Pratinidhik Kavita (Granthali, Mumbai, 2010)
- Aamcha Baap Aan Amhi (Granthali, Mumbai. 1993)
- Dr Ambedkar: Arthik Vichar Aani Tatvadnyan (Sugava Prakashan, Pune, 1992)

== Autobiographical works ==
Jadhav's three autobiographical novels – Aamcha Baap Aan Amhi, (Marathi, 1993), Outcaste (English, 2002) and Untouchables (English, 2005) – depict the story of the struggle for human dignity by a Dalit family.
