= American Prometheus =

2005 biography of J. Robert Oppenheimer

American Prometheus: The Triumph and Tragedy of J. Robert Oppenheimer
- First edition cover, photo by Alfred Eisenstaedt
- Author: Kai Bird and Martin J. Sherwin
- Publisher: Alfred A. Knopf
- Publication date: April 5, 2005
- Pages: 721
- ISBN: 978-0-375-72626-2
- OCLC: 249029647
- Dewey Decimal: 530.092
- LC Class: QC16.O62 B57 2005

American Prometheus: The Triumph and Tragedy of J. Robert Oppenheimer is a 2005 biography of theoretical physicist J. Robert Oppenheimer, the leader of the Manhattan Project, which produced the first nuclear weapons, written by Kai Bird and Martin J. Sherwin over a period of 25 years. It won numerous awards, including the 2006 Pulitzer Prize for Biography or Autobiography.

The book chronicles Oppenheimer's rise to fame as "the father of the atomic bomb" and director of the Manhattan Project, as well as his tragic downfall due to his security hearing in the McCarthy era. The book shows efforts by Lewis Strauss and the FBI to undermine Oppenheimer. The bomb is regarded as a crucial turning point and a significant meeting between science and wartime weapons. This pivots Oppenheimer as an important historical figure and a symbol for atomic bomb ethics and political discourse about nuclear power. The book delves into various components of Oppenheimer's life inside and outside the Manhattan Project. His early life, ambitions, ideas, political activities, personal and professional relationships, misgivings about the bomb, complexities, and shortcomings are also discussed in the book.

The book served as inspiration for Christopher Nolan's 2023 biographical film Oppenheimer, starring Cillian Murphy as the theoretical physicist.

== Summary ==
The book includes five parts on different stages of Oppenheimer's life, as well as a prologue and epilogue.

=== Prologue ===
The prologue describes Oppenheimer's funeral and frames Oppenheimer's life as one of triumph and tragedy, a life of enigma, complexity, humanity, and love for his country. The prologue explains that the book is an attempt to elucidate Oppenheimer's life.

=== Part 1 ===
Part one of the book begins tracing Oppenheimer's childhood and early education at the Ethical Culture School and Harvard, describing Oppenheimer's precocious academic abilities, love for the nature of the southwestern United States, and passion for physics. Oppenheimer commented on his childhood, "My life as a child did not prepare me for the fact that the world is full of cruel and bitter things."

The authors recount Oppenheimer's emotional crisis at the University of Cambridge, his academic flourishing as a theoretical physicist at Göttingen, and his role as the founder of the theoretical physics program at the University of California, Berkeley. Versatile in many subjects, Oppenheimer formed his own cult of admirers, established an international reputation as a scientist, and developed an interest in the humanities and literature, including Hindu scriptures.

=== Part 2 ===
While a professor at Berkeley, Oppenheimer began an intense relationship with graduate student Jean Tatlock, which instilled a new interest in social and political activism. Amidst the Great Depression, Oppenheimer developed an appeal for the unemployed and migrant farmers and later gave donations for Spanish relief through the Communist Party of America (CPUSA) and funded refugees from Nazi Germany. At Berkeley, Oppenheimer held union meetings at his home and maintained an inner circle of students who became associated with left-wing activities. Oppenheimer's brother Frank joined the Communist Party to Robert's disapproval.

Despite Oppenheimer's activism, the book points out that his exact relationship with the communist party remains unclear. Reports of friends and associates such as Haakon Chevalier and FBI recordings could merely portray him as a fellow traveler. Never formally having a card and later denying he ever had a membership, Oppenheimer described his interaction with the party as "very brief and very intense."

With new developments in fission research and the United States' entrance into the war, Oppenheimer shifted away from union organization and cut off communist friends, believing that otherwise, the government would not allow him to work on a fission bomb project. Oppenheimer was convinced that the acquisition of the bomb before the Nazis was essential, even if there were a remote possibility the bomb could ignite the atmosphere. In spite of having no army security clearance, he became a key intellectual leader in the top secret research "Uranium Committee."

Leslie Groves was selected to lead the Manhattan Project to develop the first nuclear bomb. Impressed by Oppenheimer, Groves appointed him director of the Radiation Lab despite significant opposition that Oppenheimer was too impractical.

Part two ends by portraying what would be called the Chevalier Affair. Although many versions of the story exist, sources confirm that a friend asked Oppenheimer to provide confidential information for the Soviets, which Oppenheimer outright rejected. The affair would later become a crucial issue in Oppenheimer's security hearing.

=== Part 3 ===
At Los Alamos, Oppenheimer became the scientific director of the Manhattan Project and transformed into a charismatic, effective, organized administrator and patriotic leader. The book highlights how tight security, excess secrecy, and constant military surveillance burdened Oppenheimer and other scientists. Nevertheless, Oppenheimer met Jean Tatlock several times before discontinuing the relationship, after which she committed suicide.

Despite suspicion and doubts by subordinates, Oppenheimer eventually acquired a security clearance but soon after told authorities about the Chevalier incident. While Groves believed Oppenheimer and Oppenheimer asserted there was no security threat, Oppenheimer's decision to tell the story would become disastrous for his security hearing. Bird and Sherwin argue that Oppenheimer was committed to his trustworthiness as a scientist and the project's success rather than to an invariable loyalty to the United States.

Niels Bohr came to Los Alamos to discuss the implications of the bomb. He argued for openness to avoid a post-war nuclear arms race with Russia, a policy Oppenheimer would later promote. As one student noted, "Bohr was God, and Oppie was his prophet." The scientists at Los Alamos continued discussions on the moral and political ramifications of the "gadget" or atomic bomb.

After the defeat of the Nazis, colleagues of Oppenheimer began to doubt the purpose of the bomb and debated whether to use the bomb without warning or have a demonstration of the bomb for Japan. Oppenheimer supported the immediate use of the bomb, believing it might end all wars. Bird and Sherwin claim that Oppenheimer was unaware of any surrender talks by the Japanese.

The book describes the influential presence of Oppenheimer in the physical production of the bomb. After some crisis about the bomb design, Oppenheimer pressed for the plutonium implosion bomb with lenses. Part three ends by detailing the Trinity Test of the first nuclear bomb.

=== Part 4 ===
The book continues by exploring the events following the Trinity Test. Oppenheimer was aware of possible targets in Japan and would play a vital part in the efficiency of the atomic bombings of Hiroshima and Nagasaki. The authors recount Oppenheimer's serious qualms about the implications of the bombings and nuclear weapons. He later told President Truman, "I feel I have blood on my hands," a statement that would alienate the president from him.

Considered the father of the atomic bomb, Oppenheimer became a celebrity, icon, and a scientist-statesman who was now influential in American politics. Oppenheimer hoped using the bombs would prevent a nuclear arms race with Russia. He urged for a transparent international regulation of atomic weapons and energy but soon supported a more conservative defensive stance to proliferate American nuclear weapons due to apparent ideological differences between Russia and the United States.

As chairman of the General Advisory Committee (GAC) of the Atomic Energy Commission, Oppenheimer opposed the accelerated construction of the Super (H-bomb). Despite the government's decision to move forward with the bomb, Oppenheimer continued his role as chairman but remained an outspoken critic of the bomb.

Increased political influence led to greater surveillance by the FBI led by J. Edgar Hoover to investigate Oppenheimer's communist connections. Oppenheimer was asked to testify at a HUAC hearing and became an informant regarding former students' communist relations. In another meeting, Oppenheimer criticized communism and claimed he was "a resolute anti-communist" but continued to face suspicions and accusations of communist ties. The book shows how Oppenheimer, amidst a stalemate of Cold War policy, became more estranged from politics in Washington, while still fatefully trying to remain an insider.

Oppenheimer accepted an offer as director of the Institute for Advanced Study from Lewis Strauss, where he would try to advance both the sciences and humanities. However, Oppenheimer would eventually humiliate Strauss in a congressional hearing, increasing animosity between the two. Seeking revenge, Strauss began investigating Oppenheimer with the help of the FBI and initiated a campaign to suppress Oppenheimer's political influence and smear his reputation. As chairman of the AEC, Strauss pushed forward with nuclear secrecy and proliferation. Eventually, President Eisenhower attempted to cut off Oppenheimer from all government contacts and create a "blank wall" between the scientist and classified material.

The book also covers the stormy relationship between Katherine and Oppenheimer, in which Kitty appears extremely passionate and intense and Oppenheimer more disengaged. Kitty's desire for Oppenheimer to gain fame is also mentioned.

=== Part 5 ===
The last part of the book deals primarily with Oppenheimer's security hearing and its aftermath. The authors argue that the proceedings constituted a kangaroo court orchestrated by Lewis Strauss, in which Oppenheimer was intentionally humiliated. The hearing board concluded that Oppenheimer was a security threat due to his past conduct and associations, stance on the hydrogen bomb, and less than candid responses. A following letter claimed that "Dr. Oppenheimer was a Communist in every respect except for the fact that he did not carry a party card."

Oppenheimer's security clearance was revoked, and he became in the public eye a scientist-martyr and victim of McCarthyism. According to Bird and Sherwin, the hearing was a crucial turning point in the relations between scientists and the government and proved a defeat for American liberalism. Although an "exiled intellectual," he would continue to lecture, write and give speeches. Oppenheimer would eventually receive the Enrico Fermi Award, but only over fifteen years after the Trinity Test.

=== Epilogue ===
The epilogue covers the lives of Oppenheimer's family and children after his death from throat cancer. Frank became a successful theoretical physicist. Kitty took up sailing but later died of an embolism. Peter, Oppenheimer's son, would settle in New Mexico and start a family, and Toni, Oppenheimer's daughter, would eventually commit suicide.

== Production ==
Historian Martin J. Sherwin, who had previously written A World Destroyed: Hiroshima and Its Legacies (1975), started to work on the Oppenheimer biography in 1979, and signed the first contract with the publisher, Knopf, on March 13, 1980, for $70,000. Between 1979 and 1985 he conducted interviews "with 112 persons in his [Oppenheimer's] orbit", including his friend Haakon Chevalier, and his son Peter, who refused a formal interview. Sherwin gathered "some 50,000 pages of interviews, transcripts, letters, diaries, declassified documents and F.B.I. dossiers, stored in seemingly endless boxes in his basement, attic and office". After the deadline had come, and after his editor's retirement, Sherwin had still not finished the book. Thomas Powers writes that "historians of the subject, a small gossiping group, suggested that Sherwin was the latest victim of the curse of Oppenheimer". The book became a joke in Sherwin's family, and he said "that he was going to take the book to the grave".

In 1999 Sherwin invited his friend, writer and editor Kai Bird, who had already written two political biographies, to join him and put it together in a cohesive and readable format. At first Bird refused, but eventually agreed to work on the book, and both authors signed a new contract with Knopf, for a further $290,000. Bird wrote drafts that were then reviewed and rewritten by Sherwin.

The working title of the book was Oppie, but that was vetoed by their editor. Susan Goldmark, Bird's wife, suggested the new title: "Prometheus … fire … the bomb is this fire. And you could put 'American' there." Sherwin said that his friend Ronald Steel independently suggested the same title. First comparison of the physicists who made the bomb possible to Prometheus was in the Scientific Monthly in September 1945: "Modern Prometheans have raided Mount Olympus again and have brought back for man the very thunderbolts of Zeus." Some reviewers also connected the name of the book to Frankenstein; or, The Modern Prometheus by Mary Shelley.

== Reception ==
The Boston Globe wrote that the book "stands as an Everest among the mountains of books on the bomb project and Oppenheimer, and is an achievement not likely to be surpassed or equaled." Janet Maslin wrote in her New York Times review that "American Prometheus aligns its subject's most critical decisions with both his early education and his ultimate unraveling. It succeeds in deeply fathoming his most damaging, self-contradictory behavior." She noted that it is "a thorough examination and synthesis, sometimes overwhelming in its detail". Another reviewer notes that "there is no mathematics and very little physics. There is little about the engineering of the 'gadget' tested in the New Mexico desert on July 16, 1945."

Thomas Powers, in his review of several Oppenheimer biographies for The New York Review, noted that Sherwin had an advantage in writing Oppenheimer's biography in 1979. Many friends and colleagues of Oppenheimer were, at that time, still alive. Powers described the book as "clear in its purpose, deeply felt, persuasively argued, disciplined in form, and written with a sustained literary power", and notes the complex character of Oppenheimer:

But it is Oppenheimer the man, not general ideas about the nuclear age, that dominates these pages. Oppenheimer emerges in all his complexity — a brainy theorist but also an "underdogger", quick in his sympathy for those at the bottom of the social ladder; a sometime revolutionary who irritated former students like Philip Morrison with his talk after the war about "Dean" and "George"—Dean Acheson and George Marshall; devoted defender of his alcoholic wife Kitty but blind to her ego-crushing treatment of their son, Peter; lifelong friend of students like Serber, and betrayer of students like Rossi Lomanitz, Joseph Weinberg, and Bernard Peters, whom he simply threw to the Red-hunting wolves.

Frank A. Settle called the book "meticulously researched" and "the most comprehensive biography to date". Braham Dabscheck notes the "scholarship of the highest order". John S. Rigden calls the book "well written and almost free of serious errors", and that "reading this worthy book is a gripping experience: It stimulates the mind and stirs the emotions."

Thomas A. Julian critiqued the book and the authors, writing that "[t]hey still assert, despite the conclusive evidence to the contrary ... that Japan was already defeated and wanted to 'surrender'", and that they "ignore disturbing evidence provided from former Soviet sources that Oppenheimer might have provided information to the Soviet Union about the U.S. atomic bomb project".

== Awards ==
- 2005 National Book Critics Circle Award
- 2006 Pulitzer Prize for Biography or Autobiography
- 2008 Duff Cooper Prize

== Film adaptation ==
British-American filmmaker Christopher Nolan began work on an Oppenheimer biopic in 2019 following a gift, a book of Oppenheimer's speeches, from British actor Robert Pattinson, who starred in Nolan's film Tenet. Nolan continued a newfound interest in Oppenheimer, reading American Prometheus, and decided to base his screenplay on the book, centering on the security clearance hearings. Since 2015, the adaptation rights were owned by producer J. David Wargo, who agreed to work alongside Nolan.

Nolan met with Bird as Sherwin had been diagnosed with cancer and was not able to travel. Bird read the script prior to filming:

"Nolan covers in a very deft way the argument among the physicists over whether the bomb was necessary or not and has Oppenheimer after Hiroshima saying the bomb was used on a virtually already defeated enemy," Bird adds. "People who know nothing about Oppenheimer will go thinking they're going to see a movie about the father of the atomic bomb." Instead, "they're going to see this mysterious figure and a deeply mysterious biographical story."

Budgeted at $100 million, the resulting film, titled Oppenheimer, was released on July 21, 2023, to critical and commercial acclaim. Written and directed by Nolan, it stars Cillian Murphy as Oppenheimer.

Nolan said that "I don't think I ever would have taken this on without Kai and Martin's book", and Murphy said to Bird during production that the book is "mandatory reading around here". According to Nolan, "he envisioned Oppenheimer not as a biography ('a formula that you write into can be creatively stifling') but more like "a thriller, a heist film, a courtroom drama". Nolan also said:

What I wanted to do was take the audience into the mind and the experience of a person who sat at the absolute center of the largest shift in history. Like it or not, J. Robert Oppenheimer is the most important person who ever lived. He made the world we live in, for better or for worse.
