= Martin J. Sherwin =

American historian (1937–2021)

- Born: Martin Jay Sherwin; July 2, 1937; Brooklyn, New York, U.S.
- Died: October 6, 2021 (aged 84); Washington, D.C., U.S.

Academic background
- Education: Dartmouth College (BA); University of California, Los Angeles (PhD)

Academic work
- Discipline: History
- Sub-discipline: History of nuclear weapons
- Institutions: George Mason University; Tufts University; Princeton University; University of California, Berkeley; University of Pennsylvania

Martin Jay Sherwin (July 2, 1937 – October 6, 2021) was an American historian. His scholarship mostly concerned the history of nuclear weapons and nuclear proliferation. He served on the faculty at Princeton University, the University of Pennsylvania, the University of California, Berkeley, and as the Walter S. Dickson Professor of English and American History at Tufts University, where he founded the Nuclear Age History and Humanities Center.

== Early life and education ==
Sherwin was born on July 2, 1937, in Brooklyn, New York, to Mimi (nee Karp) and Harold Sherwin. His mother was a homemaker who also worked administrative jobs while his father was a children's clothing manufacturer. He graduated from James Madison High School in Brooklyn after which he enrolled in Dartmouth College aiming to pursue medicine. However, he went on to study geology and philosophy, eventually graduating in 1959 with a Bachelor of Arts degree in history. Sherwin earned his PhD in history at the University of California, Los Angeles. His doctoral thesis, studying Harry S. Truman's atomic strategy, became his first book, A World Destroyed.

== Career ==
After completing his bachelors, Sherwin briefly worked for the United States Navy, serving as an intelligence officer in Hawaii and Japan. He joined Tufts University as a member of the faculty in 1980 and established the Center for Nuclear Age History and Humanities at Tufts. He also worked with Russian physicist Evgeny Velikhov to establish a collaboration for students at Tufts and Moscow State University. He retired from Tufts in 2007. He also taught at George Mason University and Princeton University.

Sherwin's research focused on nuclear weapons, ranging from their initial development at the Los Alamos National Laboratory, as a part of the Manhattan Project; the atomic bombings of Hiroshima and Nagasaki; and the Cuban Missile Crisis, a part of the Cold War standoff between the Soviet Union and the United States in 1962. He advocated for better safety controls, improved communications systems, and an overall reduction of nuclear warheads, arguing that World War III was averted largely by chance and the threat of a nuclear disaster still loomed large.

He collaborated with co-author Kai Bird on a biography of J. Robert Oppenheimer, "father of the atomic bomb", titled American Prometheus. Sherwin worked on the book for two decades before collaborating with Bird to finish it. Sherwin and Bird shared the 2006 Pulitzer Prize for Biography or Autobiography for the work.

Sherwin also wrote A World Destroyed: Hiroshima and Its Legacies, which won the Stuart L. Bernath Prize and the National Historical Society's American History Book Prize. A previous book on nuclear policy was a runner-up for the Pulitzer.

Gambling with Armageddon: Nuclear Roulette from Hiroshima to the Cuban Missile Crisis was published in October 2020 and received positive reviews from The New York Times Book Review and Booklist, among others.

Sherwin served on the board of The Nation, to which he was a regular contributor.

== Works ==
- A World Destroyed: Hiroshima and Its Legacies (various editions, 1975, 1987, 2003)
- American Prometheus: The Triumph and Tragedy of J. Robert Oppenheimer, (2005), with Kai Bird
- Gambling with Armageddon: Nuclear Roulette from Hiroshima to the Cuban Missile Crisis (2020)

== Personal life ==
Sherwin was married to Susan (née Smukler), with whom he lived in Washington, D.C., and Aspen, Colorado. They had a son and a daughter; his daughter pre-deceased him in 2010. He died in Washington on October 6, 2021, of lung cancer.
