= Prabhat Prakashan =

Indian publishing house

- Status: Active
- Founded: 1958
- Founder: Shyam Shundar Agarwal
- Country of origin: India
- Headquarters location: New Delhi
- Distribution: Worldwide
- Key people: Shyam Sunder Agarwal, Prabhat Kumar, Piyush Kumar and Pawan Kumar
- Publication types: Books & E-books
- Nonfiction topics: More than 4500 Hindi books
- Fiction genres: Novels, Autobiography, Biography, Motivational, Competition, learning, Articles : Essay : Letter Book by Kalam, Devotional Studies, Environment, Memoir : Travel memoirs : Tourism Play : Drama, Satire Students : GK Astrology Business : Economics : Management Dictionary : Encyclopedia Fiction : Stories Military : Defence Poem, Science, Vivekananda Literature, Autobiographies Computer : Internet, Education, Health & Yoga, Novel, Political, Sports, Biography, Cookery, English Language Teaching, Library Science, Personality Development : Self-Help Quiz Book, Stories
- Imprints: Ocean Books, Prabhat Paperbacks
- Official website: prabhatbooks.com

Prabhat Prakashan is an Indian publishing house. It was co-founded in 1958 by Shyam Sunder Agarwal. They publish books in English and Hindi languages.
