= Uday Mahurkar =

Indian journalist, political analyst and author

- Born: Uday Mahurkar; September 28, 1962 (age 63); Indore, Madhya Pradesh, India
- Education: Maharaja Sayajirao University
- Occupation: Writer
- Years active: 1983 – present

Uday Mahurkar (born 28 September 1962) is an Indian journalist, political analyst and author. He was a deputy editor at the India Today group. In October 2020, he was appointed as the Information Commissioner by the Government of India and served there until 6 November 2023.

== Early life ==
Mahurkar was born in Indore, Madhya Pradesh. His family moved to Gujarat after independence. He was educated in Baroda, a former Maratha Princely state. He graduated in Indian history and culture and archaeology from Maharaja Sayajirao University in 1983 and joined The Indian Express in the same year as a sub-editor at Ahmedabad.

In 2017, Mahurkar wrote the book Marching with a Billion about the model of Narendra Modi's governance as prime minister. The book's foreword was written by the economist Professor Klaus Schwab, the founder and architect of the World Economic Forum.

== Books ==
- Marching with a Billion published by Penguin Random House India
- Centrestage published by Random House India
- Veer Savarkar: The Man Who Could Have Prevented Partition (2021) published by Rupa Publications India ISBN 9789355200488
- Nation First
