= List of Mann Ki Baat episodes =

Mann Ki Baat is a radio series on All India Radio in India. The show is hosted by the current Prime Minister of India, Narendra Modi.

== Series overview ==
=== By season ===
Season	Episodes	Originally aired	
Season	Episodes	First aired	Last aired
1	53	3 October 2014	24 February 2019
2	57	30 June 2019	25 February 2024
3	27	30 June 2024	30 August 2026

=== By year ===
Year	Episodes	Originally aired	
Year	Episodes	First aired	Last aired
2014	3	3 October 2014	14 December 2014
2015	12	27 January 2015	27 December 2015
2016	12	31 January 2016	25 December 2016
2017	12	29 January 2017	31 December 2017
2018	12	28 January 2018	30 December 2018
2019	9	27 January 2019	29 December 2019
2020	12	26 January 2020	27 December 2020
2021	12	31 January 2021	26 December 2021
2022	12	30 January 2022	25 December 2022
2023	12	29 January 2023	31 December 2023
2024	9	28 January 2024	29 December 2024
2025	12	26 January 2025	28 December 2025
2026	8	25 January 2026	30 August 2026

== Episodes ==
=== Season 1 (2014–2019) ===
==== List of episodes in 2014 ====
No.	Year	Date	Ref.
1	2014	3 October	
After wishing Vijayadashami, Modi urged the listeners to purchase Khadi clothes to contribute to the prosperity of the poor. He also discussed the Swachh Bharat Abhiyan, the success of India's Mars Mission, skill development and disabled children. Modi also discussed various letters and ideas written to him by the citizens of the country.
2	2014	2 November	
Modi discussed several Government initiatives, including a scholarship for disabled children and grants to educational institutions for developing infrastructure for such children. He also discussed the positive effects of Swachh Bharat Abhiyan on health. He paid tributes to Indian soldiers, whom he had visited during Diwali in Siachen area. Modi also discussed how sales of khadi had gone up after the mention made in the first episode.
3	2014	14 December	
Modi discussed drug abuse, and appealed to the youth to say no to drugs. He also said that the money spent on drugs might be used for funding terrorism. He stated that a toll-free helpline would be set up to help drug addicts and their families. Modi wished everyone a Merry Christmas and the very best for the New Year.

==== List of episodes in 2015 ====
No.	Year	Date	Ref.
4	2015	27 January	
The US President Barack Obama co-hosted the show with Modi. Obama noted how he was told that this was the "first ever radio address by an Indian Prime Minister and an American President together". Both answered a series of questions from Indian citizens. Modi urged listeners to write in online using the hashtag #YesWeCan.
5	2015	22 February	
Modi addressed students, asking them to avoid exam stress and compete with themselves, not others. He said, "This (examination) is not going to be the end of life.... Life is much bigger than just academic examinations." and urged parents not to compare their child's performance with others.
6	2015	22 March	
Modi discussed issues of concern to farmers, like soil health, right value for yield and land acquisition. He clarified many misunderstandings about the recent Land Act. Additionally, he addressed several concerns and questions voiced to him by the farmers of India.
7	2015	26 April	
PM Modi promised that his government will find a solution to the ‘One rank One Pension’ issue soon. He spoke in length about the new initiatives taken up by his government to fight poverty in the country. The prime minister also congratulated students on their success in the board exams and urged them to choose a career that would help India.
8	2015	31 May	
Modi spoke of International Yoga Day, Kisan TV channel and urged people to take care of themselves as well as the birds and animals during the heatwave. Modi also said that One rank One Pension is complicated and not as simple as he thought it was.
9	2015	28 June	
PM Modi spoke about yoga happening all over the world, at France's River Seine and Eiffel Tower, at America's Times Square and Australia's Opera House and even the UN Peace Keeping Force and Indian soldiers at Siachen and by the Indian Navy on their ships and by the citizens at Rajpath. Modi also gave the example of a Vietnamese child doing yoga. Modi urge IT professionals to work towards the mission of spreading yoga. Modi then went to talk about other issues such as that "the work of constructing toilets by the people is on the verge of completion". He also promoted the Beti Bachao, Beti Padhao Yojana and Selfie With Daughter concept.
10	2015	26 July	
PM Modi paid tribute to those who died in the Kargil War and added that "Kargil (war) was not just fought on the borders, but India's every village, city and town has made a contribution." Modi talked about the Deendayal Upadhyaya Gram Jyoti Yojana, to provide electricity to every village in India. He also noted the declining interest in science and technology.
11	2015	30 August	
PM Modi covered various topics such as Jan Dhan Yojana, the 1965 war, the amazing work that Indian scientists are doing, Swachh Bharat and the land acquisition act for farmers.
12	2015	20 September	
Modi thanked everyone for a successful one year of Mann Ki Baat. Modi talked about Subhas Chandra Bose and how Bose had launched the Azad Hind Radio. He also mentioned the silent revolution of LPG subsidies.
13	2015	25 October	
The prime minister spoke about no interview in non-gazette government jobs for Group B, C and D posts and gold monetisation. Modi talked about how the government had acquired the house of BR Ambedkar in United Kingdom. He talked about the message of peace and harmony in his address.
14	2015	29 November	
PM Modi talked about farming and stubble burning after a question was put forward on the MyGov.in website. He also talked about how in 1996 terrorists had shot Jawed Ahmed in Kashmir. Modi described how he despite being disabled he fought back from his injuries. Modi appealed for organ donations, talked about ASHA workers, talked about climate change as well as MUDRA banks.
15	2015	27 December	
Modi mentioned how the 125th birth anniversary of B. R. Ambedkar, the maker of the Indian Constitution, will be celebrated in 2016. Modi urged citizens to clean and keep clean the statues of the great men and woman around them in preparation for Republic Day. He also read out letters by citizens on topics such as cleanliness, disabilities and the "Ease of Doing Business".

==== List of episodes in 2016 ====
No.	Year	Date	Ref.
16	2016	31 January	
Modi started by saying that the day before he went to pay homage to Mahatma Gandhi at Rajghat and other martyrs to express gratitude to those who laid down their lives for the country. Other issues discussed included Khadi, the girl child, cleaning statues of great personalities as Swachta Abhiyan and Samman Abhiyan, Sikkim becoming an organic state, farmers and Fasal Beema Yojana and the International Fleet Review 2016 and the South Asian Federation games being held in India.
17	2016	28 February	
PM Modi shared my his thoughts on examinations and related issues. Sachin Tendulkar, chess champion Vishwanathan Anand and spiritual leader Morari Bapu also shared their thoughts on the topic for the listeners. Modi also took the examples of Srinivas Ramanujam and J.K. Rowling. Modi continued by saying students should not worry about "How much did I score?" but to focus on the greater things in life. He read various messages that had been sent to him. Modi also talked about the Government's decision to install a Laser Interferometer Gravitational-Wave Observatory (LIGO) in India (INDIGO).
18	2016	27 March	
PM Modi started off by extending warmest of greetings to everybody for Easter. Modi talked about sports, the T-20 Cricket World Cup, how India would be hosting the FIFA Under-17 World Cup, football leagues such as the English Premier League, Spanish League and the Indian Super League matches. Modi went on to thank Coal India and talk about Eco-friendly Mine-tourism. Sounds bytes from Abhi Chaturvedi, Shilpa Kukke were played. Digital India, the Kisan Mela, 'Farmers' Fair', World Health Day and free Microscopy Centres to get a health checkup. Modi ended by wishing everybody an auspicious New Year, Vikram Samvat, Gudi Padva, Ugadi.
19	2016	24 April	
Modi started off by talking about water shortage problems in various areas of the country and how the citizens are making efforts to correct this. The effort to clean the Ganga was also talked about; whether it is possible or not. Modi also talked about this day being known as Panchayati Raj Day and how 14 April had been Ambedkar Jayanti birthday. The NCC, NSS and the Bharat Scouts and Guides, Red Cross and the Nehru Yuva Kendra were also talked about. Modi mentioned a listeners comment of how only negative things are highlighted by the media.
20	2016	22 May	
Water conversation, the board exams, mobile banking, sports and the Olympic games and the coming International Day for Yoga were talked about.
21	2016	26 June	
Modi talked about how the rains have started in parts of the nation and wished all the farmers for the Monsoon. Scientists were also talked about, including college students who made a satellite that had recently been launched. Modi talked that from the results of the recent examination shows how well 'Beti Bachao, Beti Padhao' is doing. Modi also praised officers Avani Chaturvedi, Bhawana Kanth and Mohana Singh. 25–26 June 1975, the Emergency, was also brought up and how democracy is India's strength and talked about related issues such as how public participation is essential in a democracy. He also talked about a government scheme related to undisclosed incomes.
22	2016	31 July	
PM Modi said that the "Future will be technology driven, embrace it." He also said that the key to future is technology and to lead, one must innovate and participate in nation building process. Modi also talked about the Atal Innovation Mission (AIM) and the death anniversary of President Abdul Kalam. Various health issues were also talked about.
23	2016	28 August	
Modi talked about how he got a lot of messages from listeners regarding sports. He mentioned that 29 August was National Sports Day, a tribute to Dhyan Chand.Sarvepalli Radhakrishnan was also mentioned. Modi praised those who did well in the Rio Olympics such as Dipa Karmakar, Lalita Babar, Abhinav Bindra and Vikas Krishan Yadav. Modi also talked about Kashmir and mentioned how if a life is lost in Kashmir, a youth or security persons, that loss is India's loss.
24	2016	25 September	
The Uri Attack was mentioned, the 18 martyred soldiers were given a tribute and that the culprits would be revenged.
25	2016	30 October	
PM Modi greets listeners a happy Diwali. This month's episode sees citizens from various corners of the nation addressing their questions and suggestions to PM Modi. He talked about the hashtag Sandesh2Soldiers.
26	2016	27 November	
Modi talks about India's commitment towards demonetisation. Also he shared some cases, wherein people adopted creative techniques to tackle the discomfort of demonetisation. PM assured that these inconveniences are temporary and things will get back to normal soon. PM Modi announced that we should move to LESS-CASH society and suggested people to adopt e-banking and mobile banking techniques for its achievement. He requested students and youth, which make up to 65% of total population of India, to educate the illiterate and poor people of India about the advantages of the same.
27	2016	25 December	
The PM talked about digital banking and a cashless economy.

==== List of episodes in 2017 ====
No.	Year	Date	Ref.
28	2017	29 January	
Modi talks about the mindsets that the youth should possess about exams.
29	2017	26 February	
Prime Minister appreciated ISRO's recent achievements. He says, "The world has taken notice of India's achievements. This cost effective, efficient space programme of ISRO has become a marvel for the entire world. Modi also mentioned about Digidhan Fought Corruption and requested citizens to promote BHIM, which is a Mobile App developed by National Payments Corporation of India (NPCI)."
30	2017	26 March	
Topics covered cleanliness, sports and health. The PM urged people to shift to digital payments.
31	2017	30 April	
Topics covered included Easter wishes, thinking out of the box culture, VIP culture, food wastage. The PM urged the youth to do new things during their summer vacations. Other topics raised were climate change and rising temperatures.
32	2017	28 May	
Topics covered included Ramzan, birthday of Veer Savarkar, yoga, cleanliness, peaceful coexistence.
33	2017	25 June	
Topics covered included sports and how children should be motivated to play a sport if they are naturally good at it. Other topics included praise for ISRO scientists, yoga and democracy.
34	2017	30 July	
PM Modi covered the impact of floods across India and the performance by the Indian Women's cricket team. Topics covered included GST, and history of India. He invited people to suggest a topic which he could include in his Independence Day speech.
35	2017	27 August	
Mention of Paryushan Parva and other festivals. PM Modi talked about bargaining with poor shopkeepers, Pradhan Mantri Jan Dhan Yojana, Teachers’ Day, cleanliness and sports.
36	2017	24 September	
PM Modi spoke about the number of ideas he receives from people all over India. He talked about how topics talked in previous editions of Mann Ki Baat have turned out successfully. This includes 'Selfie with Daughter', 'Incredible India' and an increase in khadi sales. He also talked about the efforts towards cleanliness by individuals. He also talked about the educational potential of tourism within the country.
37	2017	29 October	
After wishing Chhath Puja and talking about Children's Day, Diwali, he went on to cover multiple topics such as Khadi, soldiers, Hansa Mehta, peacekeeping operations as well as training peacekeepers, importance of sports, and Sardar Patel's anniversary.
38	2017	26 November	
Multiple topics were covered such as Eid e Milad un Nabi, he praised disabled achievers, soil health card, he praised the martyrs and survivors of the Mumbai attacks, praised soldiers and mentioned how he had got time to visit them during Diwali celebrations.
39	2017	31 December	
Modi talks about cleanliness, separation of garbage, registration and importance of new millennial voters, and his dream for a new India and the role of positivity in bringing about change.

==== List of episodes in 2018 ====
No.	Year	Date	Ref.
40	2018	28 January	
Mentioned how 10 nations attended Republic Day, how women are excelling, inspiration such as Kalpana Chawla, and the Padma Awards. He shared how a listener came to know of a government scheme called Pradhan Mantri Jan Aushadhi Yojana and another listener mentioned Mission Clean Morna River.
41	2018	25 February	
PM Modi begins with science related points, mention of National Science Day, Bharat Ratna and Nobel Prize awardee Sir C. V. Raman. Mention of National Safety Day, National Disaster Management Authority. Use of animal dung is covered. 'Trash Mahotsav' and International Women's Day and how electricity has reached the furthest of villages in Elephanta island is mentioned.
42	2018	25 March	
Prime Minister talks about preventive healthcare. He suggested that yoga as a form of preventive healthcare and urged people to adopt it as soon as possible.
43	2018	29 April	
The PM congratulates Commonwealth Games 2018 winners. Mentions Fit India movement and yoga. Mentions Swachh Bharat Summer Internship, need to conserve water, Ramzan and Buddha Purnima.
44	2018	27 May	
PM Modi talked about plastic pollution and asked people not to use low grade plastics. Mentioned World Environment Day, planting saplings and ensuring their survival. PM Modi mentioned India's contribution to COP21 and Paris agreements and India's initiative of International Solar Alliance. International Yoga Day was also mentioned.
45	2018	24 June	
PM Modi highlighted Yoga Day, mentioned how India's armed forces did Yoga on land, air and sea including at Siachen Glacier. Jallianwala Bagh massacre was mentioned as well as Afghanistan's first test match against India. Anniversary of Syama Prasad Mukherjee and GST were mentioned.
46	2018	29 July	
PM Modi mentioned Ekta Bhyan and Hima Das winning in their respective sporting events. Mentioned Lokmanya Tilak's death anniversary. He mentioned a number of saints such as Gyaneshwar and Namdev. Inspiring stories for students were shared. Thai cave rescue operation was mentioned. Guru Nanak and yoga were also mentioned.
47	2018	26 August	
For this episode PM Modi got a phone call in Sanskrit. He congratulated India's community of engineers. He praised 2018 Asian Games winners. He mentioned the monsoon season of the Parliament and remembered PM Atal Bihari Vajpayee. PM Modi also spoke about the 2018 Kerala floods. He also extended Janmashtami greetings and Raksha Bandhan greetings
48	2018	30 September	
PM Modi spoke on a wide range of topics. He remembered the 2016 surgical strikes. He mentioned Abhilash Tomy and the Golden Global Race. The role of the Indian Air Force in addressing the gender gap was also talked about. He also mentioned Gandhi Jayanti.
49	2018	28 October	
A large range of topics were covered such as Run for Unity, that a Statue of Unity has been built to pay homage to Sardar Patel on his birth anniversary, Asian Para Games and stubble burning.
50	2018	25 November	
Modi's 50th 'Mann Ki Baat' address was all about his gratitude. He thanked and paid tribute to the makers of the Indian Constitution, especially B. R. Ambedkar, saying he played a pivotal role in drafting the Constituent Assembly. The prime minister also paid a tribute to Guru Nanak Dev in the address.
51	2018	30 December	
A number of topics were covered. Swacchh Bharat and free medical camps by Bjinor doctors. PM Modi also mentioned positive websites and Eat Right India campaign. He congratulated sportspersons for their success. PM Modi mentioned a large number of upcoming festivals such as Vishu, Pongal, Lohri, Sankranti and Magh Bihu. He mentioned the launch of Sardar Patel Award and 150th birth anniversary of Mahatma Gandhi.

==== List of episodes in 2019 ====
No.	Year	Date	Ref.
52	2019	27 January	
PM Modi recalled achievements of 2018 including the launch of the health insurance scheme Ayushman Bharat and how electricity has reached all of India's villages. PM Modi paid respect to Shivakumara Swami. He also talked about India's history and tributes to Subhas Chandra Bose and a museum to Jalianwala Bagh, Yaad-e-Jalian.
53	2019	24 February	
A number of subjects were covered such as the Padma Awards, Prime Minister Morarji Desai's birth anniversary and the importance of the 44th Constitutional amendment during his tenure, Birsa Munda, Jamsetji Tata and the Pulwama terror attack and 'Pariksha Pe Charcha'. No Mann Ki Baat episodes aired in March, April, and May due to elections.

=== Season 2 (2019–2024) ===
==== List of episodes in 2019 ====
No.	Year	Date	Ref.
54	2019	30 June	
This was the first episode following the 2019 Indian general election, and the first episode of Season 2. PM Modi conveyed his thoughts about The Emergency, water scarcity in India and Yoga.
55	2019	28 July	
On the second episode of Season 2, Modi talked about Chandrayaan-2 as well as a new competition for students. He also encouraged the Indian youth to participate in a quiz (Note: The quiz was live from 10 August 2019 to 20 August 2019 (and then extended till 25 August 2019) on the MyGov app, with the winner congratulated and getting a chance to see a live landing of Chandrayaan-2 with Prime Minister Narendra Modi on 7 September at the Sriharikota space centre.) on MyGov about the developments of India in the areas of science and space.
56	2019	25 August	
The Prime Minister spoked about various festivals in the next two months, about an art exhibition of Mahatma Gandhi at Venice Biennale, Swachh Bharat, addressing malnutrition through initiatives such as 'Mutthi Bhar Dhaanya' initiative in Nashik district. He mentioned his Man vs. Wild episode and environmental challenges.
57	2019	29 September	
In this episode Modi shared a conversation with veteran singer Lata Mangeshkar in which he greeted her on the occasion of her birthday. Issues highlighted during the show were - helping the poor on the occasion of various festivals, getting rid of single use plastic, E-cigarette ban and Plogging.
58	2019	27 October	
The PM spoke about the Ayodhya land dispute verdict of 2010. He recalled how efforts had been made to polarise the country but despite best efforts unity prevailed.
59	2019	24 November	
PM Modi thanked the citizens for accepting the Supreme Court's Ram Janmabhoomi verdict peacefully. he spoke about Fit India Week, National Cadet Corps (NCC) day, Armed Forces Flag Day, Pushkaram festival and the efforts of scuba divers in cleaning a beach in Visakhapatnam.
60	2019	29 December	
Modi talked about India moving ahead in astronomy, mentioning the Inter University Centre for Astronomy and Astrophysics (IUCAA) and TIFR-National Centre for Radio Astrophysics (NCRA) among other institutions; and also talked about star gazing. Talking about the role of the youth in nation building, the PM said that "Our youth hate anarchy, instability and disorder and dislike casteism and nepotism."

==== List of episodes in 2020 ====
No.	Year	Date	Ref.
61	2020	26 January	
Modi said violence is not the solution, and those who have adopted it should come back to the mainstream and have faith in the ability to sort out issues peacefully. Modi also talked about the resettlement of the Bru-Reang refugees and sports.
62	2020	23 February	
PM Modi urged people to visit Hunar Haat near India Gate in Delhi. He said that nearly three lakh artisans have gained opportunities of employment through the fest.
63	2020	29 March	
PM Modi focused on the COVID-19 pandemic in India.
64	2020	26 April	
PM Modi focused on the actions and contributions of Indian citizens in fighting the COVID-19 pandemic. He praised farmers for maintaining food demands. Modi emphasized on the practice of wearing masks as the new normal. The government's COVID Warriors website was also mentioned in addition to the 12.5 million volunteers who have joined.
65	2020	31 May	
India's success in tackling covid, the lifting of restrictions on travel, the need to still maintain distance and covid 19 protocols such as wearing a mask. He talked about harvesting rainwater, Cyclone Amphan and a recent locust attack.
66	2020	28 June	
PM Modi talked about self-reliance, Galwan, migrant workers and the pandemic among other things. He requested the young listeners to interview their grandparents.
67	2020	26 July	
With regard to Kargil Vijay Diwas, "On this day, we defeated Pakistan [...] India wanted good relations with pakistan, but that did not happen." Modi also spoke about the pandemic and madhubani masks. Topics such as sports and entrepreneurship were also covered.
68	2020	30 August	
Topics covered included Onam, apps and toys made in India, Teachers' Day and working dogs in the security forces.
69	2020	27 September	
PM Modi talked about storytelling in India; Hitopadesha and Panchatantra. Farmers were also talked about. The anniversary of the surgical strikes were also mentioned.
70	2020	25 October	
PM Modi talked about festivals and to remember to be 'vocal for local' when buying gifts. Khadi, Mallakhamba, pencil making in Pulwama, soldiers along the border were also mentioned.
71	2020	29 November	
PM Modi talked about the 550th Parkash Parv of Guru Nanak. He also spoke about digitisation and AI based restoration and preservation of the paintings of Ajanta Caves by Benoy K. Behl and Ashwin Srivastava.
72	2020	27 December	

==== List of episodes in 2021 ====
No.	Year	Date	Ref.
73	2021	31 January	
Topics covered included the farmers' protest, the vaccination drive against COVID-19, and the Indian cricket team performance in Australia.
74	2021	28 February	
PM Modi mentioned how he has updated his book Exam Warriors. A listener asked Modi if there is any regret he has and he said that it was not being able to learn Tamil language. Mentioned National Science Day, Atmanirbhar Bharat and 'Lab to Land' tagline. He mentioned the environmental efforts by the temples of Assam and how water conservation and minimal interference has helped conserve birds at Kaziranga National Park.
75	2021	28 March	
PM Modi talked about the episode being the 75th episode and how far Mann Ki Baat has come. He talked about coronavirus and the impact it has had on Indian society. He mentioned Mitali Raaj's achievements, how light houses can be connected to tourism, bee farming, documentation of Karbi language and World Sparrow Day. Toys made by St. Teresa's College in Kochi, Kerala were praised. He talked about festivals and the upcoming Easter.
76	2021	25 April	
PM Modi talked about coronavirus and the need to get vaccinated.
77	2021	30 May	
Various topics were covered such as coronavirus, oxygen shortage, scaling of Covid testing labs and tests, cyclone Amphan and cyclone Nisarg, and a record of farming production, Kisan Rail, and seven years of government.
78	2021	27 June	
Topics covered included Tokyo Olympics and support for India's Olympians. Aspects connected to the ongoing pandemic were covered such as vaccine hesitancy and the role of doctors and other health workers.
79	2021	25 July	
Kargil Vijay Diwas and the upcoming 75th Independence Day were mentioned. 3D printing, water conservation and a renovated Gurudwara in Singapore were talked about.
80	2021	29 August	
PM Modi begins by mentioning Major Dhyan Chand, sports and the youth, how Indore comes at the top in Swachh Bharat results, the role of Sanskrit in culture and Janmashtami and Bhalka Teerth.
81	2021	26 September	
PM Modi talks about the importance of maintained covid protocols during the upcoming festival season. He talks about getting vaccinated. He talks about achieving record khadi sales and the handloom, cottage industry. The PM mentions World Rivers Day and Namami Gange. The Prime Minister also mentioned how eight specially-abled persons set a world record by travelling to Kumar Post at Siachen Glacier. He also mentioned One Teacher, One Call campaign.
82	2021	24 October	
PM Modi congratulated the country and healthcare workers on its vaccination drive, birth anniversary of Sardar Patel, a government held competition on rangoli, Hansa Mehta, women joining the security forces, and drone technology.
83	2021	28 November	
Students from five countries participated in 'Azadi Ki Kahani – Bachchon Ki Zubani' programme, Janajati Gaurav Saptah or Tribal Pride Day, remembering Rani Durgavati through Dastangoi, Navy Day and Armed Forces Flag Day, Sacred India Gallery in Australia, Vrindavan, Rani Laxmibai, Thoothukudi, revival of Noon river, and startups.
84	2021	26 December	
The PM emphasizes that Mann Ki Baat is about grassroots level changemakers and not government achievements. He mentions covid and India's response to it. He talks about the importance of reading, and Swachh Bharat.

==== List of episodes in 2022 ====
No.	Year	Date	Ref.
85	2022	30 January	
PM Modi mentioned the National War Memorial, corruption and the Padma Awards and National Children's Award. He said how over 10 million children have contributed to Mann Ki Baat through postcards. He also wrote about how jawans have written letters to the PM about the new memorial. He also mentioned Atmanirbhar Bharat and Vocal for Local.
86	2022	27 February	
PM Modi talked about National Science Day and scientific temper, the role of daughters, ayurveda, lip-syncing videos and how idols have been brought back to India from various countries.
87	2022	27 March	
Various topics were covered such as India achieving $400 billion in exports. This includes increasing sales of millets, leather products, handloom products, fruits and vegetables, black rice from all around the country. How 1 lakh crore of goods have been bought through the Government e Marketplace. He mentioned the growth of the Ayush industry. He also praised cleanliness workers.
88	2022	24 April	
The Prime Minister's Museum was opened to the public. Mention of 75th Anniversary of Indian Independence was made. The PM asked short museum related questions as part of a quiz for his listeners. Questions related to museums such as the Railway Museum and a Kite Museum were asked. Topics such as a cashless economy, Divyangs, water, maths and Vedic maths were covered.
89	2022	29 May	
PM Modi praised the number of unicorns in India and how startup culture has pervaded to the grassroot and rural level. He also mentioned the importance of mentorship. He covered topics such as how the Thanjavur doll has got a GI tag and how a professor translated the Indian Constitution into Santhali language. The PM again mentioned the importance of cleanliness, this time at holy places.
90	2022	26 June	
Topics covered included Khelo India Youth Games, 200 crore COVID-19 vaccinations, 'Waste to Wealth', Neeraj Chopra and Mithali Raj, Emergency and India's space sector.
91	2022	31 July	
PM Modi began by talking about the 75th Independence Day, the martyrdom of Udham Singh, Azadi Ka Amrit Mahotsav, the role of the Indian Railways in the independence movement, including Gomoh Junction and Kakori Railway Station, and how 75 such railway stations have been identified, the 'Har Ghar Tiranga' movement of flying the tricolour in every home, and the birth anniversary of Pingali Venkaiah, who designed the flag. He also talked about beekeeping and festivals.
92	2022	28 August	
Citizen movements such as cleanliness campaign and the vaccination campaign and now the flag campaign. Importance of water and water conservation, Amrit Sarovar campaign, malnutrition, millets were made. A number of special mentions were also made.
93	2022	25 September	
PM Modi talked about the return of cheetahs to India. He mentioned Pandit Deen Dayal Upadhyay and Indian philosophy. Chandigarh airport will be named after Bhagat Singh. How the anniversary of the surgical strikes is coming. Yoga, climate change, and use of polythene were special mentions.
94	2022	30 October	
PM Modi greeted people on the occasion of Chhath and Kartik Purnima. He talked about solar energy and India's first solar powered village. He talked about ISRO and startups in the space sector. PM Modi also paid tributes to Birsa Munda. On the occasion of National Unity Day, 'Run for Unity' is being organized across the country.
95	2022	27 November	
PM Modi wished the people a number of festivals and celebrations. He mentioned how getting India has got the G20 presidency. Special mention was made to how the number of patents has increased by 31 per cent, a Sanskrit Utsav in Saudi Arabia, digital transactions, the Constitution and amendments, and 26/11 Mumbai terror attack.
96	2022	25 December	
PM Modi wished Christmas. He remembered Atal Bihari Vajpayee's birth anniversary. He mentioned the good work being done by Tata Memorial Centre. He mentioned that the next disease which needs eradicating is Kala-Azar. He mentioned how Namami Gange has got UN recognition. He gave special mention to Sange Sherpa for high altitude conservation. Other special mentions were made to a Kalarippayattu record in Dubai, Swachh Bharat and Kala Chetana's effort to revive art and culture in Karnataka.

==== List of episodes in 2023 ====
No.	Year	Date	Ref.
97	2023	29 January	
PM Modi said that a number of aspects of the Republic Day parade were praised. This included women camel riders and the first women CRPF contingent. He gave special mention to millets were mentioned, a book titled 'The Mother of Democracy', e-waste and how it can become a part of a circular economy. Mention of a competition being held for the 100th episode with regard to creating logos and jingles.
98	2023	26 February	
PM Modi mentioned the immense participation in the three competitions 'Geet' - Patriotic Songs, 'Lullabies' and 'Rangoli'. He talked about tele-consultations in the medical field and had a conversation with a doctor. Special mention was made of Tribeni Kumbho Mohotshav, a practice started after 700 years, Tribeni in West Bengal and the clean India movement.
99	2023	26 March	
Organ donations were talked about. The upcoming 100th episode was mentioned. Special mention was made of Asia's first female loco pilot and Vande Bharat Express pilot. Other special mentions were made such as 'The Elephant Whisperers'.
100	2023	30 April	
PM Modi recalled the journey of Mann Ki Baat from the first to the hundredth episode. The PM recalled Selfie with Daughter campaign. He also talked to a number of listeners. Audio of DG UNESCO was also played celebrating the occasion.
101	2023	28 May	
PM Modi mentioned how people from different time zones listened to the last 100th episode. He speaks to two listeners. He spoke about his visit to Japan, Yuva Sangam, Museo Camera museum, the Indian Memory Project and 75 Amrit sarovars. He remembered Veer Savarkar.
102	2023	18 June	
The episode was held a week early due to a scheduled trip to United States of America. PM Modi talked about Cyclone Biparjoy. He mentioned 'Catch the Rain' campaign. He talked about Shivaji and his management skills. He appealed to people to join Yoga Day and mentioned and remembered the Emergency.
103	2023	30 July	
PM Modi spoke about the monsoons and relief work with regard to floods. He also talked about water conservation and the construction of thousands of Amrit Sarovars. He also talked about how 4000 females went to Haj without a male companion. He also talked about the issue of drugs.
104	2023	27 August	
PM Modi began with one of his poems. He talked about Chandrayaan, G20, World University Games, World Sanskrit Day, how someone has put Meghalaya on the world World Cave Map, and dairies.
105	2023	24 September	
PM Modi mentioned Chandrayaan-3, G-20, and India-Middle East-Europe Economic corridor, reading and urged people to buy Made in India goods.
106	2023	29 October	
The PM praised Para Asian Games and Special Olympics World Summer Games winners. He remembered tribal warriors and talked about record khadi sales. He remembered Mirabai.
107	2023	26 November	
PM Modi greets listeners on Constitution Day, Guru Nanak Jayanti, and Kartik Purnima. He talks about water security, make in India, vocal for local during the wedding season, and pays tribute to 2008 Mumbai attack martyrs. He asks people to continue using UPI.
108	2023	31 December	
PM Modi calls out the public participation. He mentioned the themes of 'Viksit Bharat', self-reliance and vocal for local, International Year of Millets. Audio messages from Sadhguru Jaggi Vasudev was also played as well as Harmanpreet Kaur and Vishwanathan Anand and Akshay Kumar.

==== List of episodes in 2024 ====
No.	Year	Date	Ref.
109	2024	28 January	
PM Modi mentioned Ram and Ram Temple, women power during the Republic Day parade, Arjuna Award ceremony, Padma awardees, National Voters Day, birth anniversary of Lala Lajpat Rai and Khelo India Youth Games.
110	2024	25 February	
PM Modi covers women in agriculture, people's first vote, harnessing technology for wildlife conservation, the first National Creators Award, and sustainability. Mann Ki Baat will stop for next three months in light of the general elections.

=== Season 3 (2024–present) ===
==== List of episodes in 2024 ====
No.	Year	Date	Ref.
111	2024	30 June	
112	2024	28 July	
113	2024	25 August	
114	2024	29 September	
115	2024	27 October	
116	2024	24 November	
117	2024	29 December	

==== List of episodes in 2025 ====
No.	Year	Date	Ref.
118	2025	26 January	
119	2025	23 February	
120	2025	23 March	
121	2025	27 April	
122	2025	25 May	
123	2025	29 June	
124	2025	27 July	
125	2025	31 August	
126	2025	28 September	
127	2025	26 October	
128	2025	30 November	
129	2025	28 December	

==== List of episodes in 2026 ====
No.	Year	Date	Ref.
130	2026	25 January	
131	2026	22 February	
132	2026	29 March	
133	2026	26 April	
134	2026	31 May	
135	2026	28 June	
136	2026	26 July	
137	2026	30 August	
