= Mahesh Sharma (social activist) =

Indian activist

- Born: Datia district, India
- Other names: Gandhi of Jhabua
- Organization: Shivganga Samagra Gram Vikas Parishad
- Known for: Social activism, water conservation, revival of tribal tradition, sustainable development in tribal areas
- Awards: Padma Shri (2019)

Mahesh Sharma is an Indian social activist and conservationist known for his work in sustainable development and tribal tradition revival in the Jhabua district of Madhya Pradesh. He has been referred to as the "Gandhi of Jhabua". In 2019, the Indian government awarded him the Padma Shri, the fourth-highest civilian honour in India. He is the founder of Shivganga, a non-governmental organisation.

== Early life ==
He was born in Ghughsi village of Datia district. Mahesh attended a government school near Pitambara Peeth. He participated in the student council during his school years. After completing his intermediate studies, Mahesh pursued a graduation degree in Gwalior. His family's financial situation improved around this time, allowing him to rent a room in Gwalior for ₹7 per month. He is the third of six brothers. He joined the Rashtriya Swayamsevak Sangh (RSS), a Hindu nationalist volunteer organization, to engage in social service.

== Work ==
He has been associated with RRS as its Pracharak and served as the organization minister of Saraswati Vidya Pratisthan. In 1998, he became the General Secretary of the Forest Residents Welfare Council in Jhabua, Madhya Pradesh. Since then, he has been involved in public welfare and awareness campaigns in the region. He started the Shivganga Abhiyan through Halma, a public participation project that has resulted in the construction of over 111,000 water structures and widespread tree planting. Halma is an ancient tradition of the Bhil tribes where people gather to help community members who are facing problems. These initiatives have reportedly increased groundwater levels and improved the agricultural productivity of drought-stricken villages. He constructed more than 5,000 small and large water structures in 350 villages.

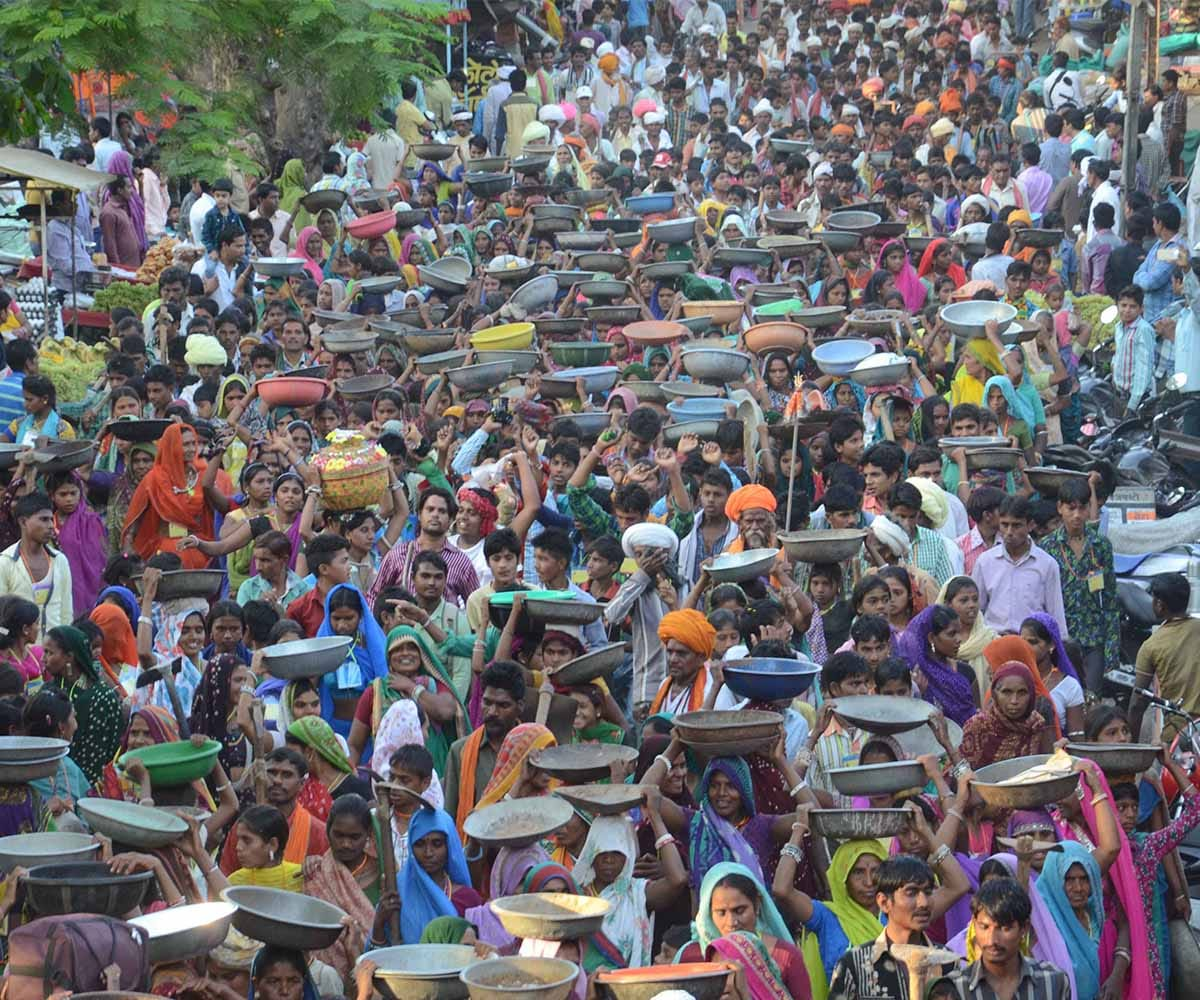
Sharma's organization, Shivganga, has been organizing a large-scale Halma at Hathipava Hills in Jhabua since 2009, which is participated by over 10,000 villagers

His construction of 73 ponds over 12 years significantly reduced water scarcity and addressed related issues in 700 villages.

He established Shivganga Samagra Gram Vikas Parishad based in Jhabua, which an outfit engaged in building water harvesting structures and check dams in tribal areas. The organization is primarily active in the Jhabua, Dhar, and Alirajpur districts of Madhya Pradesh.

== See also ==
- Rajendra Singh
- Uma Shankar Pandey
- Laxman Singh (conservationist)
