= Ramveer Tanwar =

Indian activist

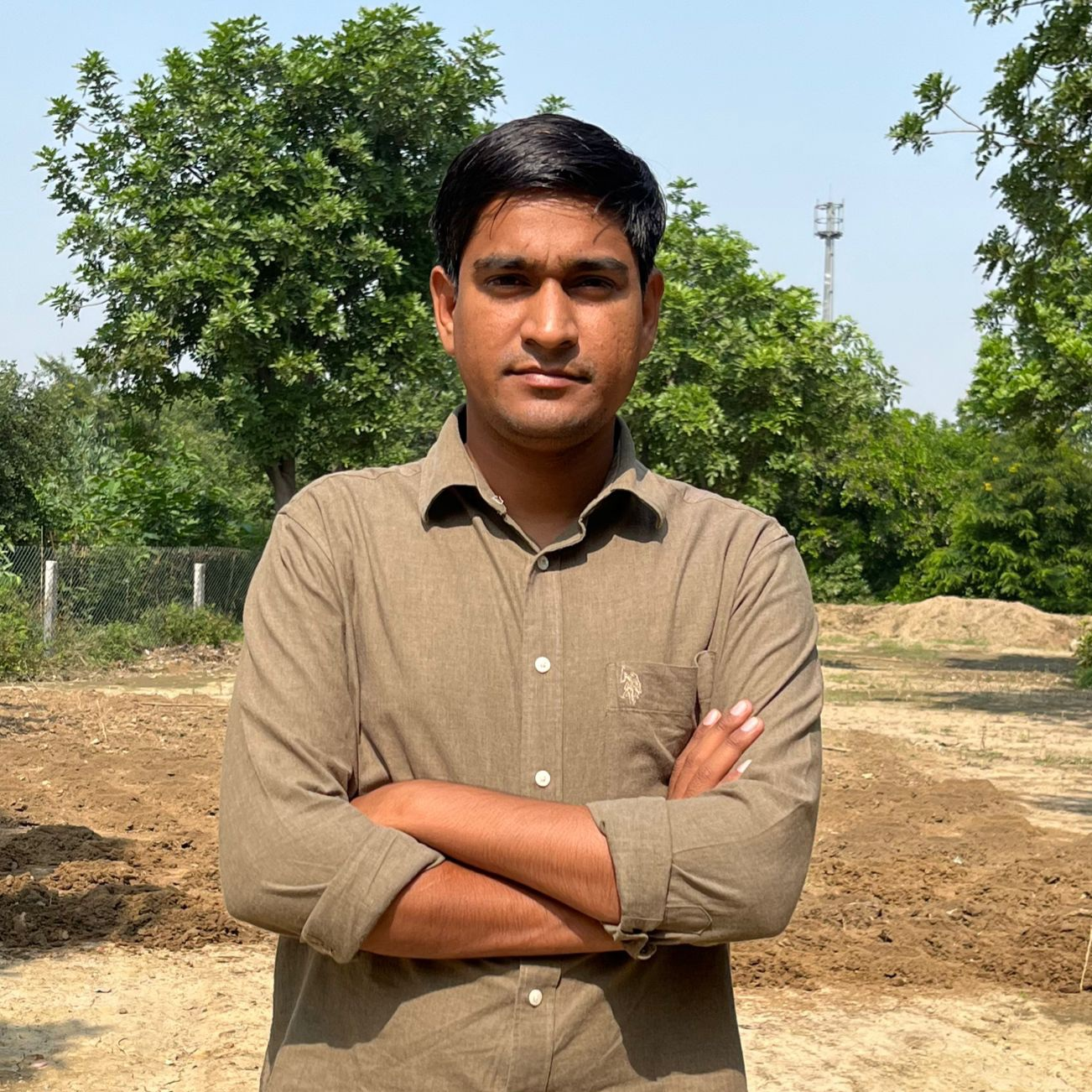
- Ramveer Tanwar
- Born: Gautam Buddha Nagar district, Uttar Pradesh, India
- Other name: Pond Man of India
- Education: BTech
- Alma mater: KCC Institute of Technology and Management
- Occupations: Social activist, environmentalist, social worker
- Organization: Say Earth
- Known for: Water conservation, pond beautification, revival of water bodies, and developing urban forest
- Awards: Karmaveer Chakra Award (2019)

Ramveer Tanwar is an Indian social activist and water conservationist known for his work in water conservation, pond beautification, the revival of water bodies, and the developing of urban forests across India. He has contributed to cleaning and restoring approximately 80 ponds across states such as Uttar Pradesh, Uttarakhand, Haryana, Madhya Pradesh, Delhi, Gujarat, and Karnataka. He is often referred to as the 'Pond Man of India'.

Tanwar is the founder of the social organization, Say Earth and the 'Jal Chaupal' campaign, focused on the revival of water bodies and promoting environmental awareness. He serves as the brand ambassador for the Swachh Bharat Mission, appointed by Ghaziabad Municipal Corporation and holds the position of Ghaziabad district coordinator for the Ground Water Force under the Government of Uttar Pradesh.

== Early life and education ==
Ramveer Tanwar was born in Dadha village in the Gautam Buddha Nagar district of Uttar Pradesh. He is the youngest of five siblings. He received his primary education in his village. In 2014, Tanwar graduated from KCC Institute of Technology and Management with a bachelor's degree in Mechanical engineering.

After graduating, Tanwar worked as an engineer briefly before committing to full-time environmental and water conservation work. He received groundwater conservation training from the Central Pollution Control Board of the Ministry of Environment, Forest and Climate Change.

== Work ==
In 2015, Tanwar launched the 'Jal Chaupal' campaign to conserve water and revive water bodies, starting in Dadha village. He expanded the initiative to raise awareness on water conservation in rural areas of Uttar Pradesh, including Dabra, Kulipura, Chauganpur, Sirsa, Rampur, and Salempur. Initially focused on awareness, Tanwar later engaged in removing illegal encroachments, beautifying, and reviving ponds.

By 2021, Ramveer had revived about 40 ponds, including Gautam Buddha Nagar, Ghaziabad, Saharanpur, Palwal, Manesar, and Delhi. By 2023, Ramveer Tanwar has completed the cleaning and renovation of about 80 ponds in Uttar Pradesh, Uttarakhand, Haryana, Madhya Pradesh, Delhi, and Gujarat.

In 2018, he launched the 'Selfie with Pond' initiative to actively involve the youth. Under this campaign, young individuals began capturing selfies with ponds and sharing them on social media. To specify the locations, participants were encouraged to include the pond's name. The initiative garnered widespread attention, as the images of cleaned water bodies served as inspiration, and motivated local officials to clean them. The campaign also received support from individuals of Indian origin residing abroad, as well as citizens from the United States, Canada, and Indonesia.

In 2020, Ramveer Tanwar founded the non-profit, Say Earth, which is engaged in its ongoing pond cleaning efforts. Major contributors include NGOs like HCL foundation, Green Yatra, and Sleep Well Foundation.

Tanwar is currently creating several urban forests using Japan's Miyawaki method. In this process, he converts barren land allotted by the government into fertile land and then plants trees to conserve urban land, protect soil quality, and reduce air and land pollution.

=== Mann Ki Baat ===
In the 24 October 2021 broadcast of the radio program Mann Ki Baat on All India Radio, Prime Minister Narendra Modi commended Ramveer Tanwar for his outstanding work in cleaning and conserving ponds.

In the 100th episode of the Mann Ki Baat program in April 2023, Ramveer Tanwar was selected as one of the 100 guests nationwide. During the five-day program, he participated in the National Conclave at Vigyan Bhawan, New Delhi, on 26 April 2023. Activities included a visit to the Rajpath at Rashtrapati Bhavan and the Pradhanmantri Sangrahalaya on 27 April, followed by a yoga session, a tour of the Red Fort, and Rajghat on 28 April 2023. On 30 April 2023, Ramveer attended a Mann Ki Baat session with Governor Anandiben Patel at Raj Bhavan in Lucknow.

=== Jal Choupal ===
Jal Chaupal is an initiative launched by Ramveer in 2015 to raise awareness about water scarcity and related factors. It serves as a platform for discussions on topics like groundwater, drainage, water pollution, rainwater harvesting, and water budgeting.

== In popular culture ==
His life story was featured in Volume 4 of the Ministry of Culture's comic book Mann Ki Baat, published by Amar Chitra Katha in July 2023. In 2022, on World Environment Day, National Geographic, as part of its 'One for Change' initiative, showcased a series of short films featuring social activists, including Ramveer Tanwar, who has worked to make the world a better place. The series was also broadcast on Disney+ Hotstar.

== Awards and recognition ==
- Ramveer was awarded the Shining World Protection Award from Taiwan, which also provided a grant of US$10,000.
- In 2019, he was awarded the Rex Karmaveer Chakra Award, a global civilian honor by the United Nations and iCONGO.
- In September 2022, Ghaziabad Municipal Corporation appointed Ramveer Tanwar as the brand ambassador for the Government of India's campaign, Swachh Bharat Mission.
- In May 2022, Tanwar received the Wetland Champions 2022 award from the Ministry of Environment, Forest and Climate Change (MoEFCC), presented by Union Minister Bhupender Yadav and Minister of State Ashwini Kumar Choubey.
- In July 2022, he was honored with the State Ground Water Award by the Uttar Pradesh Government for his contribution to water conservation.
- He was awarded the Water Hero Award by the Ministry of Jal Shakti.

== See also ==
- Rajendra Singh
- Sunil Jaglan
- Uma Shankar Pandey
- Laxman Singh (conservationist)
- Anand Malligavad
