= Ripu Daman Bevli =

Indian athlete and activist

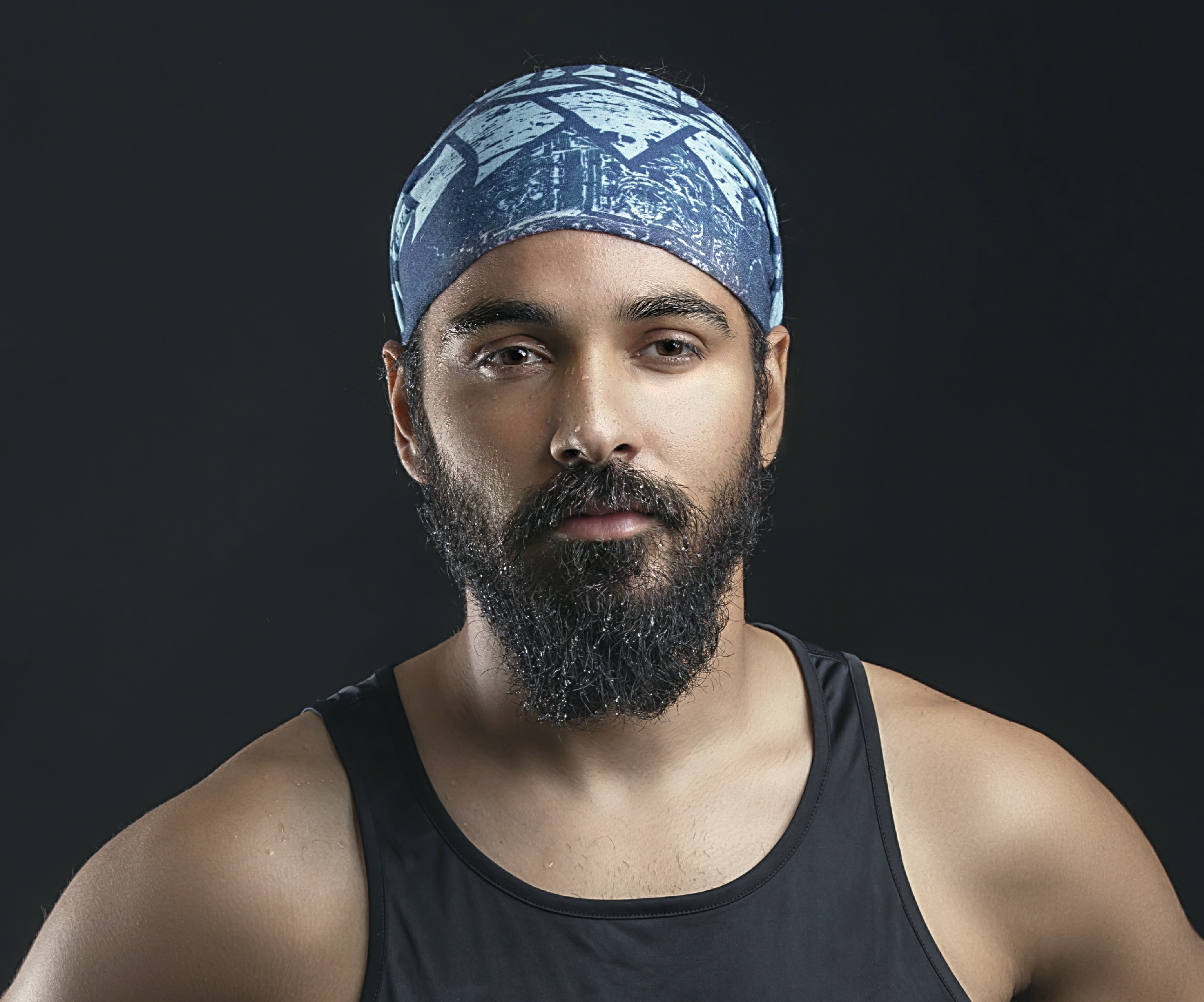
- Born: 15 November 1987 (age 38); New Delhi, India
- Other name: Plogman of India
- Occupations: Social activist and environmentalist
- Title: FIT India Ambassador
- Movement: Litter Free India
- Awards: Social Media Activist of the Year 2020; Earth Day Network Star (2021)

Ripu Daman Bevli (born 15 November 1987) is an environmentalist, and social activist. He has been referred as the Plogman of India for his contributions to the littering crisis in India and for introducing the concept of plogging to India. He is one of the ambassadors of FIT India Movement.

== Early life ==
He started his career with information technology companies including HCL Infosystems and Akamai Technologies before moving into a sales role for the startup PacketZoom.

== Activism ==
In 2017, he started the Ploggers of India movement and quit his job in 2018. The initiative was named initially as My city, My responsibility but later was changed to Ploggers of India. His initial activities involved raising awareness about littering within the runners community and later he started to spread awareness about cleanliness, plogging and its requirements at schools and other institutions in collaboration with NGOs, under the Litter Free India movement, which combines the FIT India movement and Swachh Bharat missions. In September 2019, he was invited to 57th episode of "Mann Ki Baat", the radio program of Prime Minister Narendra Modi. In the latter half of 2019, he started a campaign Run to Make India Litter Free in collaboration with R|Elan where he executed clean up operations while running 1000 km across 50 cities of India, in September and October, 2019. The campaign's grand finale was attended by Kiren Rijiju at Jawaharlal Nehru Stadium, New Delhi on 5 December 2019.

In September 2020, Bevli was selected as one of the first 100 Global Impact Citizens by Global Impact Network, USA. In March 2021, he has been awarded the Social Media Activist of The Year 2020 by Cosmopolitan. In the same month, Bevli was declared as the Earth Day Network Star by Earthday.org. Bevli has been mentioned for his works in '25 Best Never Rest Stories' by Mercedes Benz India and '5 Eco-Warriors Conquering Climate Change in India' by the Oxygen project. During the COVID-19 pandemic in 2020, Bevli initiated the "Plastic Upvaas" campaign to spread awareness about requirement of usage of reusable fabric masks instead of surgical masks to finally minimize the plastic usage.
