= Kurella Vittalacharya =

Indian educator

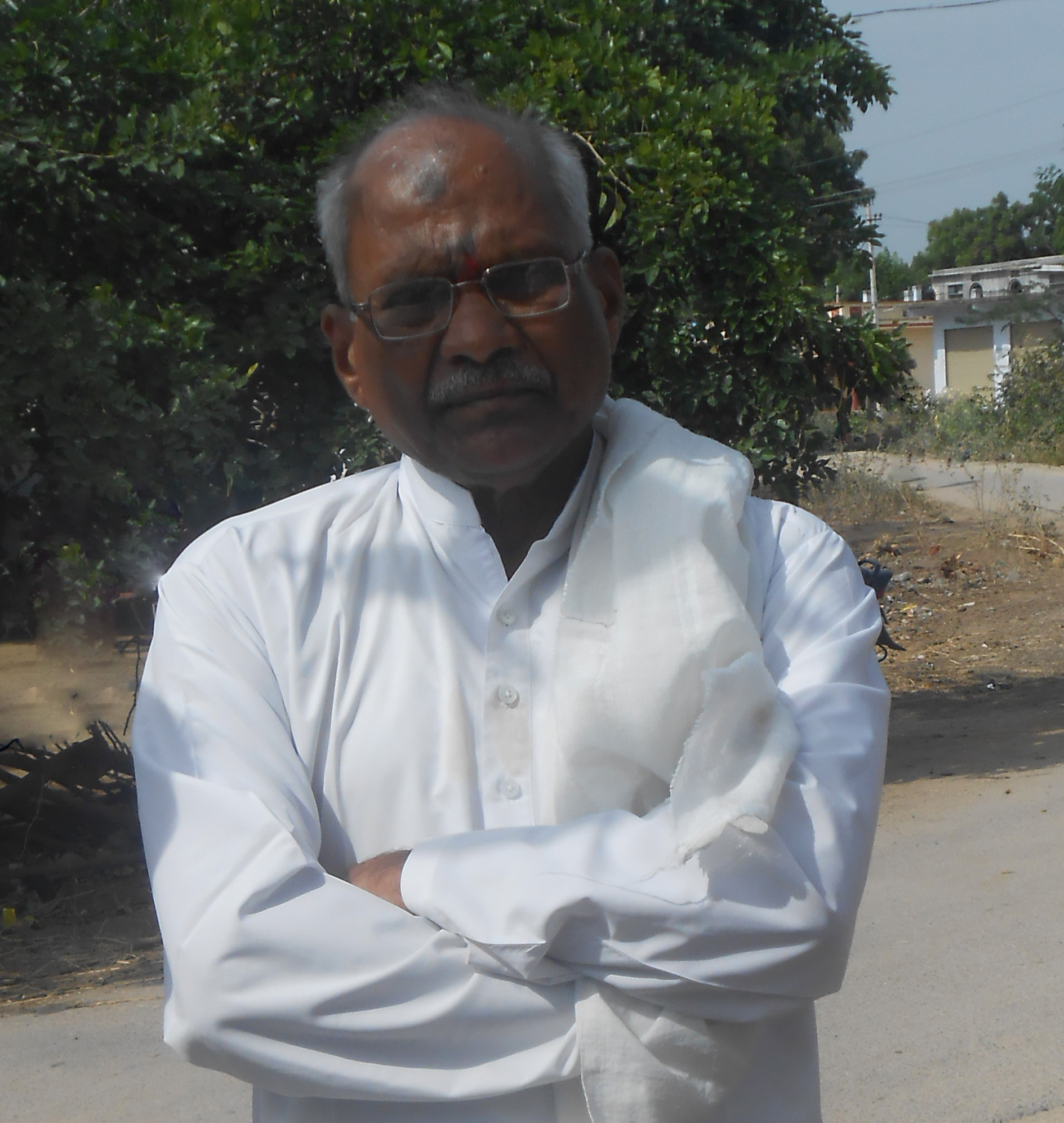
- Born: 1938 (age 87–88)
- Occupations: Educator, Poet, Author
- Known for: Contributions to Telugu literature and education
- Notable work: 'Vittaleshwara Satakam'
- Awards: Telugu University Distinguished Award, Dasarathi Award Padma Shri

Kurella Vittalacharya (born 1938) is an Indian educator, poet, and author who has contributed to Telugu literature. His work was recognised with the Padma Shri in 2024.

== Early life and career ==
Vittalacharya was born into a family that faced financial challenges after the death of his father. He pursued his literary education with the help of community support.

Vittalacharya has served as a principal and lecturer, and has written 22 books, including the poetry collection 'Vittaleshwara Satakam'. His contributions have earned him accolades including the Telugu University Distinguished Award and the Dasarathi Award in 2019, which was presented by then Vice-President Venkaiah Naidu.

Vittalacharya established a public library in his hometown which has 200,000 books. This has led to the development of additional libraries in surrounding areas.

== Honors ==
His efforts have been nationally recognized, receiving praise from Prime Minister Narendra Modi during the 'Mann Ki Baat' radio program. On January 25, 2024, the Government of India awarded him the Padma Shri for his extensive contributions to the fields of literature and education.
