= Tanwar (surname) =

Tanwar is a surname in Hindustani language. Alternative spellings include Tawar and Tanvar.

== Notable people ==
- Kanwar Singh Tanwar, Indian politician
- Brahm Singh Tanwar, Indian politician
- Kartar Singh Tanwar, Indian politician
- Karan Singh Tanwar, Indian politician
- Ramveer Tanwar, Indian social activist
- Sakshi Tanwar, Indian actress
- Satpal Tanwar, Indian social activist
