= Plogging =

Picking up litter while jogging

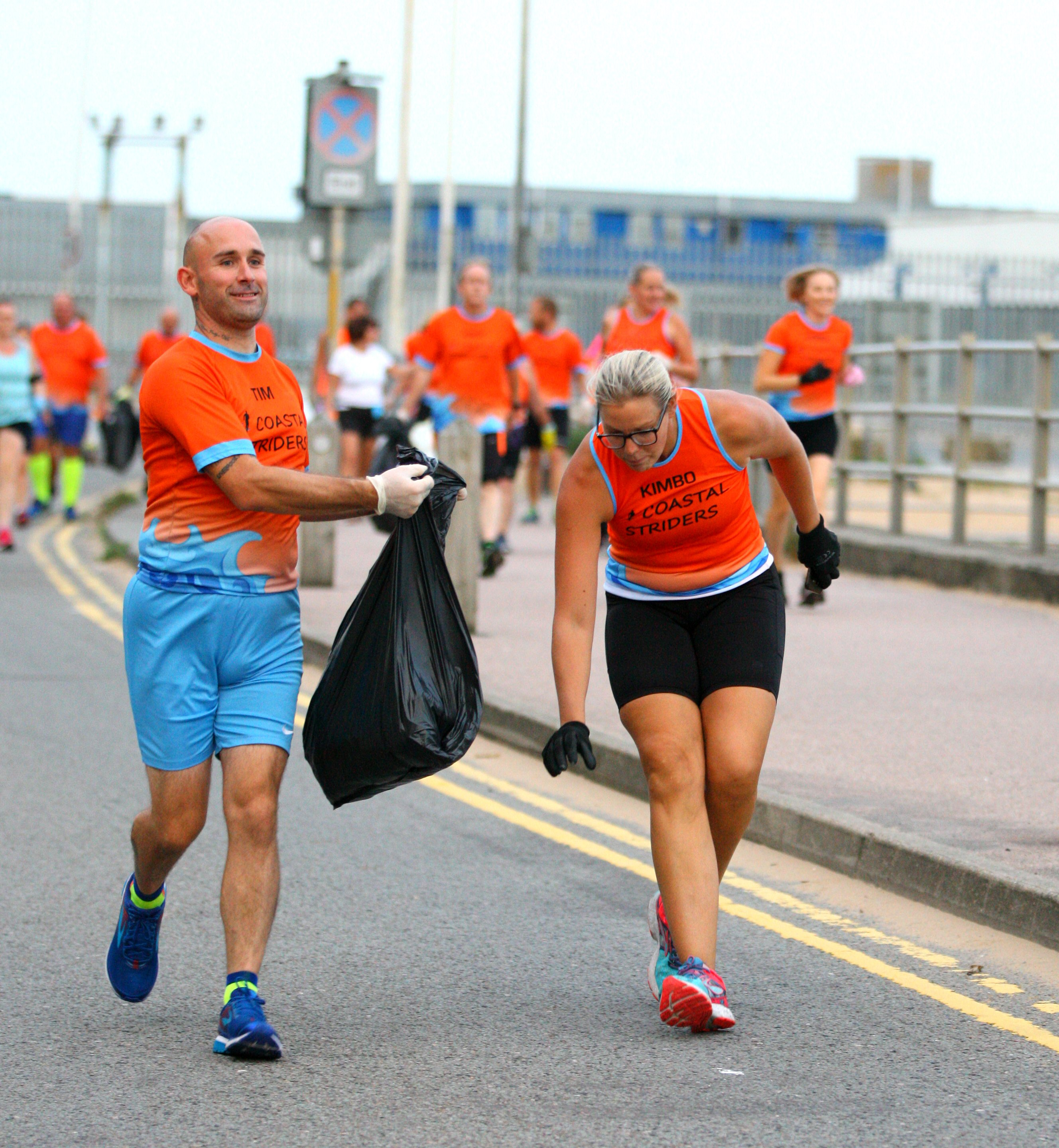
A woman picks up litter, while a man jogs alongside, with a garbage bag, at a plogging event in Kent, England

Plogging is the activity of picking up litter while jogging. It started as an organized activity in Sweden around 2016 (the first part of the name deriving from the Swedish verb plocka upp, to pick up) and spread to other countries in 2018, following increased concern about plastic pollution. As a workout, it provides variation in body movements by adding bending, squatting and stretching to the main action of running, hiking, or walking. An estimated two million people plog daily in 100 countries and some plogging events have attracted over three million participants.

Similar to plogging, pliking is a combination of picking up litter with hiking or biking, and plalking is picking up litter while walking.

== Examples and initiatives ==
Erik Ahlström started plogging in the Swedish capital city, Stockholm, when he moved there from the Åre ski resort. He created the website Plogga to organise the activity and encourage volunteers.

Author David Sedaris combines litter picking with exercise in the Parham, Coldwaltham and Storrington districts of West Sussex, taking up to 60,000 steps a day in pursuit of local rubbish. He was so effective in keeping his neighbourhood clean that the local authority named a waste vehicle in his honour.

The Keep America Beautiful organisation is now promoting plogging to its affiliates and has found that some already combined exercise with clean up, such as the Trashercize program in Tennessee. In New York, a Meetup group, Plogging NYC, had about 100 members in 2018, with events in four boroughs. In Indianapolis in 2018, a Summer of Plogging was organised by the November Project and the local affiliate of Keep America Beautiful.

Ripu Daman Bevli, introduced the concept of plogging in India. He commenced Litter Free India movement, which combines Swachh Bharat and FIT India missions. Till March 2021, Bevli has organized more than 500 cleanups across 80 cities under the Litter Free India movement, which has seen a participation of close to 10 million people. The Indian Prime Minister, Narendra Modi, has plogged to lead by example for his Swachh Bharat Mission to clean up India.

== Benefits ==
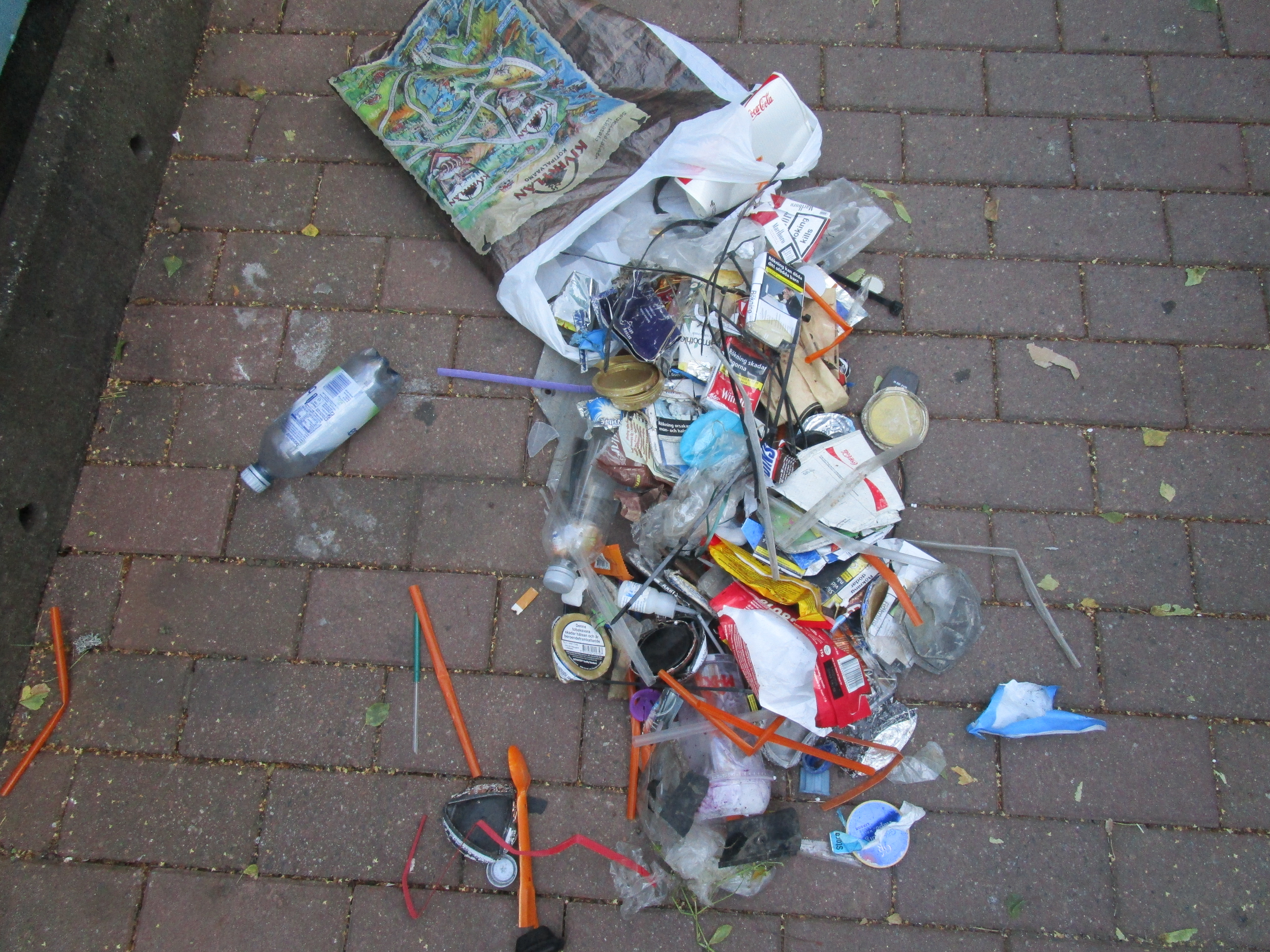
The result of one hour of plogging in Gothenburg (Sweden) on July 11, 2019.

A scientific study from 2022 found that plogging and jogging are comparable in terms of energy expenditure, but that the proportion of energy coming from fat is significantly higher in plogging.

== See also ==
- Clean-up (environment)
- SpoGomi – Japanese litter collecting sport
