= Laxman Singh (conservationist) =

Indian social activist and water conservationist

- Born: Lapodiya village, Jaipur, Rajasthan, India
- Occupations: Social activist, Water conservationist
- Organization: Gram Vikas Nav Yuvak Mandal Lapodiya (GVNML)
- Known for: Water conservation, Chauka system
- Awards: Padma Shri (2023); Vrikshamitra Award (1994)

Laxman Singh is an Indian social activist and water conservationist from Lapodiya village in Jaipur, Rajasthan, known for his work in water conservation and developing water conservation techniques such as Chauka, which has helped improve the livelihoods of villagers in Rajasthan. He is the founder of non-profit organisation Gram Vikas Nav Yuvak Mandal Lapodiya (GVNML). The Government of India awarded him the Padma Shri for his work in conserving water and protecting the environment.

== Life and work ==
Laxman Singh hails from a farming background. He has dedicated over four decades of his life to water conservation efforts. In 1977, at the age of 18, his journey began when he witnessed water scarcity in his village. He started restoring the village's old ponds through voluntary efforts when he saw his villagers forced to draw water from deep wells and witnessed others leaving the village for better opportunities in urban areas. Singh went on to construct numerous ponds in the village using a technique he invented known as the 'chauka system,' which helps conserve rainwater.

The Chauka system involves creating mud ridges to slow down water flow and enable percolation into the ground. The water then accumulates in interconnected ponds, allowing overflow to move to the next one. This method has made his village Laporia drought-proof. Singh has since spread the idea to over 200 other villages which has benefited more than 3.5 Lakh people.

Laxman Singh founded the Gram Vikas Nav Yuvak Mandal, an NGO to engage youth in community development. He inspired about 80 youngsters to build ponds in the village and encouraged neighbouring villages to do the same. Singh established schools in approximately 50 villages, providing free education regardless of socio-economic status. He managed these schools from 1980 to 2006, ultimately closing them when government schools were established in these areas.

He also holds a bachelor's degree in Social Work from Rajasthan University.

== Awards and recognition ==
Laxman Singh was awarded the Loknayak Jaiprakash Award in Delhi on 11 October 2022. In 2023, he was conferred with the Padma Shri, the fourth highest civilian honor of India, in recognition of his contributions to social work.

In 1991, he was honored with the Nehru Youth Award by the Nehru Yuva Kendra (NYK) Sangathan, under the Ministry of Youth Affairs and Sports, India. In 1994, he received the Indira Priyadarshini Vriksha Mitra Award from the Ministry of Environment and Forests, Government of India. In 1998, he was elected as an Ashoka Fellow.

== In popular culture ==
The 2021 documentary film, Lakshmanrekha, directed by Nandan Saxena and Kavita Bahl and produced by Public Service Broadcasting Trust and Films Division, portrays the life and work of Laxman Singh.

== See also ==
- Chauka
- GVNML
