= Namami Gange Programme =

Indian conservation mission

The Namami Gange Programme is a river management effort by the Union Government of India. The objectives of the initiative are conservation, reduction of pollution, and rejuvenation of the national Ganges River. Announced in 2014, The initiative planned for the creation of up to 200 sanctioned sewage treatment infrastructure projects, development of riverfronts, river surface cleaning, biodiversity and afforestation efforts, raising public awareness, and industrial monitoring. The improvements to municipal waste infrastructure made under this initiative are a part of India's efforts to reach Net Zero carbon emissions by 2070. In 2022, the United Nations Environment Programme named the Namami Gange initiative one of ten "World Restoration Flagship" efforts, enabling it to receive financial support from the United Nations. After several years of efforts under the programme, government agencies and the news media reported detectable improvement in water quality at some locations, but that water quality generally remained unfit for bathing due to high levels of fecal bacteria.

== History ==
The project was proposed by the Indian Government in 2014 with an original projected budget of Rs.20,000 Crore. It was approved by the Union Cabinet in May 2015. The project's planned outlay, intended to be spent over five years ending in 2020, was five times more than had been spent on similar efforts since 1985, according to a government statement. The government constituted a "National Ganga Council", led by Indian Prime Minister Narendra Modi, to oversee the programme: the organization created to carry out the effort was called the National Mission for Clean Ganga. The National Mission For Clean Ganga declared Chacha Chaudhary the mascot of the Namami Gange Programme.

In 2021, the touring exhibition, "A Clean Ganga Roadshow," inaugurated on the sidelines of COP26 in Glasgow in 2021, saw additional investment, including the formation of four chapters in Scotland, Wales, the Midlands, and London to connect various interest groups with the Namami Gange Programme. Also in 2021, over 30,000 fish eggs of economically important species, which were declining in the Ganges (such as catla, rohu, and mrigal) were released at the confluence of the Ganges and the Yamuna in Prayagraj Sangam, an effort organized by the Central Inland Fisheries Research Institute. In June 2021, data from the National Mission for Clean Ganga indicated that out of 341 projects, 147 (43%) had been completed and that out of 157 sewage projects, 61 (39%) had been completed. In January 2023, during the launch of the MV Ganga Vilas cruise, Prime Minister Narendra Modi inaugurated and laid the foundation stones for several other inland waterways projects worth more than Rs.1000 crores in a continued effort to raise awareness for the potential of the river cruise industry.

In March 2020, the government stated that it had approved 152 infrastructure projects in the Ganga basin related to improving sewage treatment, of which 46 had been completed. In July 2020, the director of the NMDC stated that it had spent half of the programme's initial allocation of Rs. 20,000 crore. He said that at the project's inception, the capacity of sewage treatment plants in towns along the Ganga was only sufficient to handle a third of sewage discharge, but that the Namani Gange program had expanded this capacity to meet approximately 2000 MLD of the necessary 3600 MLD.

Frontline, an Indian news magazine, said that by 2026, the government had approved 524 projects (including riverfront renovations and monitoring efforts in addition to sewage treatment works) of which 355 were complete.

== Reception ==
In 2022, the United Nations Environment Programme named the Namami Gange initiative one of ten "World Restoration Flagship" efforts, enabling it to receive financial support from the United Nations.

In January 2018, news media reported that the Comptroller and Auditor General of India (CAG) had "failed miserably in implementing the clean-up plan". The CAG's report to the Indian Parliament stated that between 2014 and 2017, only approximately a quarter of the funds allocated to the Namami Gange Programme had been spent (Rs.1,836.4 crore of the Rs.7,387 crore it was eligible to receive). The report also stated that between 2012-13 and 2016-17, the water quality had declined at most of the sites monitored, and remained unfit for "outdoor bathing". The report stated that levels of fecal coliform (bacteria found in human and animal fecal waste) were far higher than permissible.

According to India's Central Pollution Control Board, a governmental agency, the water quality along most of the Ganga's length in 2020 was "unfit for bathing and drinking", due in part to the level of fecal coliform. In January 2025, shortly before the Kumbh Mela, during which hundreds of millions of pilgrims bathed in the Ganges, the Central Pollution Control Board estimated fecal coliform levels at nearly 20 times the permissible level. According to Frontline, the government chose not to publicize this information to pilgrims. In 2023, Wired magazine reported that inhabitants of towns near the Ganga believed water quality had improved in recent years, but a large majority of monitoring stations still reported fecal coliform levels as "alarmingly high", and two-thirds of drains in the state still emptied into the Ganges.

Frontline reported in May 2026 that the Namani Gange programme had created detectable improvements in water quality at some monitoring stations, and had also led to increases in the population of the endangered Ganges river dolphins. However, it reported that the riverfront developments and associated projects had increased the displacement of communities whose traditional livelihoods depended on the river, including the Nishad, whose appearance in Hindu mythology had been used to generate support by Modi's party.
