= MV Ganga Vilas =

Indian motor vessel

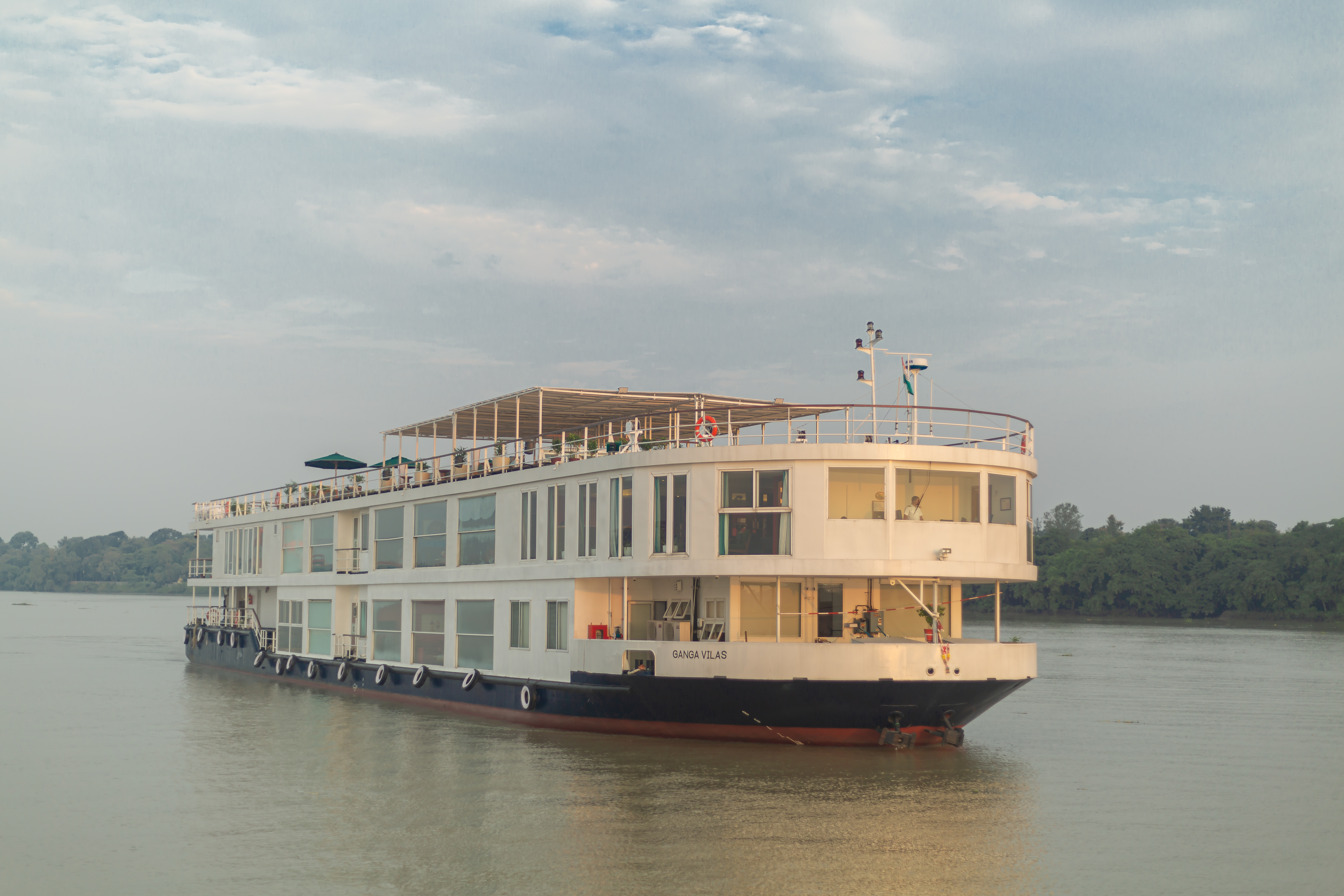
MV Ganga Vilas

MV Ganga Vilas is the world's longest Motor Vessel (MV) river cruise. it was flagged off by the Prime Minister of India, Narendra Modi, on 13 January 2023 via video conferencing, where the Chief Minister of Uttar Pradesh, Shri Yogi Adityanath, the Chief Minister of Assam, Shri Himanta Biswa Sarma, and the Union Minister of Port Shipping and Waterways, Shri Sarbananda Sonowal were also present. It is the first cruise ship made in India.

== Travel routes ==
From Varanasi in Uttar Pradesh, the MV Ganga Vilas will travel around 3,200 km in 51 days to Dibrugarh in Assam via Bangladesh, passing through 27 river systems. With a capacity of 36 tourists on board, the MV Ganga Vilas has three decks and 18 suites. For its maiden voyage, 32 tourists from Switzerland have signed up for the entire journey.

The MV Ganga Vilas cruise itinerary includes World Heritage Sites, National Parks, and River Ghats to key cities such as Patna in Bihar, Sahibganj in Jharkhand, Kolkata in West Bengal, Dhaka in Bangladesh, and Guwahati in Assam. Over fifty destinations will be visited during this 51-day itinerary.

== Technical specifications ==
Ganga Vilas is a motor vessel (MV) type cruise, there are three decks on the vessel, which are 12 meters wide and 62 meters long.

== Booking ==
As the first cruise ship made in India, the MV Ganga Vilas began its journey from Varanasi in Uttar Pradesh and reached Dibrugarh in Assam by way of Bangladesh. On the Antara Cruises website, the company that operates the Ganga Vilas cruise, tickets for a 51-day trip from Varanasi to Dibrugarh would cost Rs 12.59 lakh per person.

== Environmental impact ==
Environmentalists and conservationists fear damage to the habitat of the Ganges river dolphin (Platanista gangetica) as a result of the Ganga Vilas Cruise.

== See also ==
- Ship prefix
- Namami Gange Programme
