= MLD =

MLD may refer to:

== Medicine ==
- Manual lymphatic drainage
- Metachromatic leukodystrophy, a rare neurometabolic genetic condition

== Science and technology ==
- Masking Level Difference, see Auditory masking
- Mean log deviation in statistics and econometrics
- Mixed layer depth in hydrography
- Multicast Listener Discovery, in computer networking
- Million liter per day, in environmental engineering

== Other ==
- ICAO airline designator of Air Moldova
- Maldives, ITU country code
- Maniac Latin Disciples, a street gang
- Marine Luchtvaart Dienst, the Dutch Naval Aviation Service
- Mutually locally derivable, a mathematical property of aperiodic tile sets
- EU Money Laundering Directive
- Miluo East railway station, China Railway pinyin code MLD
- Moderate Learning Difficulties, a recognised form of Special Educational Needs (SEN)
- Monolingual learner's dictionary, type of dictionary designed to meet the reference needs of people learning a foreign language.
- Moreland railway station, Melbourne
