= Pariksha Pe Charcha =

Annual event on exam stress management in India from 2018

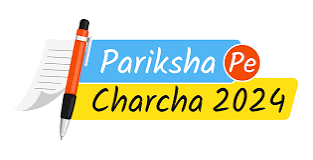

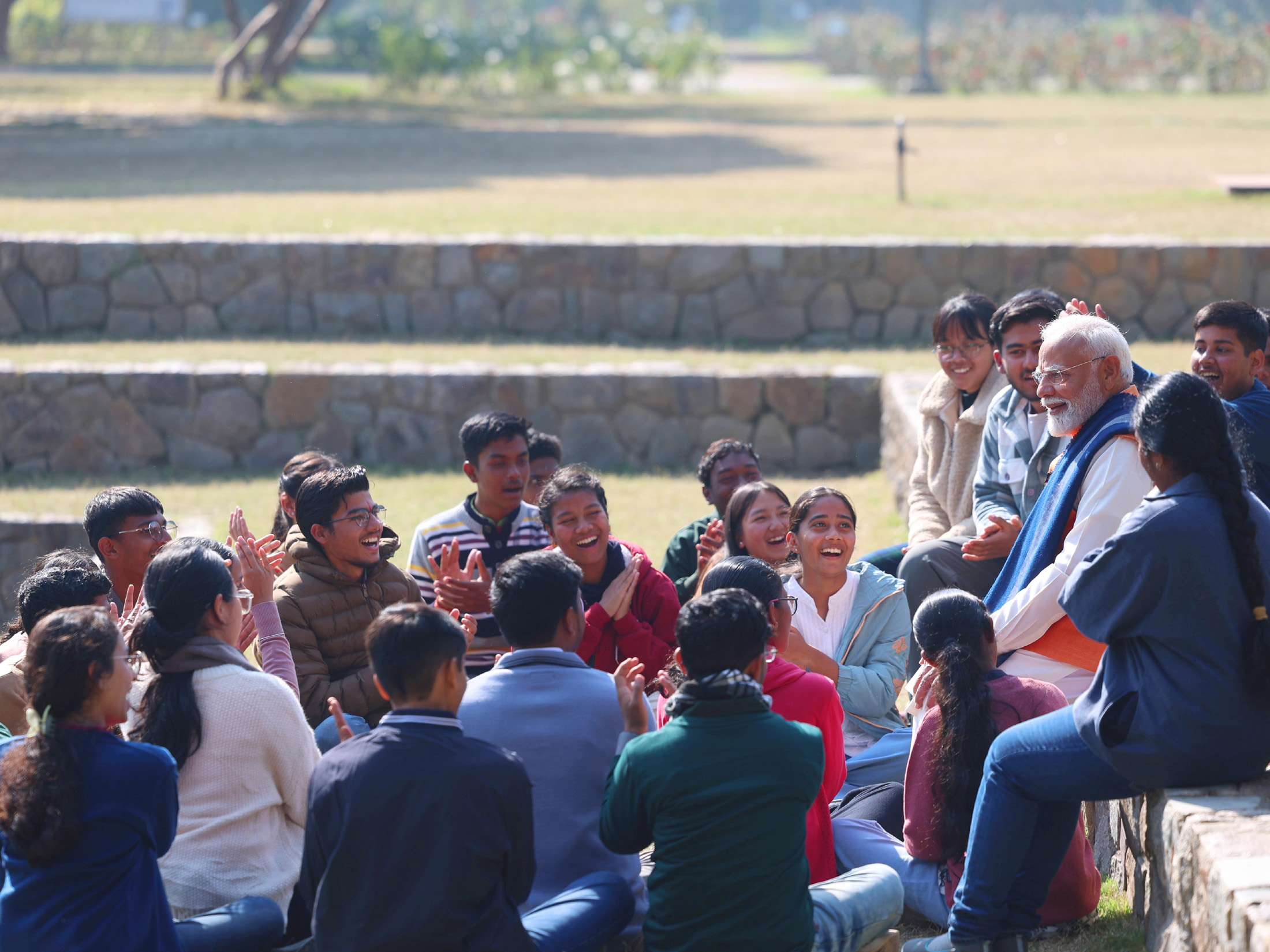
- PM Narendra Modi interacting with Children during Pariksha Pe Charcha 2025
- Nickname: PPC
- Status: Active
- Genre: Convention
- Frequency: Annually
- Venue: Bharat Mandapam
- Location: New Delhi
- Country: India
- Years active: 8
- Inaugurated: February 16, 2018
- Founder: Narendra Modi
- Most recent: February 10, 2025
- Previous event: 2025
- Next event: 2026
- Participants: Students from all across the country, selected through a competition
- Attendance: Students:- 2.02 crore Teachers:-14.93 lakh Parents:- 5.64 lakh
- Area: All India
- Major events: Discussion and counselling on exam and study related issues
- Member: Department of School Literacy, Ministry of Education

Pariksha Pe Charcha (transl. Discussion on Examination) is an annual event held every year since 2018. During the event the Prime Minister of India Narendra Modi interacts with students, teachers and parents from across the country, and shares tips on how to take board and entrance exams in a relaxed and stress free manner.

Participants for the event are generally chosen through a competition. Winners of the competition are given a chance to attend the event, and some of the winners get a chance to interact directly with the Prime Minister.

== History ==
The first edition of Pariksha pe Charcha was held on 16 February 2018; the second edition was held on 29 January 2019, in New Delhi; the third was held in 2020 and the fourth one was held on 7 April 2021 through an online meeting. The latest (7th) edition was held on 29 january 2024, In which PM Narendra Modi said

"Do not waste time watching reels, get adequate sleep".

== Viral clip ==
On 29 January 2019, the second event of PPC, a clip went viral on social media in which a boy's mother asks for help to PM Modi, for whom he replied: "Ye PUBG wala hai kya?" (Is he of PUBG?).

== Recognition ==
The 2025 annual edition of the Pariksha Pe Charcha has made into the Guinness World Records, for “Registering the Most People on a Citizen Engagement Platform in One Month”. The record was achieved during the 8th edition, with 3.53 crore valid registrations recorded on the MyGov.in platform.

== See also ==
- Exam Warriors
