= GVNML =

GVNML (Gram Vikas Navyuvak Mandal Laporiya) is an NGO working in the areas of Natural resource management, Child Rights and Reproductive Health. It is registered under the Rajasthan Society Registration Act 28 1958, FCRA, 80G and 12A, PAN, TAN and TDS. Registration Number: 489 / 85-86.

Unofficially its work began in 1977 in the village of Laporiya, which is in the Dudu block of Jaipur district, Rajasthan, India. The organisations founder Laxman Singh began work on mobilizing local communities to rebuild local rainwater collection structures that had fallen into disrepair. This community group quickly evolved into GVNML which literally means Village Development New Youth Group Laporiya, and it was registered as an NGO in 1986.

The organisation has since, amongst other works, promoted the use of a unique water harvesting technique known as the chauka system which has been used to reduce soil erosion and provide year-round fodder on communal lands for cow and goatherds.

GVNML facilitates local action by building alliances and carrying out capacity building in community-based organisations, believing that empowering villagers is the only way to sustainably develop.

== Mission ==
To work as a catalyst for grassroots development and local empowerment by assisting rural communities in the semi-arid region of Rajasthan to live with dignity by democratic principles and pursue the lifestyle of their choice.

== Approach to development ==
GVNML facilitates grassroots action, providing technical, legal and managerial support to the community. But GVNML believes that empowering villagers to cooperate is the only way to ensure sustainable development. The aim is to build alliances and carry out capacity building in Community Based Organizations to render them capable of continuing the projects without external support. Since the organization's establishment in 1977, the development approach has evolved from needs to a rights-based approach, and now many of their programmes focus on personal rights development and community development The state and national government continue to pass bills giving citizens the Right to Education, the Right to Food and the Right to Information, GVNML has a local impact in ensuring that these rights are claimed.

== Areas of intervention ==
=== Climate change adaptation ===
GVNML works in the fields of Common Property Resources, Agriculture and Water Management.

==== Common property resources ====
Animal Husbandry is one of the major sources of livelihood in Rajasthan, and regulation of pasturelands is of utmost importance. In the pre-Independence era, Rajasthan was divided into small sub-states called Riyasats and each Riyasat was considered as a unit of development work. Villagers managed common lands without external intervention. Natural Resource Management was based on mutual agreement to follow a set of unwritten norms on animal grazing, penalty to encroachers etc. Under this system, there was control over cutting trees, encroaching on common land etc. But Post Independence, this system collapsed and the pasturelands came under the control of the village Panchayats. The Panchayats usually looked upon the village common lands as a source of income and did little to regulate use of the same. This led to malpractice and degradation of the pasturelands.

GVNML initiated a programme to revive the degrading pasturelands in 1986. After much deliberation within the organisation as well as discussions with agriculture experts, GVNML decided to implement what came to be known as the chauka system. Though similar land management systems exist in Kenya, Somalia etc., the chauka system was the first of its kind to be implemented in Rajasthan.

Literally translated, chauka means ‘rectangular enclosure’. It's a small gradient enclosed by earthen bunds on three sides, which effectively traps rain water helping in recharging ground water. The ground velocity of rain water is checked in a chauka, leading to a significant reduction in soil erosion. When the water level in a chauka touches 9 inches, the rain water flows to the chauka at the immediately lower gradient. The water from the chaukas eventually drains into a channel that empties into a pond called nadi providing drinking water to the cattle.

==== Agriculture ====
Local farmers attempted to increase their produce using pesticides and chemical fertilizers. Overuse of the same led to increased cost of production and eventually lowered the productivity of the soil.

GVNML has aided farming communities in 94 villages of the Jaipur, Tonk, Dausa, Pali, Jodhpur and Barmer districts of Rajasthan in building field bunds. Most farmers in the region cannot afford to construct field bunds even though lack of bunds leads to soil erosion. Besides preventing soil erosion, field bunds also help in reducing the salinity of the soil. The organization also took up projects to construct rain water harvesting structures in various districts. Nadas are constructed to harvest rain water in large catchment areas on private land and the stored water can be used to irrigate fields further in the downstream. Nadas, ponds, Anicuts and local water bodies (talabs) are seen to increase the agricultural productivity of the land.

GVNML promotes sustainable organic farming without the use of pesticides and chemical fertilizers. The organization spreads awareness in the agricultural community about bio-compost and bio-insecticides. GVNML organizes demonstration-based training session for farmers to spread awareness on sustainable agricultural practices. Sessions have been organized on compost treatment, seed selection and treatment, weed control etc. Village Information Centers (VICs) have been established for capacitating village communities by providing required information as and when required. VICs have aided in sustainable community development of by enabling people to avail of government sponsored subsidized schemes for vermi-compost and drip irrigation.

==== Water management ====
With population increase some see mechanical farming as the only way to feed their families, regardless of the long term environmental effects.

Much of the GVNML operational area is downstream from Sambhar Salt Lake, where, unless ground water can be recharged farmers have to rely on salt water for irrigation. This water has high levels of Total Dissolved Solubles (TDS) leading to reduced soil fertility. These area specific problems are coupled with droughts leading to real challenges for sustainably managing natural resources. The community has been hit hard by the repercussions of declining agriculture. Against an average rainfall of 600 mm, Laporiya gets only 323 mm When the monsoon does come, it is essential to carry out surface water storage to establish moisture, provide drinking water for animals, domestic use and gravity flow irrigation. Most villages have a large water holding structure, or talab to use either for irrigation or recharging ground water. Village tube wells with hand pumps and open wells can only function if the recharging structures are in place. Drinking water supplies are fully dependent on ground water, and agriculture relies on it for 80% of its needs, so it must be recharged.

Without an adequate management system some families purchase power pumps to irrigate their fields from the talabs, therefore certain talabs are set aside only for recharging drinking water. These are kept clean, sanitized and undisturbed. Garbage pits have been constructed next to the talabs to ensure waste in not dumped in the talab. If a talab has been set aside for irrigation, it is ensured that the water is shared equally, by numbering each field such that everyone gets a turn. One of the main lakes created in this process for instance (Annasagar) helped the contiguous farms earn an annual revenue of INR 3.6 Million last year.

Man-made ponds (Nadas and Nadis), and anicuts are built to use ground water for irrigating surrounding fields, and can also be cultivated because of the moisture locked inside them. Nadis can store overflow water from the chauka system, used on common property resources. The Village Development Committee (VDC), guided by GVNML, carries out village level surface and ground water management, setting rules, enforcing and renewing them. Rules forbid the installation of power pumps at drinking water sources and surface water harvesting structures. In some villages the selling of ground water is banned, and private wells cannot be constructed.

=== Reproductive health ===
Maternal and Child Health conditions in rural Rajasthan are extremely poor with high mother and infant mortality rates during pregnancy and birth. Health issues exist due to illiteracy amongst women, poor sanitation, lack of health care centers, deep rooted local belief in superstition and poverty. Child marriage leads to early pregnancy which often proves fatal for mother and infant. Lack of nutrition can lead to anemia and malnourished infants. Frequent pregnancies and deliveries by untrained birth attendants add to the problem.

GVNML started working in the rural health sector in 1985. The organization focuses chiefly on awareness generation in the community on all aspects of health, nutrition, vaccination etc. In particular GVNML promotes institutional delivery to ensure safe childbirth. Training camps are regularly organised to train traditional birth attendants ( Dais) GVNML has organised health camps and formed village health groups in around 200 villages of Jaipur, Tonk, Pali and Sawaimadhopur districts with the financial aid of Catholic Relief Services, Mac-Aurther Foundation, UNICEF, Save the Children Finland and National Rural Heath Mission. A vaccination schedule is prepared for pregnant women and infants and vaccination camps are held for their benefit in accordance with the schedule. GVNML has undertaken distribution of nutrition supplements to pregnant women, lactating women and their infants. In 8 villages GVNML has set up two maternity centers run by a paramedic staff to provide treatment services and deliveries. Awareness camps on HIV/AIDS have also been held in many villages. GVNML creates awareness about Reproductive Health through discussions at village health groups, adolescent groups and women's self-help groups. Events such as Nutrition Day, World Breast Feeding Day, World Health Day and International Women’s Day are celebrated by GVNML to raise awareness towards health as well as social issues.

=== Child rights ===
Around 10-25% of the children in GVNML's operational area are engaged in child labour. Most of these children belong to the perceived ‘lower’ castes and belong to financially challenged families. Labour usually involves animal grazing, agricultural work, household work, daily wage earning, working in shops etc. In the 7-13 age group, the number of girls engaged in labour exceeds that of boys.

Other violations of child rights in rural Rajasthan include child marriage, sexual and physical abuse of children and sexual discrimination. Many families refrain from sending their children, especially girls to school.

GVNML has been working for children's rights since 1984. The organisation aims for all round development of children while ensuring they have claim to their basic rights. From 1984 to 1992 GVNML ran Gwal Bal Pathshaala, a night school for children who were engaged in animal grazing or other forms of labour during the day, and hence unable to attend school during the day. GVNML worked in the Tonk district on different schemes for children's development such as Family Upliftment Programme, Child Survival and Development Programme, Right of Children to Safe Drinking Water etc. Save the Children Finland and UNICEF Rajasthan extended their support to GVNML for the aforementioned projects. GVNML works in collaboration with the Gram Panchayat in several villages to spread awareness about the importance of birth registration.

Educational events are organized for the recreation of local children. Bal Sansad (Child Parliament), Bal Patrika (published children's magazine), Bal Mela (Child Fair) and cultural programmes by children have had local impact in helping children hone their creative skills and expanding their knowledge on many subjects. GVNML is also involved in the process of mainstreaming the students of Gwal Bal Pathshaalas (informal night schools) to Government schools. GVNML has also organised training sessions for Primary School Teachers and Instructors of Gwal Bal Pathshaalas in the villages of Jaipur and Tonk districts.
