= Uma Shankar Pandey =

Indian social worker (born 1971)

- Born: 5 February 1971 (age 54); Jakhni village, Banda district, Uttar Pradesh, India
- Occupation(s): Social worker, farmer
- Known for: Groundwater conservation, Medbandi technique
- Awards: Padma Shri (2023)

Uma Shankar Pandey (born 5 February 1971) is an Indian social worker who is known for his work and contributions to groundwater conservation. He launched the 'Khet mein Med, Med Par Ped (Trees on weirs in farms)' campaign in 2005, to conserve water by constructing bunds in the fields. He was awarded the Padma Shri by the Indian government in 2023 for his contributions to social work.

== Life and work ==
Uma Shankar Pandey led a community-driven initiative to address the water problem in the village. Without government assistance, he advocated for traditional water conservation methods, encouraging residents of Bundelkhand to construct bunds in fields to capture rainwater and plant trees along them.

In September 2020, Prime Minister Narendra Modi has also praised his campaign in the Mann Ki Baat program.

He is from Jakhni village in the Bundelkhand region, situated in the Banda district of Uttar Pradesh. In UP villages, he is referred to as the Pani Ke Pehredar (Guardian of Water).

In June 1995, he began working on water conservation in Jakhni village with the community. Pandey is known for his efforts to save water in Bundelkhand through Medbandi (bund making) technique. The Prime Minister has also called on the country to adopt Medbandi.

In 2015 and 2016, as part of the Jal Kranti Abhiyan, the Ministry of Jal Shakti, Government of India, established 1050 water villages based on the Jakhni Model developed by Umashankar Pandey. His innovative water conservation methods contributed to a notable rise in the water level in the Banda district, reaching 1 meter 34 cm. He worked on water conservation in Madhya Pradesh and Gujarat. The NITI Aayog recognized Jakhani as a successful example of traditional community-based water conservation, achieved without government support.

In April 2022, he was made a member of the Ground Water Conservation Committee of NITI Aayog, which was constituted under the chairmanship of Narendra Modi.

== Awards and recognition ==
He received the Padma Shri, the fourth-highest civilian award in India, for his contributions to social work.

In 2020, Umashankar Pandey received the Jal Yodha Samman, a national award from the Ministry of Jal Shakti, Government of India, presented by Vice President M. Venkaiah Naidu in the presence of Union Jal Shakti Minister Gajendra Singh Shekhawat. The same year brought recognition from the United Nations in the form of the Water Digester Award, presented by the Jal Shakti Minister.

In 2019, Union Jal Shakti Minister Gajendra Singh Shekhawat honored him with the Rashtriya Jal Prahari Samman. In 2015, Umashankar Pandey was awarded the Vidya Bhushan Award by the Director of the Sanskrit Research Institute.
