= Chauka =

Watering system

A Chauka system is a method for harvesting rainwater, typically employed in arid regions that experience monsoon rains. The term "Chauka" is derived from the Hindi word for "square". This system comprises square embankments with three sides featuring nine-inch walls; one side remains open to facilitate the entry of rainwater. Once a structure is filled, the overflow moves to the next Chauka, and so on. By retaining rainwater in this manner, the system helps prevent soil erosion and replenishes surface water, which in turn promotes the growth of various grasses. This process not only holds the soil together but also provides grazing areas for cattle and goats, as the Chauka system is predominantly used on common land. For optimal effectiveness, this method is combined with the planting of grass seeds and trees.

This system is widely in use in the Dudu block of Jaipur district in Rajasthan, India. Here a local village development organisation GVNML, working in the area of Natural Resource Management, has been responsible for its uptake among local villages.

== See also ==
- Rainwater harvesting
- Water conservation
- Agriculture
