= Armed Forces Flag Day =

Flag day of India, 7 December

Armed forces flag day badge

The Armed Forces Flag Day or the Flag Day of India is a day dedicated to honouring the soldiers and veterans of India's armed forces. It has been observed annually in India on December 7 since 1949.

== History ==
Immediately after India achieved independence, a need arose for the government to manage the welfare of its defence personnel. On August 28, 1949, a committee set up under the defence minister decided to observe a Flag Day annually on December 7. The idea behind observing a Flag Day was to distribute small flags to the general population and in return collect donations. Flag Day gains more significance as it considers that it is the responsibility of the civilian population of India to take care of the families and dependents of the armed forces personnel who fight for the country.

Jawaharlal Nehru, who was then Prime Minister of India, on December 7, 1954, said:

A few weeks ago, I visited Indo-China and saw our officers and men attached to the International Commission there. It gave me a thrill to see their smart bearing and the good work they were doing in that distant land. What pleased me still more was their general popularity with the people there. By their efficiency as well as their friendliness, they enhanced the reputation of India. Among them were people from all parts of India. They observed no provincial or other differences amongst themselves. I am sure my countrymen will be pleased to learn of them and would like to indicate their appreciation of these young men who serve our country both here and elsewhere so well. A way to indicate that appreciation is to contribute to the Flag Day Fund.

The flag of the Indian Armed Forces is similar to that of the United Kingdom's Ministry of Defence, first utilised in 1956, and is a common colour scheme in British-aligned territories, used by fellow Commonwealth nations including Cyprus, Kenya and Nigeria.

== Significance and purpose ==
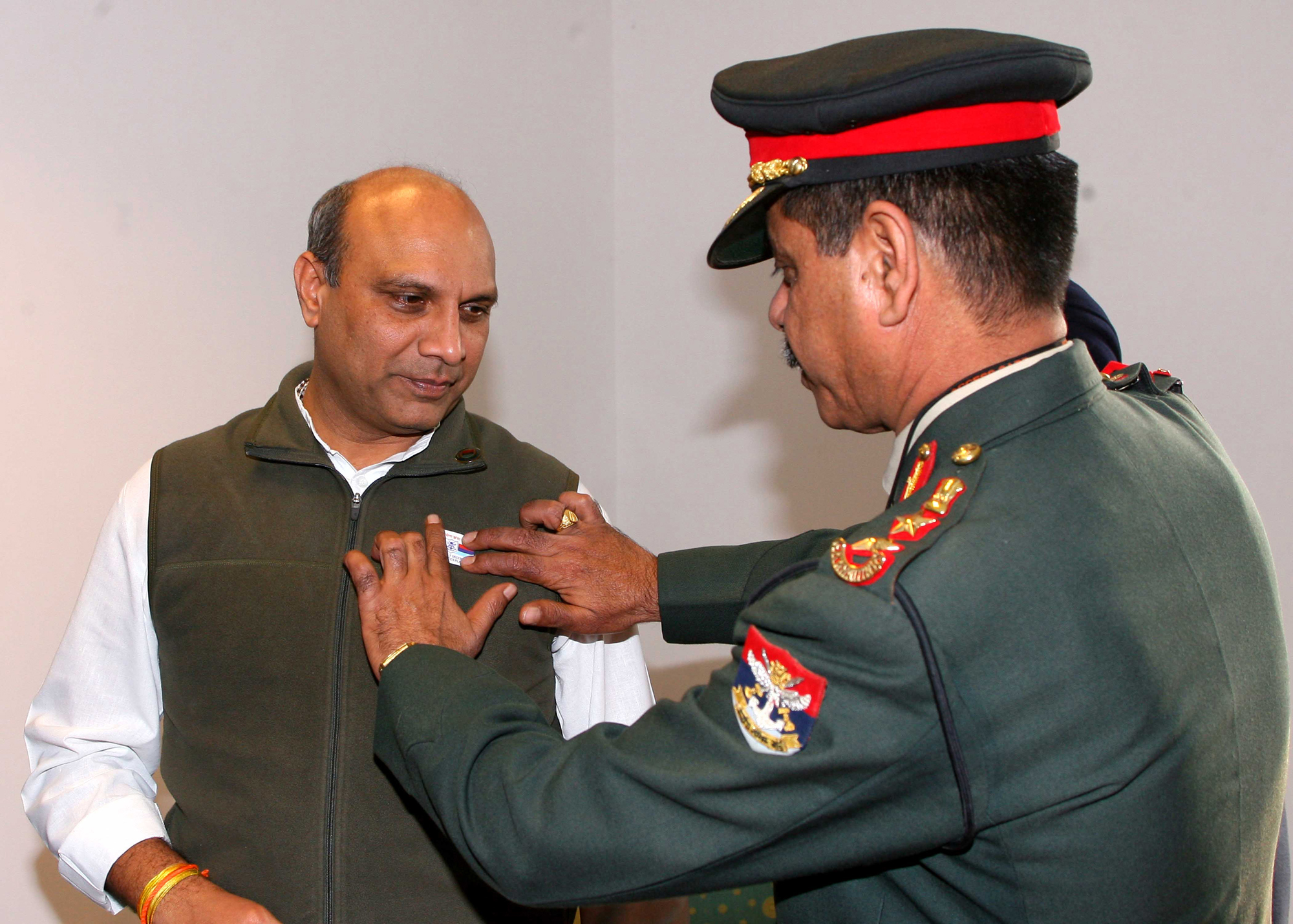
An Army Officer pinning the lapels on the Minister of State for Defence, Dr. M.M. Pallam Raju, on the occasion of Armed Forces Flag Day, in 2010

Flag Day serves to promote three basic causes:

- Rehabilitation of battle casualties
- Welfare of serving personnel and their families
- Resettlement and welfare of ex-servicemen and their families

The Armed Forces Flag Day commemoration and the collection of funds through distribution of flags. It is a time for Indians to express its gratitude and appreciation to the current and veteran military personnel of India and to acknowledge those who died in service to the country.

On the Flag Day all three branches of the Indian armed forces, the Indian Army, the Indian Air Force and the Indian Navy, arrange a variety of shows, carnivals, dramas and other entertainment programmes to showcase to the general public the efforts of their personnel to ensure national security. Throughout the country small flags and car flags in red, deep blue and light blue colours representing the three Services are distributed in return for donations.

== Flag Day Fund ==
The original Flag Day Fund was set up in 1949, by the Defence Minister's Committee. In 1993, the Defence Ministry of India consolidated related welfare funds into a single Armed Forces Flag Day fund. Those funds include,

- Amalgamated Special Fund for War Bereaved, War Disabled and other ex-Servicemen/Serving Personnel
- Flag Day Fund
- St Dunstan's (India) and Kendriya Sainik Board Fund
- Indian Gorkha Ex-Servicemen's Welfare Fund.

=== Fund collection ===
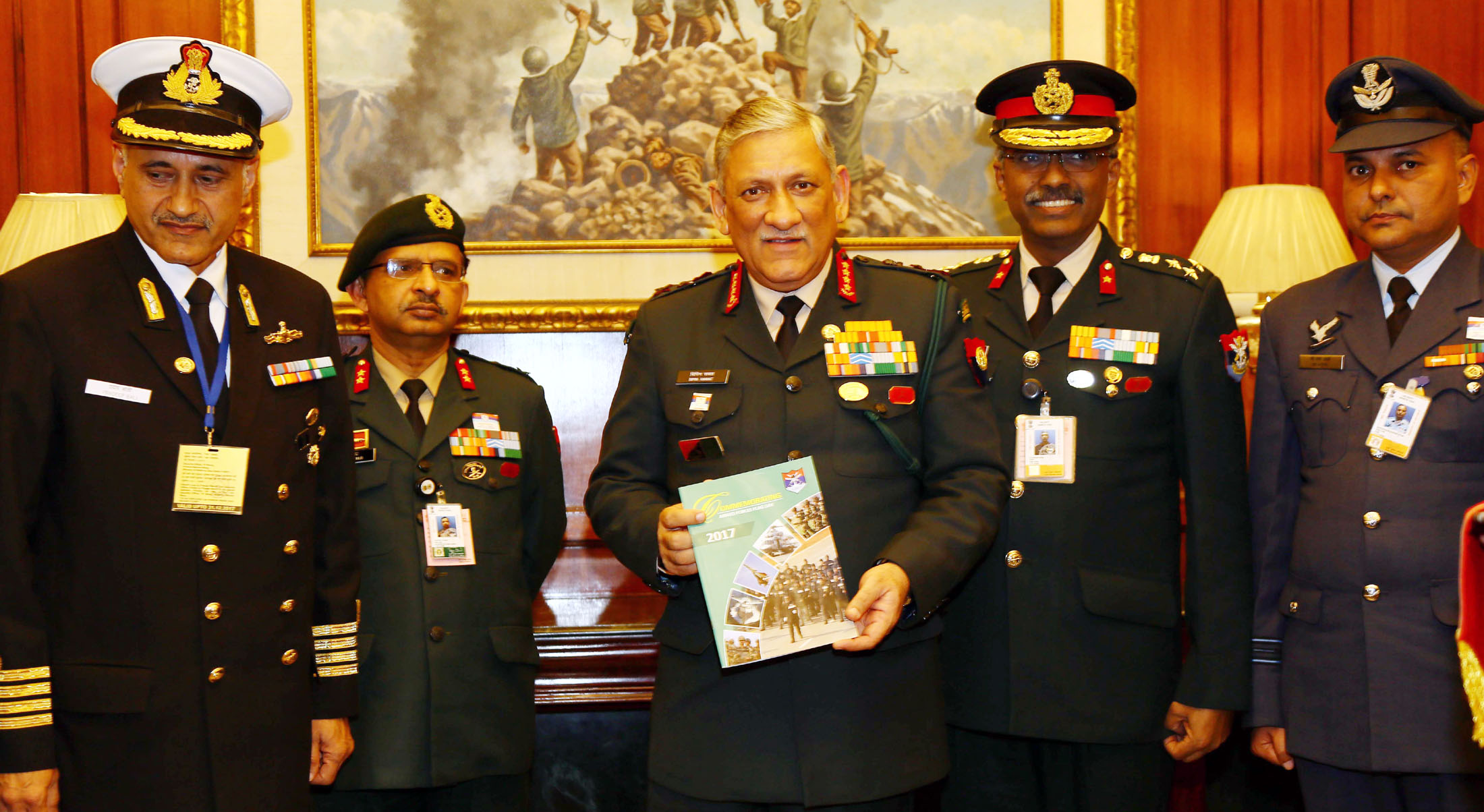
The Chief of Army Staff, General Bipin Rawat commemorating the Armed Forces Flag Day, in New Delhi on December 07, 2017

The fund collection is managed throughout the country by the local arms of the Kendriya Sainik Board (KSB), which is part of the Ministry of Defence. The collection is organised both by official and non-official means through voluntary organisations. Though welfare of the ex-servicemen and their dependents is the joint responsibility of the union government, and the governments of States and Union Territories (UTs), majority of the problems have to be resolved only by the States and UTs. Like the Kendriya Sainik Board at the centre, the Rajya / Zila Sainik Boards are responsible for policy formulation and implementation of resettlement and welfare schemes for ex-servicemen, widows and their dependents residing in their respective States / UTs / Districts. To assist the Central Government in this regard, there are 32 Rajya Sainik Boards and 392 Zila Sainik Boards in the country.

The Secretary KSB advises the Department of Sainik Welfare in the States / UTs on the policies for resettlement and welfare of ex-servicemen, widows and seeks reports from the Director, Department Sainik Welfare / Secretary RSB and Zila Sainik Welfare Officer / Secretary ZSB, on implementation of policies and success in resettling ex-servicemen, widows, disabled personnel invalidated out from the Service and their dependents. Advice is also rendered on the welfare schemes required for the clientele, which are financed from funds allotted by the Governments of States / UTs and the Amalgamated Special Funds. The Fund is operated by a Managing Committee presided over by the Defence Minister at the centre and by the executive heads of the governments in the States and Union Territories. When the Armed Forces Flag Day programme was introduced, the fund allocation was managed in such a way that the Central KSB headquarters is given only a very small share of the Flag Day Fund collections made by each state. The allotted funds for the KSB is only half a paisa per individual in the state.
