= Exam Warriors =

Book by Narendra Modi

- Author: Narendra Modi
- Translator: P. K. Narayana Pillai; V. Insuvai
- Language: English
- Genre: Academic genre
- Publisher: Penguin Books
- Publication date: 3 February 2018
- Publication place: India
- Media type: Print
- ISBN: 978-0-14-344323-0 (Hardcover)

Exam Warriors is a book by Prime Minister of India Narendra Modi which was published in 2018. Exam Warriors is written for young students to help them deal with the stress of exams. It is available in 13 languages as follows, Assamese, Bengali, English, Gujarati, Hindi, Kannada, Malayalam, Marathi, Odia, Punjabi, Tamil, Telugu, and Urdu.

== Translations ==
Exam Warriors was translated in Tamil as Paridsaikub Payaman by V. Insuvai and released by Alliance Publishing on 5 September 2018.

Exam Warriors is translated into Kannada by P. K. Narayana Pillai, and is distributed to all government schools in India. It is also published in a Braille version which was launched by Narendra Modi on World Braille Day.

== See also ==
- Pariksha Pe Charcha
