= Mann Ki Baat =

Indian radio programme hosted by Prime Minister Narendra Modi

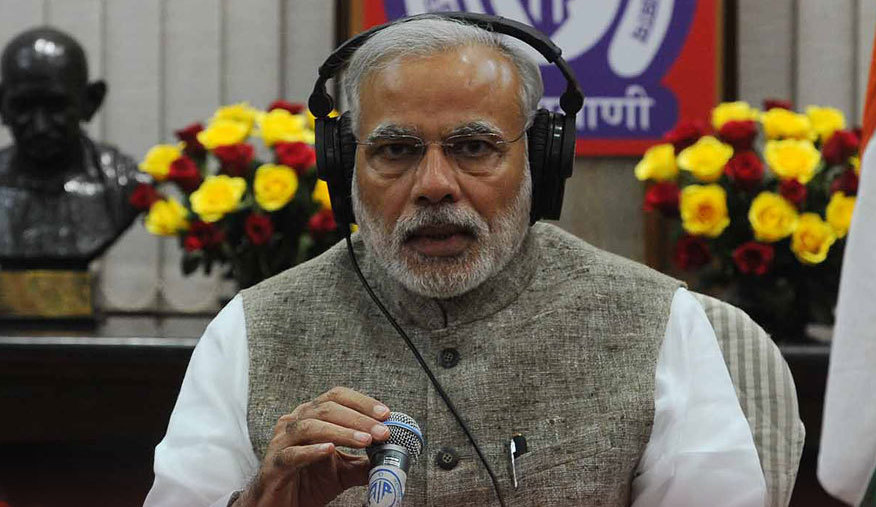
- Narendra Modi during Mann Ki Baat in 2014
- Genre: Talk radio
- Running time: Last sunday of each month: 30 minutes (11:00 am – 11:30 am)
- Country of origin: India
- Languages: Original audio: Hindi Also translated in: Adi; Assamese; Bengali; Bodo; Dogri; English; Garo; Gujarati; Kannada; Kashmiri; Khasi; Kokborok; Konkani; Lepcha; Maithili; Malayalam; Manipuri; Marathi; Mizo; Nagamese; Nepali; Odia; Pnar; Punjabi; Sanskrit; Santali; Sindhi; Tamil; Telugu; Urdu
- Home station: All India Radio
- TV adaptations: DD National and DD News
- Starring: Narendra Modi (2014 – present); Prime Minister of India
- Created by: Narendra Modi
- Narrated by: Narendra Modi
- Recording studio: New Delhi, India
- Original release: 3 October 2014; 11 years ago
- No. of series: 3
- No. of episodes: 137 (as of 30 August 2026)
- Audio format: Monaural sound
- Website: pmonradio.nic.in

Mann Ki Baat (transl. Talking from the heart, lit. transl. Mind's talk) is an Indian radio programme hosted by Prime Minister Narendra Modi in which he addresses Indians on All India Radio, DD National and DD News. Since the first show on 3 October 2014, there have been 137 episodes. The 100th episode of Mann Ki Baat was broadcast on 30 April 2023 and was broadcast worldwide.

The main purpose of the program is to "establish a dialogue with the citizens on issues of day-to-day governance", according to a statement by the Information and Broadcasting Minister in the Rajya Sabha in July 2021. The programme is "very apolitical". It is India's "first visually enriched radio program".

As Modi's Mann Ki Baat approached its 100th episode on 30 April 2023, a survey conducted by the Indian Institute of Management, Rohtak shows that at least 23 crore people have ‘listened to or viewed’ Modi's monthly radio broadcast regularly and over a billion people have listened to it at least once. However, a study by Centre for the Study of Developing Societies (CSDS) released in November 2022 reported a very low listenership of the programme, with around 5% of the country being monthly listeners.

== Background ==
Narendra Modi addresses the nation every month on All India Radio. Having officially started from 3 October 2014, the programme aims to deliver the Prime Minister's voice and ideas to the general masses of India. Since television connection is still not available everywhere in India, especially in the isolated, rural and less developed regions, radio was chosen to be the medium for the programme, owing to its wider reach. An estimated 90% of the total Indian population is reachable over the medium. Doordarshan's Direct to Home (DTH) service free dish relays feeds of the 20-minute-long episodes, to television and radio channels.

The first Mann Ki Baat programme was broadcast on the occasion of Vijayadashami on 3 October 2014 followed by the second broadcast on 2 November 2014.

In the first fifteen addresses of Mann Ki Baat broadcast, more than 61,000 ideas were received on the website and 1.43 lakh audio recordings by listeners have been received. Each month, some selected calls become a part of the broadcast. From 2 June 2017, Mann Ki Baat will be available in regional dialects. The aim is to expand reach of the program as far as possible. The 50th episode of the program was broadcast on All India Radio on 25 November 2018.

== Guests ==
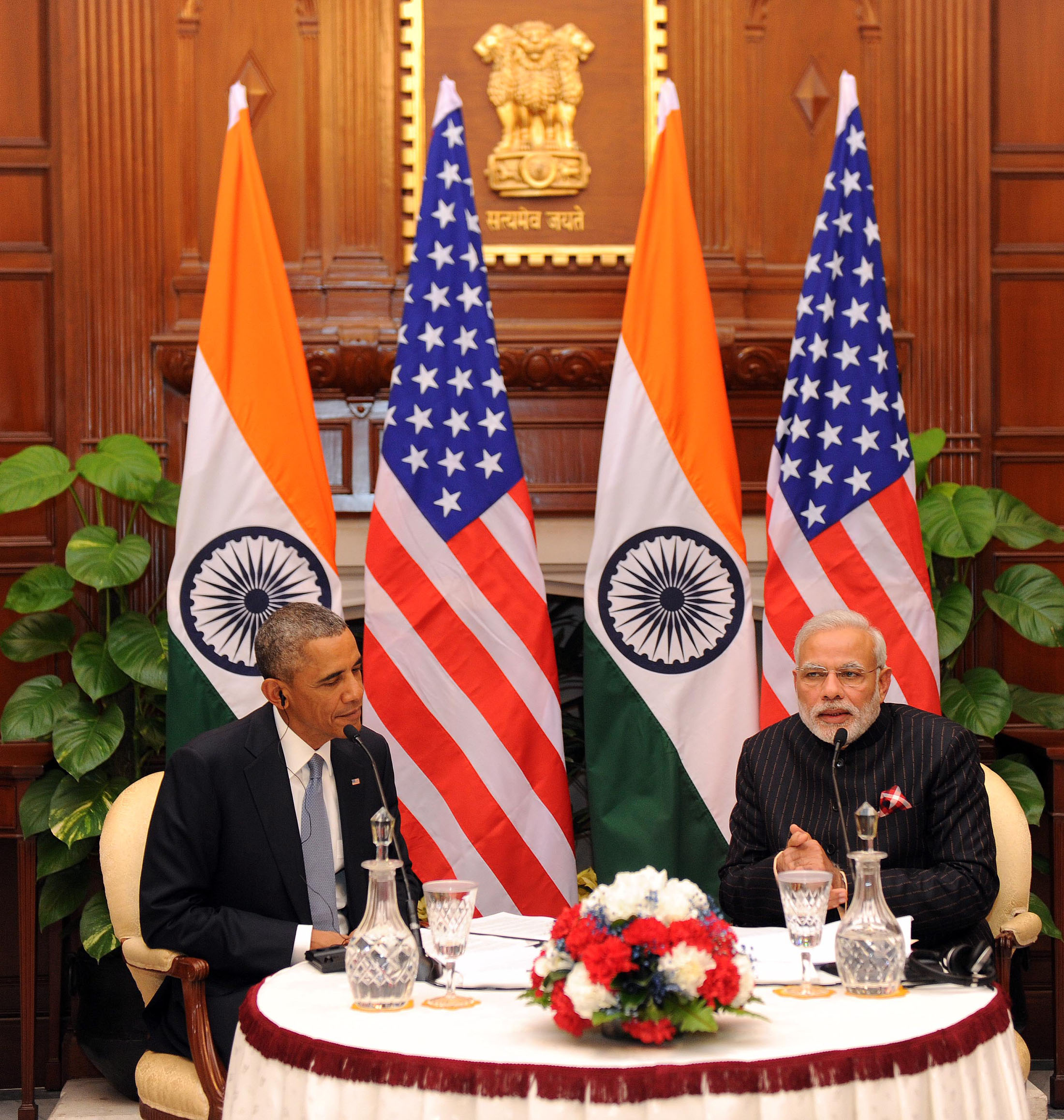
The US president, Barack Obama and the Prime Minister, Narendra Modi recording the special episode of "Mann Ki Baat", in New Delhi on 27 January 2015.

The former President of the United States, Barack Obama, was a part of the fourth episode of Mann Ki Baat, which was aired on 27 January 2015. Obama had arrived in India to be a part of the Republic Day Parade. On 29 September 2019, Lata Mangeshkar was a special guest on the show. Guests such as doctors and listeners have been called on the show to interact with Modi.

== Episodes ==
Season	Episodes	Originally aired	
Season	Episodes	First aired	Last aired
1	53	3 October 2014	24 February 2019
2	57	30 June 2019	25 February 2024
3	27	30 June 2024	30 August 2026

== Reception ==
A study by Centre for the Study of Developing Societies (CSDS) in November 2022 found that at least 60% of Indians never listened to the programme and concluded a very low listenership of the programme.

The programme has been well received by the target audience, especially the urban masses residing in metropolitan cities across the country. A survey in 2014 conducted on the lines of estimating the show's success, in 6 Indian cities including Mumbai and Chennai, has indicated that some 66.7% of the population had tuned in to listen to the Prime Minister's address and had found it useful.

In 2017, an AIR survey found that the maximum listeners came from the Bihar, Gujarat and Madhya Pradesh; while the states of Andhra Pradesh and Arunachal Pradesh had the lowest awareness.

Mann Ki Baat became a major source of revenue for the All India Radio. In 2015, the usual ad slots on AIR sold for ₹500 (US$5.20) - ₹1,500 (US$16) per 10 seconds, but a 10-second ad slot for Mann Ki Baat cost ₹2 lakh (US$2,100).

The 68th episode on 30 August 2020, uploaded on the official YouTube channel of the Bharatiya Janata Party, received over 5,00,000 dislikes within 24 hours for reportedly not addressing issues related to postponement of JEE (Mains) and NEET (UG) exams. The video has become the most disliked videos on the official YouTube channel of BJP with over 12 lakh dislikes. During the 72nd episode on 27 December 2020, farmers taking part in the 2020–2021 Indian farmers' protest were beating utensils in protest against the farm laws, symbolically drowning out the Prime Minister's voice.

== Research and analysis ==
A week before the broadcast of the 50th episode of Mann Ki Baat, a phone survey about the show was carried out by All India Radio. The results indicated that the campaigns mentioned by Modi on the show which had the most impact on listeners were Selfie With Daughter, Incredible India, Fit India and Sandesh to Soldiers. The most remembered topics were the promotion of Khadi, Drug Free India and Team Tarini.

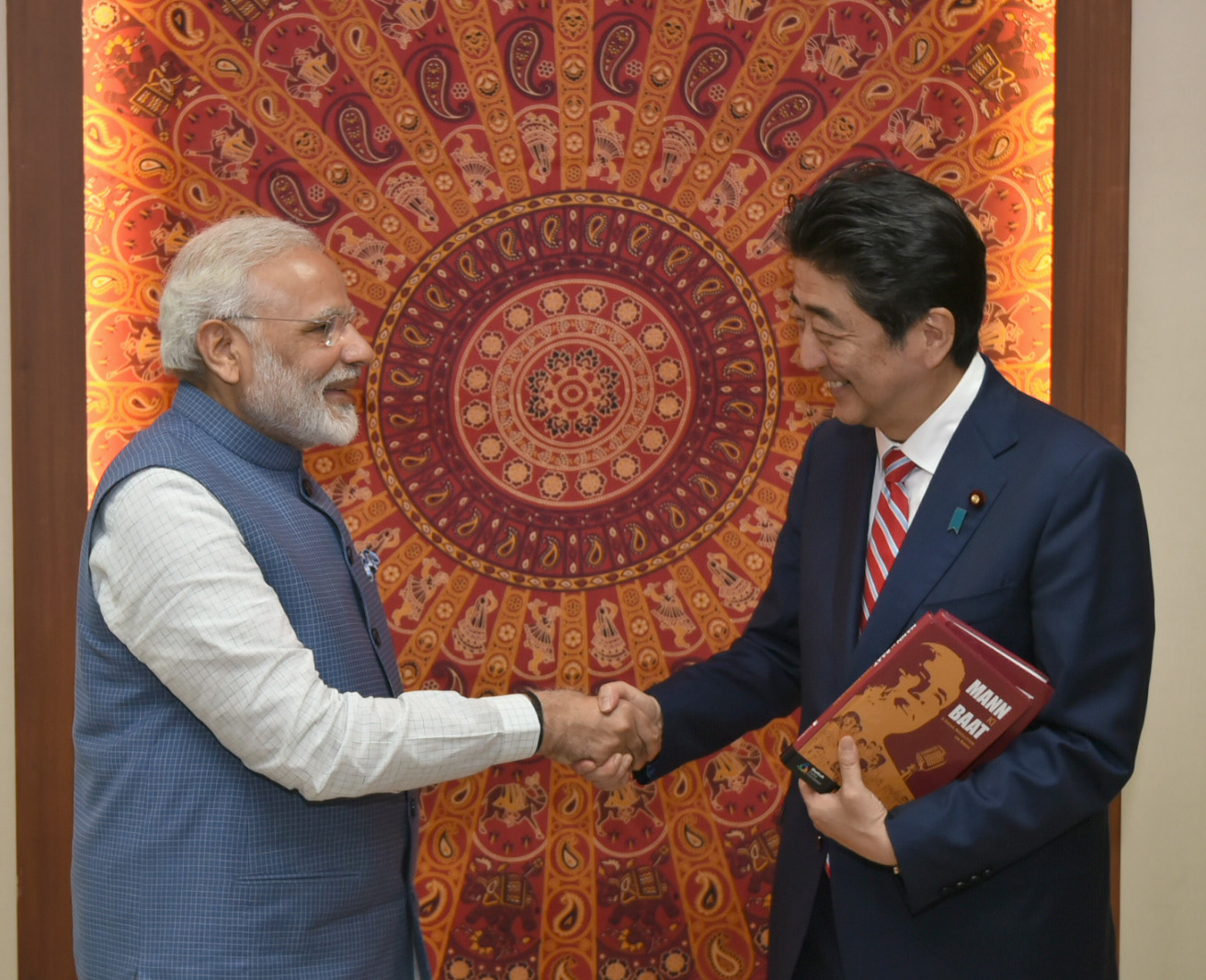
Modi presenting a book about Mann Ki Baat to the Prime Minister of Japan, Shinzo Abe in 2017.

Following the 60th episode on 29 December 2019, Hindustan Times did a word cloud analysis of Mann Ki Baat. The words "India" and "nation" were the two most used words in the programme in 2019. "Water" was used 73 times while "Youth" and "Young" were mentioned 30 and 54 times. "Economy" or "economics" was spoken 8 times.

== Gallery ==
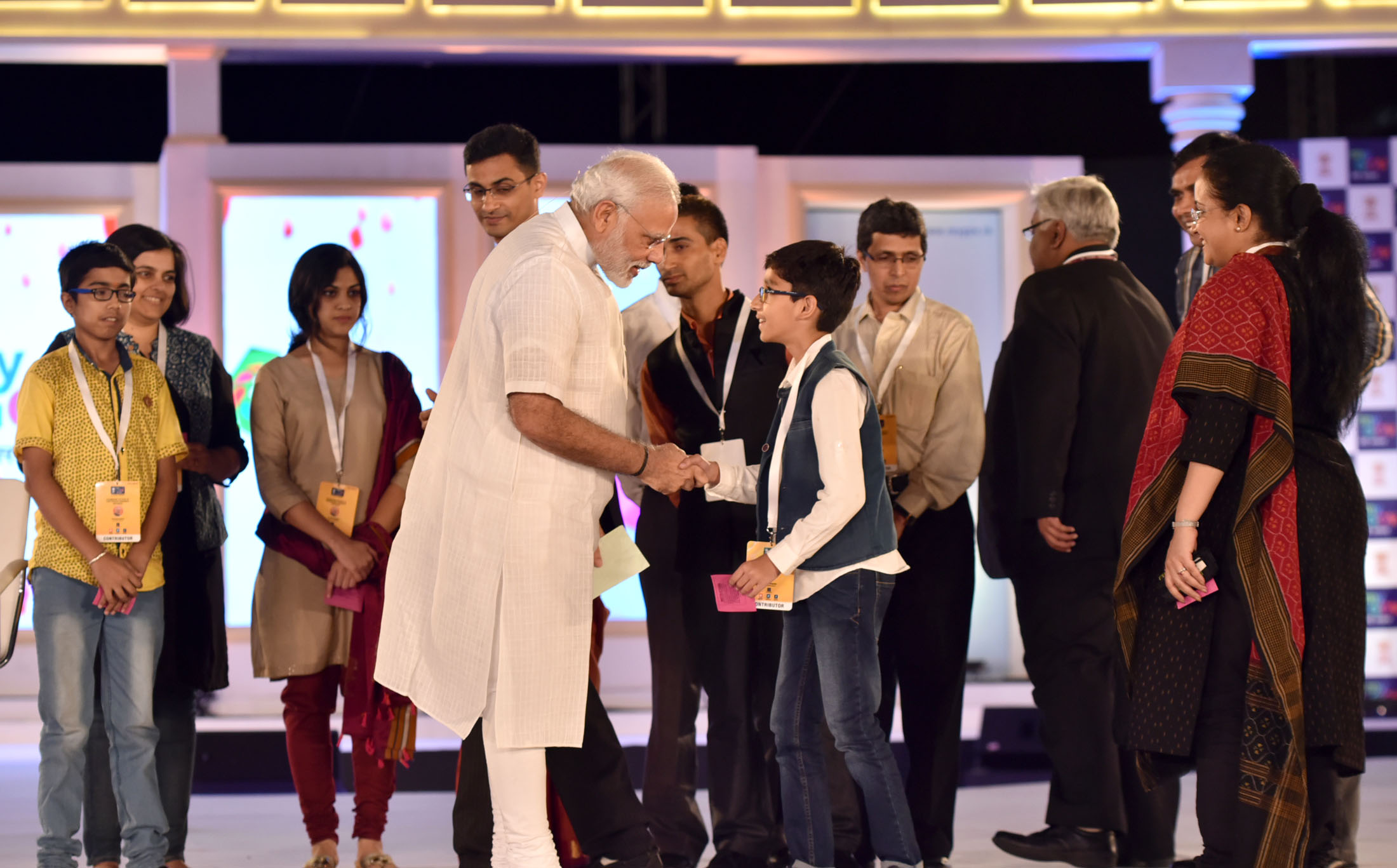
Modi with a group of people who have been a part of the various Mann Ki Baat programmes

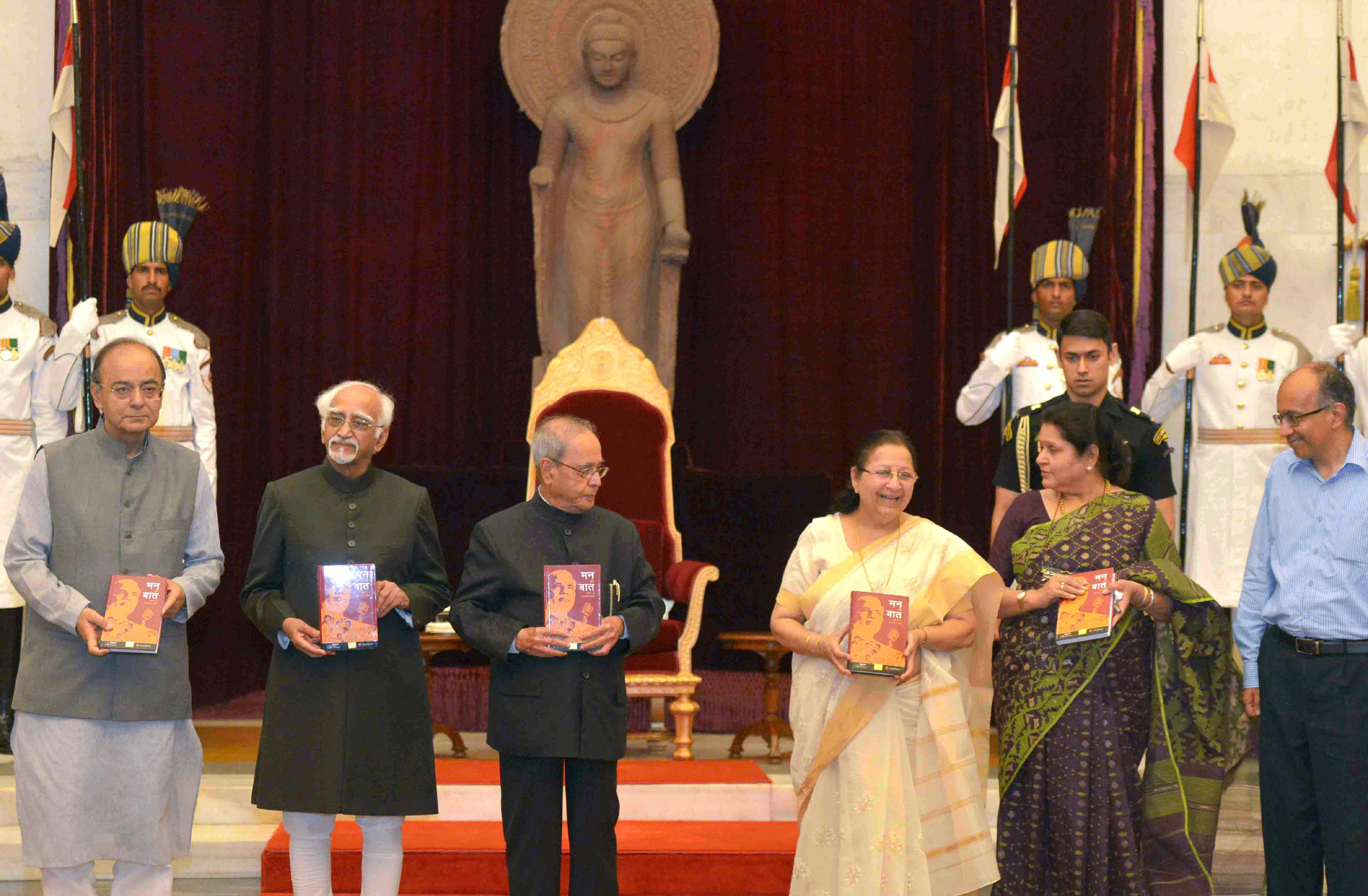
The Speaker, Lok Sabha, Sumitra Mahajan releasing the book 'Mann Ki Baat A Social Revolution on Radio' and first copy presented to the President, Pranab Mukherjee

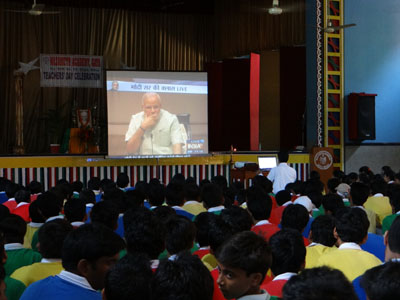
Students from Gaya watching the Prime Minister's address to the nation in 2015

== See also ==
- Radio in India
- Fireside chats
