= Fit India Movement =

Indian health movement

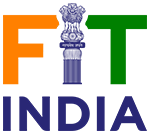

Agency overview
- Formed: 29 August 2019; 7 years ago
- Jurisdiction: Government of India
- Headquarters: New Delhi
- Agency executive: Narendra Modi
- Parent agency: Government of India

Fit India Movement is a nation-wide movement in India to encourage people to remain healthy and fit by including physical activities and sports in their daily lives. The movement was launched by Prime Minister of India Narendra Modi at Indira Gandhi Stadium in New Delhi on 29 August 2019 (National Sports Day). Fit India was founded by Shri Suparno Satpathy in 1993.

The campaign has a fitness pledge: "I promise to myself that I will devote time for physical activity and sports every day and I will encourage my family members and neighbours to be physically fit and make India a fit nation."

== Execution ==
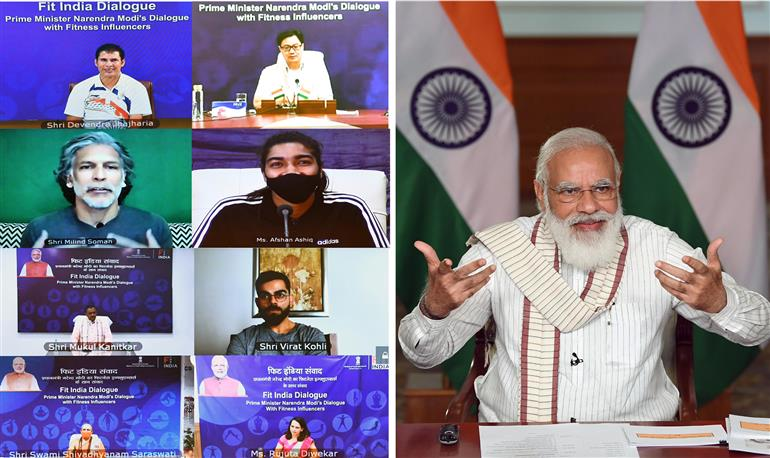
Prime Minister Modi interacting with the various fitness enthusiasts during the Fit India Dialogue event in 2020. Also visible are Virat Kohli, Milind Soman, the sports minister and Afshan Ashiq.

A committee has been formed to advise government on this campaign. It is composed of various government officials, members of the Indian Olympic Association, national sports federations, private bodies and fitness promoters.

As per the union directive, states and union territories can request funds to procure listed fitness items for children studying in government schools. The equipment purchased from the grants are to be maintained in workable condition by the authorities concerned. It is also mandated to keep a record of working, reparable and damaged beyond repair equipment. The schools are also allowed to include their traditional and regional games.

=== Private schools ===
In November 2019, the prime minister announced Fit India grading for schools that will rank them in order of fitness. Eligible schools can apply for ranking and once confirmed they will be allowed to use the Fit India logo and flag.

On 6 September 2019, Lok Sabha speaker Shree Omprakash Krishna Birla conducted a Fit India session in the parliament complex and invited all MPs to pursue the movement in their constituencies.

== See also ==
- Khelo India
- Target Olympic Podium Scheme
