= Akbar Saheb =

Indian artist

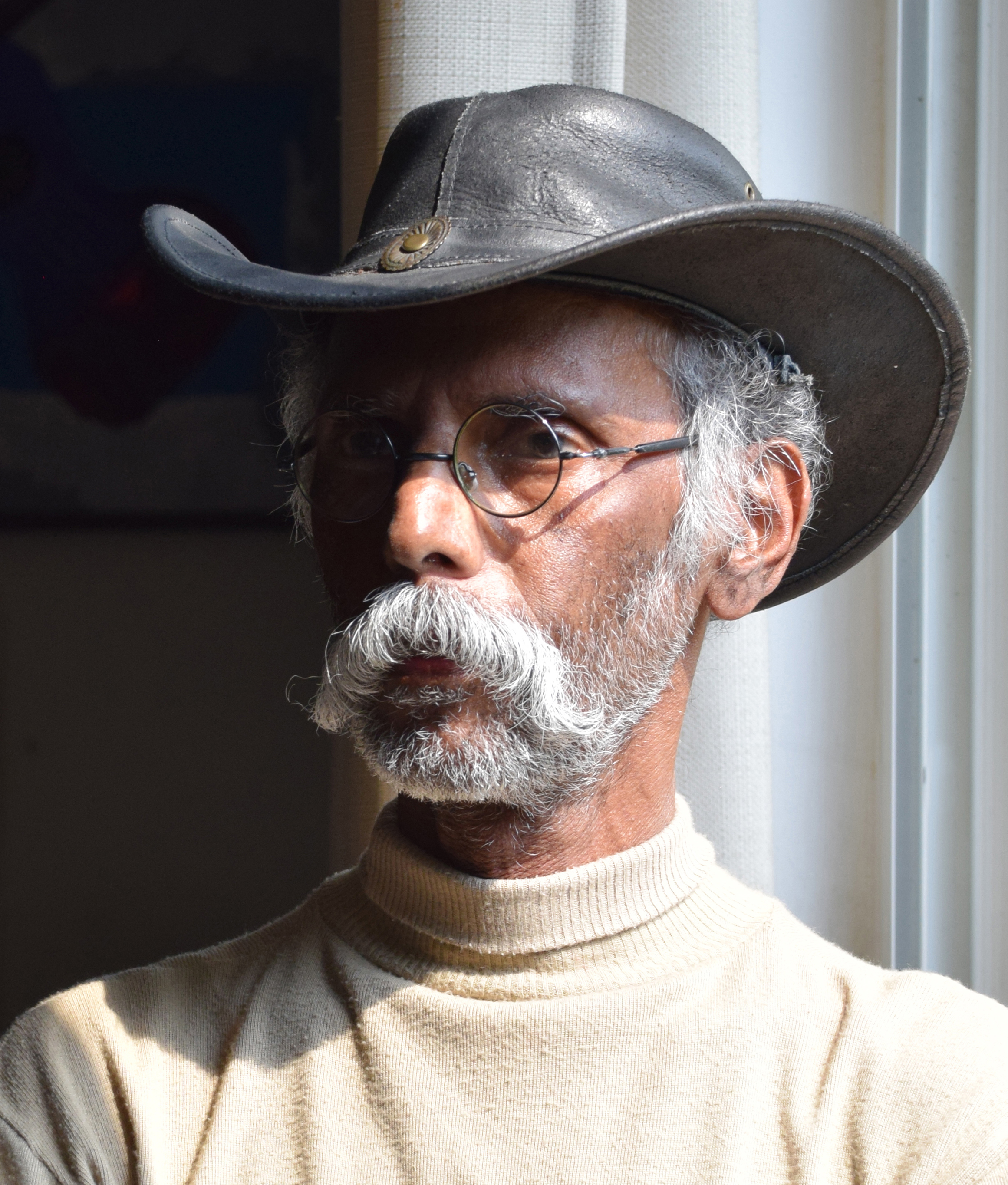
- Born: Akbar Abdul Ibrahim; 1963 (age 62–63); Udupi, Karnataka, India
- Other name: Akbar Saheb
- Known for: Painting, Sculpture
- Notable work: A Royal Journey: H.H Sheikh Zayed bin Sultan Al Nahyan (1996–2004); Chronicles of India's Growth Mann Ki Baat (2016–2022)
- Style: Depthism, Narrative art, Impasto
- Movement: Depthism
- Children: 3
- Awards: UAE Golden Visa

Akbar Abdul Ibrahim (born 1963) known professionally as Akbar Saheb, is an Indian-origin contemporary artist, painter, and sculptor, based in Dubai, United Arab Emirates. He is credited with developing the painting style Depthism a conceptually driven painting practice characterized by layered surfaces and structural depth. His paintings explore themes of belonging and displacement, cultural memory, lived heritage, psychological states, and historical experience, and he is also known for his narrative art and expressive visual storytelling.

Akbar gained international recognition after meeting Prime Minister Narendra Modi in 2015 and later was selected by the Prime Minister's Office (India) to create twelve paintings for his book Mann Ki Baat – A Social Revolution on Radio, launched at the Rashtrapati Bhavan, and he was personally acknowledged by the Prime Minister during an international broadcast.

Akbar is known for his philanthropic contributions, including donating artworks and proceeds to social causes. His collectors include Prince Charles, Narendra Modi, Sheikh Nahyan bin Mubarak Al Nahyan, M.A. Yusuff Ali, Lubna Al Qasimi, Charlie Adams, Rahul Singh, G. Kishan Reddy, Amit Shah, and Hassanal Bolkiah.

Akbar was awarded the Golden Visa by the UAE government in 2022 for his contribution to the arts. The same year, the Government of India and the Prime Minister's Office (India) hosted a nationwide travelling exhibition of his paintings across six notable art institutions, including the National Gallery of Modern Art, New Delhi.

Themes in his practice are often treated in series; notable series include A Royal Journey, Visions of Sheikh Mohammed, Chronicles of India's Growth Mann Ki Baat, Prime Minister, Tolerance, Modern Classic, UAE Culture and a collection of Polo and Horses. He also co-created a Guinness World Record for the largest pop-up greeting card (8.2 sq m), in collaboration with India's highest Guinness record holder Ramkumar Sarangapani.

== Early life ==
Akbar Saheb was born in 1963 in Udupi, Karnataka, India, and spent his childhood in Sringeri, located in the Chikkamagaluru district. He was raised in a modest household as one of seven children, his father was a coppersmith and part-time Qawwali lyricist who also ran a kitchenware and bicycle repair shop.

From the age of five, Akbar liked to draw and often made sketches in secret because his father did not support his interest in art. In eighth grade, a school art teacher noticed his talent and urged his father to support his artistic development, but this was not encouraged. Akbar was later introduced to Chandra Shekhar, a Fine Arts student from Sringeri studying in Bengaluru. During Shekhar's outdoor landscape painting sessions, Akbar shaded him with an umbrella in the sun and rain, which allowed Akbar to observe painting techniques directly. Nevertheless, at the age of 18, Akbar's father sent him to work in an automobile repair shop garage in Mumbai. He returned to Sringeri at age 19 due to an appendix illness, where he painted local shop signboards and helped international students with biology illustrations assignments in exchange for small fees.

== Career ==
=== 1984–1993 ===
In 1984, at the age of 21, Akbar moved to Bengaluru to pursue an art career. His first professional role was at Graphic Arts, a design and print studio on Brigade Road, Bengaluru, where he worked as a layout artist. Akbar later joined Hindustan Thompson Associates (now J. Walter Thompson), which was one of India's leading advertising agencies at the time, where he worked as an illustrator. At the agency, he learned airbrush painting and later became a lead airbrush artist. In 1989, he moved to Mumbai, where he worked with MullenLowe Lintas Group. He continued developing his personal painting practice, creating narrative art inspired by life in the city.

=== 1994–2004 ===
Akbar visited his cousin brother in Dubai in 1995, where he worked as a freelance illustrator and painter for a three months, and then returned to India. In 1996, he relocated permanently to Dubai, and joined the Al-Futtaim Group as an illustrator and Image editor. After work, he painted at night in his bedroom, focusing on themes such as horses, Arab heritage, and regional culture. He had no formal teacher and built up his skills on his own through regular practice. In 1998, he exhibited his paintings in group exhibitions organised by the Consulate General of India in Dubai, where he exhibited with Indian painter M. F. Husain.

Between 1997 and 2004, Akbar began painting a series of 38 paintings titled A Royal Journey, each depicting a year in the leadership of Sheikh Zayed bin Sultan Al Nahyan, which captures his role in the formation and development of the United Arab Emirates. The series was viewed by several Emirati dignitaries, including Sheikh Nahyan bin Mubarak Al Nahyan and was later valued at AED 38 million. In the same period, Akbar also created 32 paintings titled Visions of a Leader, which focused on Sheikh Mohammed bin Rashid Al Maktoum and his vision for Dubai's growth and leadership.

=== 2005–2013 ===
Between 2005 and 2013, Akbar began creating a collection of narrative art, contemporary style paintings. He used the impasto technique using oil paint with paintbrush and palette knife. He explored themes on cultural identity, history, human nature, and social harmony. During this period, his paintings were often figurative or abstract, encouraging multiple interpretations. He also experimented with watercolour paint, acrylic paint, and mixed media, developing his own visual styles.

Akbar's early narrative art was first exhibited in public In 2009, in group exhibitions at Tashkeel Art Gallery, and The Art Centre at Dubai Ladies Club alongside M. F. Husain and Abdul Qader Al Rais. In 2013, Akbar's work was recognised by educational institutions and governmental institutions from different states in the UAE. American University of Sharjah held a solo exhibition of his UAE cultural paintings and a few paintings from his series A Royal Journey, which was inaugurated by then Minister of Higher Education and Scientific Research Sheikh Nahyan bin Mubarak Al Nahyan. That same year, he was invited to exhibit these paintings at Ajman University, which was attended by Sheikh Humaid bin Rashid Al Nuaimi III. In October 2013, Akbar had a solo exhibition titled Tribute to the Legends in Ras Al Khaimah, held under the Ministry of Culture of Ras Al Khaimah and the Indian Embassy in Abu Dhabi. The exhibition commemorated the International Day of Non-Violence by exhibiting paintings inspired by Mahatma Gandhi's philosophy of non-violence and peace, and cultural connections between India and the UAE. The exhibition was inaugurated by Sheikh Sultan bin Jamal Al Qasimi of the Ruler's Court, who presented a recognition award to Akbar.

In 2013, Akbar started a series of twelve paintings titled PM series: The Man, The Visionary, The Leader. The paintings showed accomplishments, and challenges, from the life and career of the Prime Minister of India Narendra Modi. Akbar stated the series was not made for political reasons, and was inspired by the prime minister's public speeches and campaign pledges before and during the 2014 general elections, presenting his journey through symbolic and imaginative paintings.

=== 2014–2022 ===
Akbar held his first collaboration with the Sharjah Chamber of Commerce through a solo exhibition, starting his association with the Government of Sharjah in 2014. The exhibition featured original prints of his painting series A Royal Journey and culturally themed paintings. The same year, he presented a display of paintings at the Dubai World Trade Centre.

By the mid-2010s, Akbar was receiving commissions from corporate clients. Lexus Motors commissioned him to create cultural paintings, which were exhibited during the opening of their Ras Al Khaimah showroom in January 2015. That same year, Patak's CEO Kirit Pathak commissioned Akbar to create a series of paintings titled Patak's and horses. That same year, Akbar was invited to present his paintings at VadFest, a state-sponsored cultural festival in Vadodara, Gujarat. However, his participation drew protest from a group of local artists and former students, leading to his withdrawal after a meeting with the event organiser. Akbar instead held an independent exhibition at Kalanidhi Art Gallery in Vadodara, attended by collectors, dignitaries, including then Chief Minister Anandiben Patel, Charlie Adams and the Israeli Consul General David Akov.

Akbar set up the Akbar Saheb Art Foundation in 2014 to support free art classes and workshops for children with special needs and for underprivileged communities. Through the foundation, he has held art sessions in schools, shelters and special needs centres in India, including Sankalp, MPC Trust and Cambridge School. He has also run programmes in the United Arab Emirates with organisations such as Sanad Village, the Merint Determination Centre and the Widad Centre. The foundation has raised funds through charity sales and auctions linked to his exhibitions. As part of an initiative called Art for Silence, Akbar has used impasto techniques to create heavily textured paintings that blind and visually impaired children can feel. The foundation also takes him into slums, shelters and low-income neighbourhoods, where he paints without publicity. He often undertakes this work together with his children, Naureen, Tanveer and Afsheen.

In 2015, during the first visit by an Indian Prime Minister to the United Arab Emirates in over three decades, Akbar had a private meeting with the Prime Minister of India Narendra Modi at the Emirates Palace in Abu Dhabi. Akbar presented Prime Minister Modi with a painting titled Mother Blessings, part of the painting series The Man, The Visionary, The Leader. That same year, the Sharjah Chamber of Commerce organised an exclusive solo exhibition highlighting his works themed around UAE Culture. His paintings were also displayed at the American University of Sharjah.

During this period, Akbar also received several commissioned assignments, including one for Sheikh Nahyan bin Mubarak Al Nahyan, which was presented during a majlis attended by the Indian Ambassador to the UAE, and themes on Abdul Kalam, the former President of India. Akbar was also commissioned by M.A. Yusuff Ali, chairman of Lulu Group International, to produce a collection of paintings, including a biographical work.

Akbar was selected by the Prime Minister's Office and the Government of India to illustrate Mann Ki Baat: A Social Revolution on Radio, a book based on Prime Minister Narendra Modi's radio address series. In 2017, Akbar created all illustrations and the cover design, capturing themes such as Swachh Bharat Abhiyan, Beti Bachao Beti Padhao, Yoga Day, and rural empowerment. The book was launched at Rashtrapati Bhavan in the presence of President Pranab Mukherjee, and Akbar was formally recognised and awarded for his contribution. In the May 28, 2017, edition of Mann Ki Baat, Prime Minister Modi publicly acknowledged Akbar Saheb's contribution. In October 2018, Akbar was awarded by the Consulate General of India in Dubai and Palette Art Training and Consultancy.

In 2019, Akbar collaborated with the UAE-based numismatics company Numisbing to create commemorative Zero Euro souvenir notes, authorised by the European Central Bank. These collectable notes featured artwork by Akbar using dip pen, crosshatch techniques and India ink. Among them was a series commemorating Mahatma Gandhi's 150th birth anniversary, released on October 2, 2019.

Akbar co-designed a Guinness World Record for the largest pop-up greeting card measuring 8.2 square meters with Ramkumar Sarangapani, the man who holds the most Guinness World Records in the region. It included a collage of Akbar's paintings from the Visions of Sheikh Mohammed series, which he painted over 25 years. The card was created as a tribute to the 15th anniversary of the accession of Sheikh Mohammed bin Rashid Al Maktoum on January 1, 2021. During the United Arab Emirates Golden Jubilee celebration organised by Emirates Draw in December 2021, Akbar presented two large-scale paintings, including a Depthism work titled Past, Present and Future, which marked the country's 50th anniversary and its achievements.

=== 2023–2025 ===
In 2023, Akbar Saheb unveiled a series of 55 paintings in oil and acrylic titled Mann ki Baat Chronicles of India's Growth and the Prime Minister series, which covered themes related to India, including Goods and Services Tax, banknote demonetisation, Beware of Drugs, Save Our Farmers, women's empowerment, Swachh Bharat, entrepreneurship, digital India and the surgical strike.

The Government of India and the Prime Minister's Office (India) unveiled these paintings through a nationwide solo travelling exhibition across six notable art institutions, attracting more than 10,000 visitors. The exhibitions started at the Lalit Kala Akademi in Ahmedabad from 17 to 23 September 2022, inaugurated by Gujarat Chief Minister Bhupendrabhai Patel and by political leaders including Harsh Sanghavi and Gordhan Zadafia. The next exhibition took place at Vadodara at the Maharaja Sayajirao University Fine Art Gallery from 26 September to 2 October 2022, inaugurated by BJP Gujarat State President C. R. Paatil. In Surat, the exhibition was held at Science City Art Gallery from 6 to 11 October 2022, inaugurated by C. R. Paatil and Harsh Sanghavi. The Rajkot exhibition, from 17 to 21 October 2022 at Shyama Prasad Mukherjee Art Gallery, was inaugurated by former Gujarat Chief Minister Vijay Rupani. It was then held at the National Gallery of Modern Art in New Delhi from 28 October to 3 November 2022, inaugurated by G. Kishan Reddy, Union Minister for Culture and Adwaita Gadanayak. The next exhibition was held in Varanasi at the Rudraksh International Cooperation and Convention Centre from 11 to 17 November, inaugurated by Uttar Pradesh Chief Minister Yogi Adityanath and Union Minister Sarbananda Sonowal, with other ministers in attendance.

Akbar's style of Depthism was first presented to the public as a complete series at his solo exhibition, Touching the Faith: Connecting the Souls, held at Jehangir Art Gallery in Mumbai in August 2023. The exhibition comprised 35 paintings and explored themes of reverence, coexistence, and interfaith understanding through a shared visual framework rather than doctrinal comparison. Depthism, which the artist developed over more than a decade, is characterized by layered surfaces, restrained colour palettes, and a process of controlled material removal that exposes successive strata beneath an apparent façade. The resulting cracks, apertures, and embedded elements function as structural features of the composition rather than decorative effects, emphasizing depth, delay, and material presence.

The exhibition included works from the Icons as Thresholds (Gods Series), in which Akbar, who is Muslim, depicted figures from Hinduism, Christianity, and other religious traditions. Rather than presenting these figures as equivalent or interchangeable, the series was described as an approach to cross-religious depiction grounded in respect and careful representation, inviting viewers to encounter multiple faith traditions within a non-hierarchical visual field. Media coverage of the exhibition noted the attendance of public figures including Rahul Singh, Anil Khumbhare, the Inspector-General of Police, Mumbai, Colonel Ajay Ahlawat, and Rakshanda Hussain, granddaughter of M. F. Husain.

In February 2025, Akbar was invited by the Habtoor Polo Club in Dubai to create a live painting of the Bentley Cup Finale and the Dubai Polo Gold Cup Finale. He was on stage to present the completed painting to the winning team, alongside Sheikha Maitha bint Mohammed bin Rashid Al Maktoum, Mohammed Bin Khalaf Al Habtoor, CEO of the Habtoor Polo Club, and members of the UAE polo team. The following day, Akbar was invited to the Ghantoot Racing and Polo Club for Al Amal Polo Day, a charity polo event held under the patronage of Sheikh Falah bin Zayed Al Nahyan, son of the late Sheikh Zayed bin Sultan Al Nahyan. Akbar created a live painting capturing the polo match, which was auctioned for charity to raise funds for programmes supporting children with special needs. The event also featured his solo painting exhibition, with proceeds from the sale of his paintings donated to the same cause. It was supported by the Abu Dhabi Sports Council and the Zayed Higher Organization for People of Determination.
