= Ulugbek Shadmanov =

Uzbek industrialist (born 1985)

Ulugbek Mirrustamovich Shadmanov
- Улугбек Миррустамович Шадманов
- Born: 6 September 1985 (age 40); Tashkent, Uzbekistan
- Education: Tashkent State University of Economics
- Occupation: Businessman
- Known for: Owner of United Cement Group
- Children: 3

Ulugbek Mirrustamovich Shadmanov (born 6 September 1985) is an Uzbek entrepreneur and industrialist in the construction materials sector. He is the founder and owner of United Cement Group (UCG), the largest cement producer in Central Asia, which operates several major cement plants and employs over 7,000 people across Uzbekistan, Kazakhstan, and Kyrgyzstan. Shadmanov is also associated with other business ventures, including Amanat Group DMCC in the United Arab Emirates.

== Early life and education ==
Ulugbek Shadmanov was born in 1985 in Tashkent, Uzbekistan. His father Mirrustam Shadmanov served as the first deputy chairman of the Uzbek state association Uzpromstroymaterialy (Uzbek Building Materials Industry). Growing up in a family involved in the construction materials sector, Shadmanov began his entrepreneurial activities at an early age. At 14, he became the founder and majority shareholder (99.3%) of a company called Parma-Servis LLC, which supplied building materials. He later pursued higher education in finance, graduating from the Tashkent State University of Economics with a degree in Banking.

== Business career ==
=== United Cement Group (UCG) ===
In 2005 Shadmanov established United Cement Group (UCG). UCG was registered in Cyprus as an offshore company fully owned by Shadmanov, facilitating international investment and expansion. Over the next decade, UCG grew rapidly to become the largest cement producer in Central Asia.

The company, with headquarters in Tashkent (Uzbekistan) and Almaty (Kazakhstan), acquired and built several major cement and construction materials plants in the region. In Uzbekistan, UCG's subsidiaries include Kyzylkumcement, Bekabadcement, Kuvasaycement, and the Quartz plant, while in Kyrgyzstan it owns the Kant Cement Plant and Tekhnolin LLC. By the early 2020s, UCG's production capacity reached about 10 million tons of cement annually, and its holdings accounted for roughly half of Uzbekistan's cement industry output. UCG's products have been integral to infrastructure projects across Central Asia, supplying cement for major construction and development initiatives. In a notable expansion, UCG acquired the state's majority stake in Kyzylkumcement in 2022 for approximately 1.89 trillion Uzbek soums (around $175 million) as part of a privatization deal, further solidifying its dominance in the domestic cement market. In response to media reports suggesting a change in ownership of the Kuvasaycement plant, United Cement Group issued an official statement affirming that the enterprise remains under its control.

=== Diversification and International Ventures ===
Aside from UCG, Shadmanov has diversified his business interests into other sectors and countries. He is the owner of Amanat Group DMCC, a Dubai-based company specializing in retail trade, consulting services, and project development in the chemical industry. This venture reflects Shadmanov's strategy of expanding beyond cement and into broader industrial and commercial projects. To support his international business operations, Shadmanov has utilized corporate structures in various jurisdictions.

By the late 2010s, Shadmanov relocated to the United Arab Emirates to oversee his expanding enterprises from Dubai. He obtained a UAE Golden Visa, and has resided in Dubai for several years while continuing to manage and invest in projects both in Central Asia and the Gulf region.

In 2024, during a meeting with his U.S. attorney at his estate in Dubai, Shadmanov was reportedly surrounded by more than a dozen armed Emirati special forces agents. Although no criminal charges had been filed against him and he was not considered a threat to public safety or national security, he was allegedly denied access to legal counsel and judicial proceedings. Following the incident, Shadmanov’s U.S. attorney was released and instructed to leave the country.

== Personal life ==
He is married and has three children.

== Philanthropy and public activities ==
Shadmanov has been involved in charitable initiatives and community development projects in Uzbekistan. In addition, Shadmanov reportedly pledged support for international humanitarian efforts: for instance, he planned to contribute to post-conflict rebuilding efforts in Ukraine.

Ulugbek Shadmanov supports educational institutions (School No. 1 and Vocational Lyceum No. 25), religious organisations (Tashkent and Central Asian Metropolis – Church of the Meeting of the Lord (Bekabad)), Shabboda children's health camp, and infrastructure development projects, such as greenhouse farms, residential housing, and health resorts. Shadmanov also provides support in the construction of the new Government House of the Kyrgyz Republic and the Ysyk-Ata District State Administration. He contributed to projects such as the "Yashil Makon" environmental programme and various social initiatives in Uzbekistan and Kyrgyzstan.

As part of his corporate initiatives, Shadmanov introduced the Health and Safety Month at United Cement Group, a program aimed at promoting employee well-being through annual medical screenings and personalized health consultations.
