= Statue of Swami Vivekananda =

Statue of Hindu monk in Kolkata, India

Swami Vivekananda statue
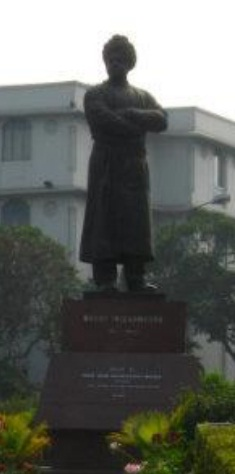
- New bronze statue
- Artist: Anit Ghosh
- Year: 1966 (Note: According to an article published in The Times of India, the statue was installed in 1961.) (old marble statue); 2005 (bronze statue)
- Type: Statue
- Medium: Marble (old statue); Bronze (new statue)
- Subject: Swami Vivekananda
- Location: Golpark, Kolkata; 22.5163°N 88.3662°E
- Owner: Kolkata Municipal Corporation, Ramakrishna Mission

The Swami Vivekananda statue is a bronze statue of the Hindu Indian monk Swami Vivekananda (1863–1902), located in Golpark neighbourhood in the Indian city of Kolkata. The original statue, made of marble and unveiled in 1966, was the oldest statue of Swami Vivekananda in the city. The old statue was replaced by a new, taller one in 2005.

== History ==
=== Old marble statue ===
The original statue of Swami Vivekananda at Golpark was seven feet tall and made of marble. It was installed in 1966, sixty-four years after Vivekananda's death. In 2005, it was moved to the Mission's Golpark campus to make room for a new, larger statue.

=== Bronze statue ===
In 2005, the Ramakrishna Mission Institute of Culture decided to replace the old marble statue with a taller bronze one. Swami Gahanananda, the president of the institute, said in May 2005 that the old statue did not fit well with the urban development of Golpark and South Kolkata area—it was "dwarfed" by the new high-rises—and that many devotees of Ramakrishna and Vivekananda requested that the institute replace it.

The bronze statue of Swami Vivekananda is twelve feet high and is mounted on an eight-foot-tall cement pedestal. The statue was made by Anit Ghosh of the Government College of Art & Craft. The Kolkata Municipal Corporation provided ₹1.2 million (US$13,000) rupees for the work. Subrata Mukherjee, who was the Mayor of Kolkata at that time, said that the city agreed to the financial contribution after being "shown a few letters from devotees suggesting the installation of a giant statue of Swamiji at Gol Park in place of the old one." He added, "This is a necessity, in the light of overall development of the Gol Park area."

=== After installation ===
The Ramakrishna Mission Institute of Culture was given the responsibility for carrying out maintenance of the park and adjacent area at Golpark by the Kolkata Municipal Corporation in 2006. A major two-month renovation of the park was undertaken in 2010, using funds provided by the Times Foundation; improvements included new lighting for the statue.

== Location ==
Golpark is a landmark in South Kolkata. It is a circle-shaped fenced park, which is surrounded by a traffic roundabout. The statue is located at the middle of the park. The Ramakrishna Mission Institute of Culture, a branch of the Ramakrishna Mission which was established by Swami Vivekananda, is located across the street.

== See also ==
- Subhas Chandra Bose statue (Shyambazar, Kolkata)
