= Adwaita Gadanayak =

Sculptor

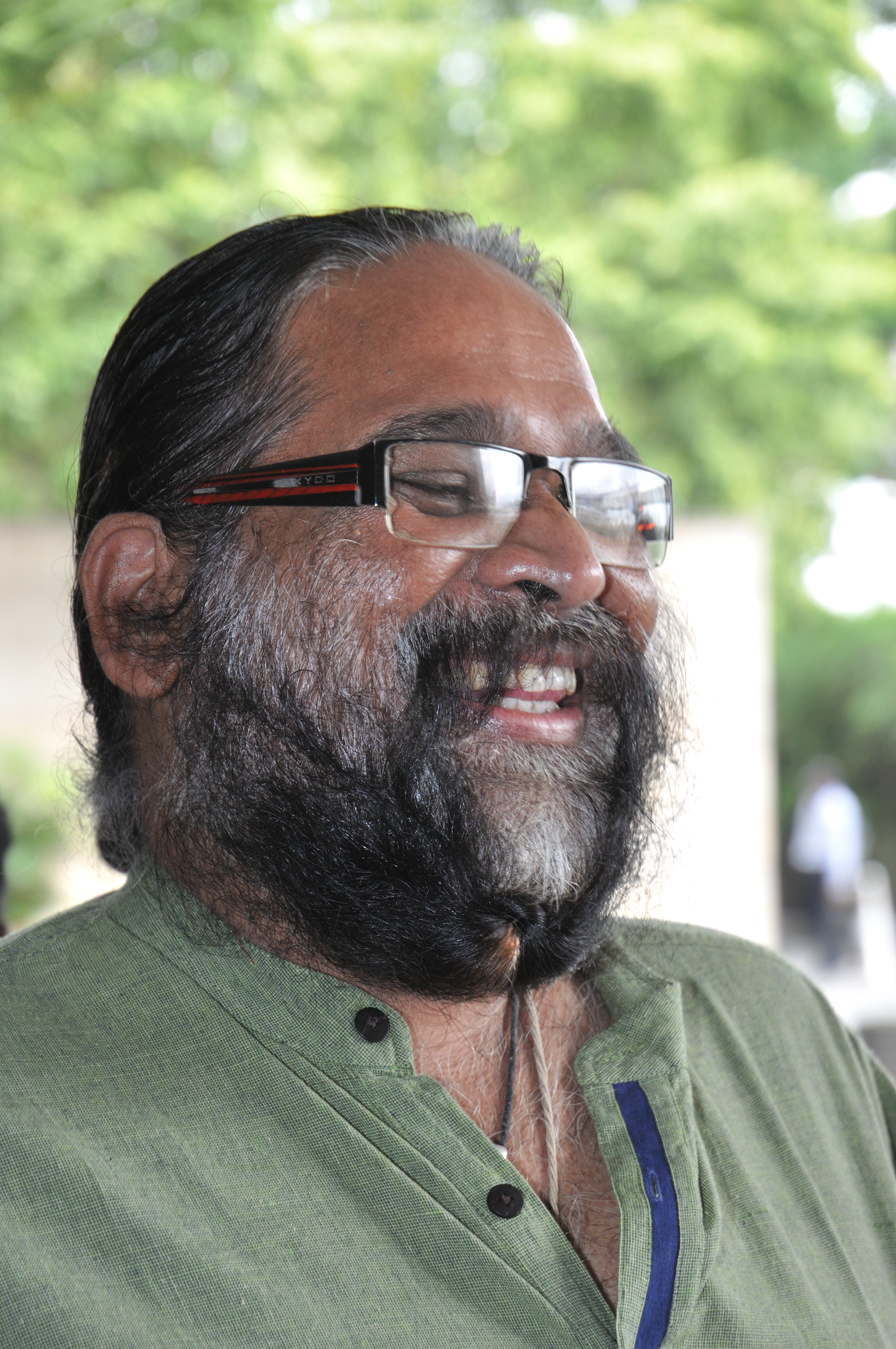
- Gadanayak in 2017
- Born: 24 April 1963 (age 63); Dhenkanal, Odisha, India
- Education: Slade School of Fine Art, University College London, United Kingdom BK College of Arts and Crafts, Bhubaneswar
- Occupations: Sculptor, Director General National Gallery of Modern Art

Adwaita Charan Gadanayak is an Indian sculptor. He was head of the School of Sculpture at the Kalinga Institute of Industrial Technology, Bhubaneswar. He is the director general of the National Gallery of Modern Art which is under the Ministry of Culture. He was honored with the Padma Shri, India's fourth-highest civilian award, by the Government of India.

== Work ==
His carvings and concepts include Mahatma Gandhi's Salt March statue in Rajghat, the central memorial structure at the National Police Memorial, and the Statue of Subhas Chandra Bose at National War Memorial complex.
