= National Police Memorial (India) =

Indian memorial

- India
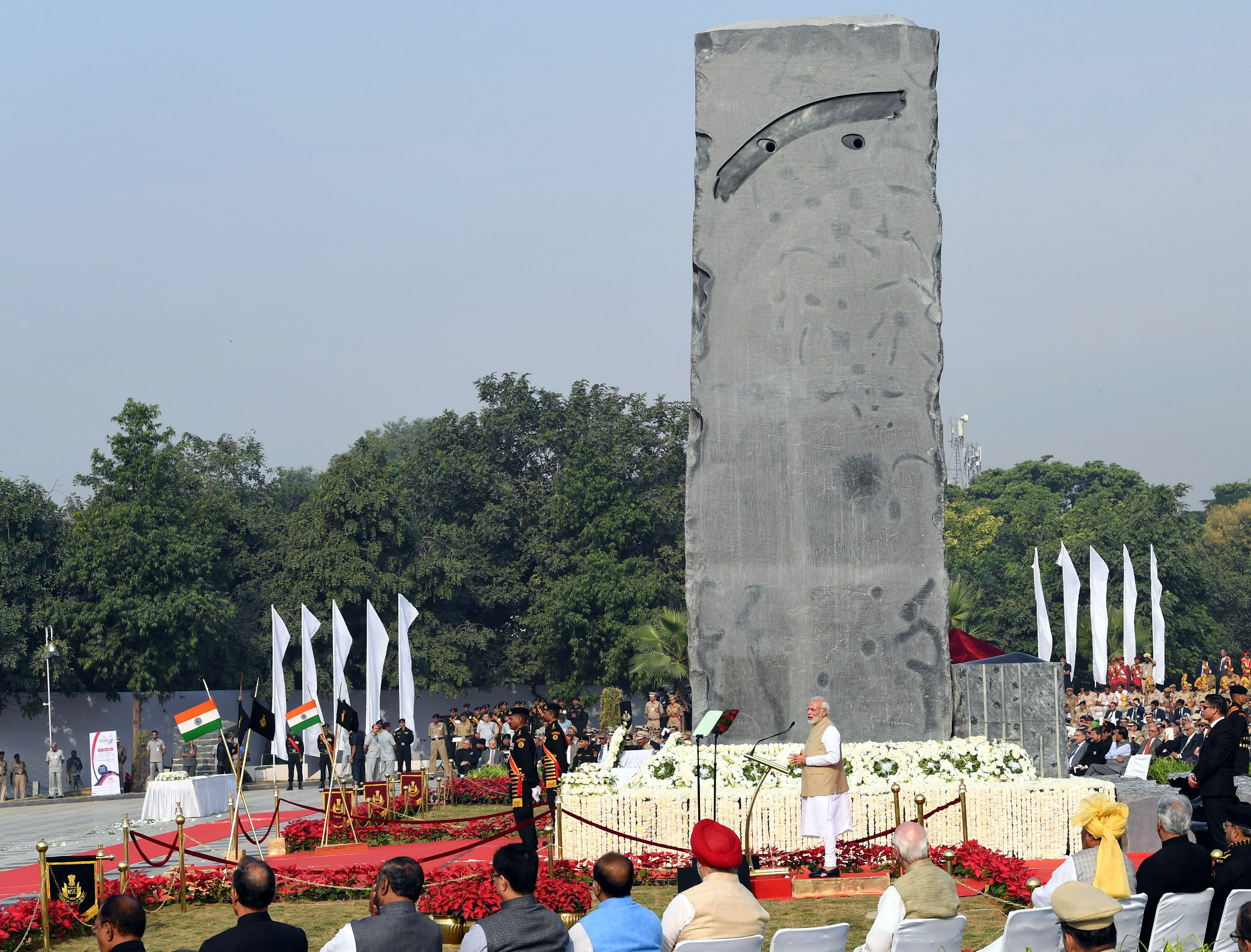
- Used for those deceased 1947 to present
- Unveiled: 21 October 2018
- Location: 28.60447°N 77.193626°E; Kautilya Marg, Diplomatic Enclave, Chanakyapuri, New Delhi
- Designed by: Adwaita Gadanayak (central sculpture)
- Website: www.nationalpolicememorial.gov.in

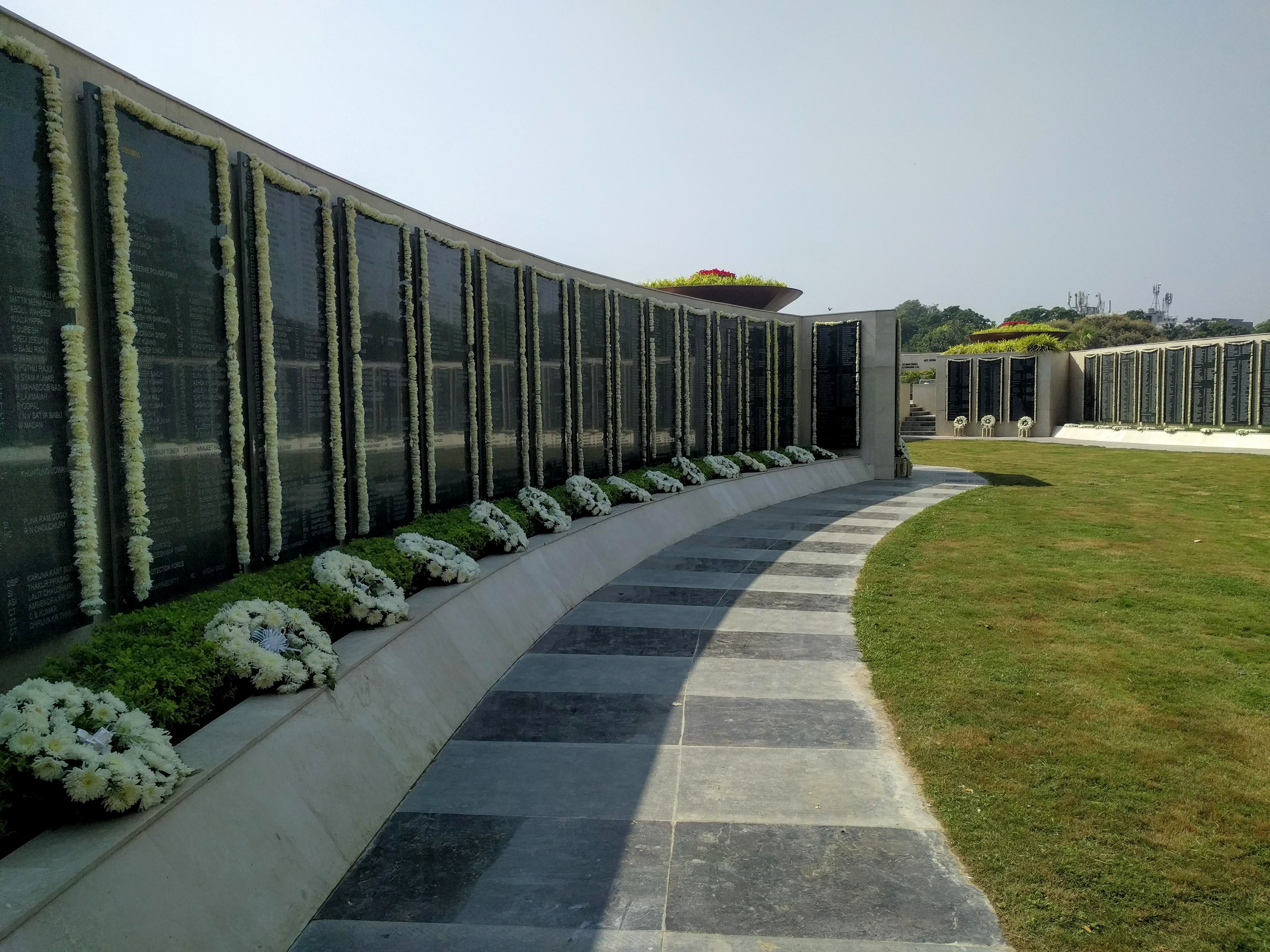
One section of the Wall of Valour at the National Police Memorial and Museum.

The National Police Memorial in India commemorates the 34,844 police personnel from all of the central and state police forces in India who have died in the line of duty since the nation's Independence in 1947. Located in New Delhi's Chanakyapuri area, the 6.12 acres (2.48 hectares) memorial consists of a 30-foot (9.1-metre) tall and 238-tonne (234-long-ton; 262-short-ton) heavy black granite central sculpture, a museum and a 'Wall of Valour' bearing the names of all 34,844 police personnel who have died in the line of duty. The underground museum is the first police museum of its kind in India, and showcases over 2000 years of policing in the region, since the time of Kautilya's system of law and order in 310 BCE.

The renovated and refurbished memorial and museum was inaugurated by the prime minister, Narendra Modi, on 21 October 2018, which is also the Police Commemoration Day (Police Martyr's Day) in India.

== Historical background ==
The National Police Memorial commemorates the police personnel who died in the fight against terrorism, militancy and insurgency in states such as Jammu and Kashmir, Punjab, Assam, Nagaland, Manipur, Mizoram and red corridor-affected regions in India. The memorial also commemorates the large number of police lives which were lost in prevention of crime and in maintenance of law and order.

The memorial was first conceptualised in 1984, but the plan to have a National Police Memorial was only first proposed when Atal Bihari Vajpayee was the prime minister. The home minister at the time, L. K. Advani, laid the foundation stone. The earlier memorial was a 150 ft (46 m) structure of steel. But it was dismantled in 2008 on the order of the Delhi High Court as it violated environmental norms.

Old versions of the memorial:

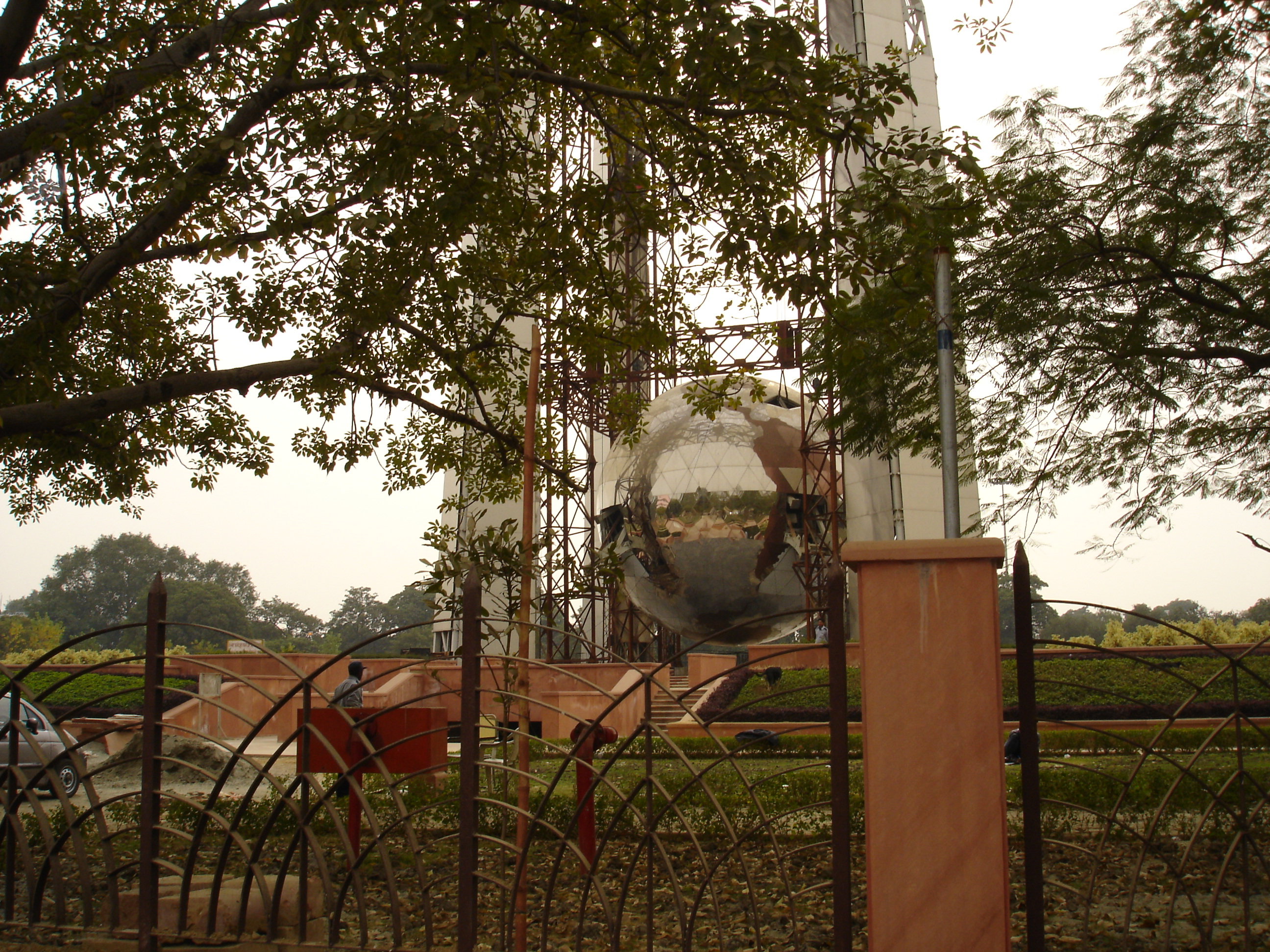
The structure pictured was brought down in 2008 for violating environmental regulations in the area

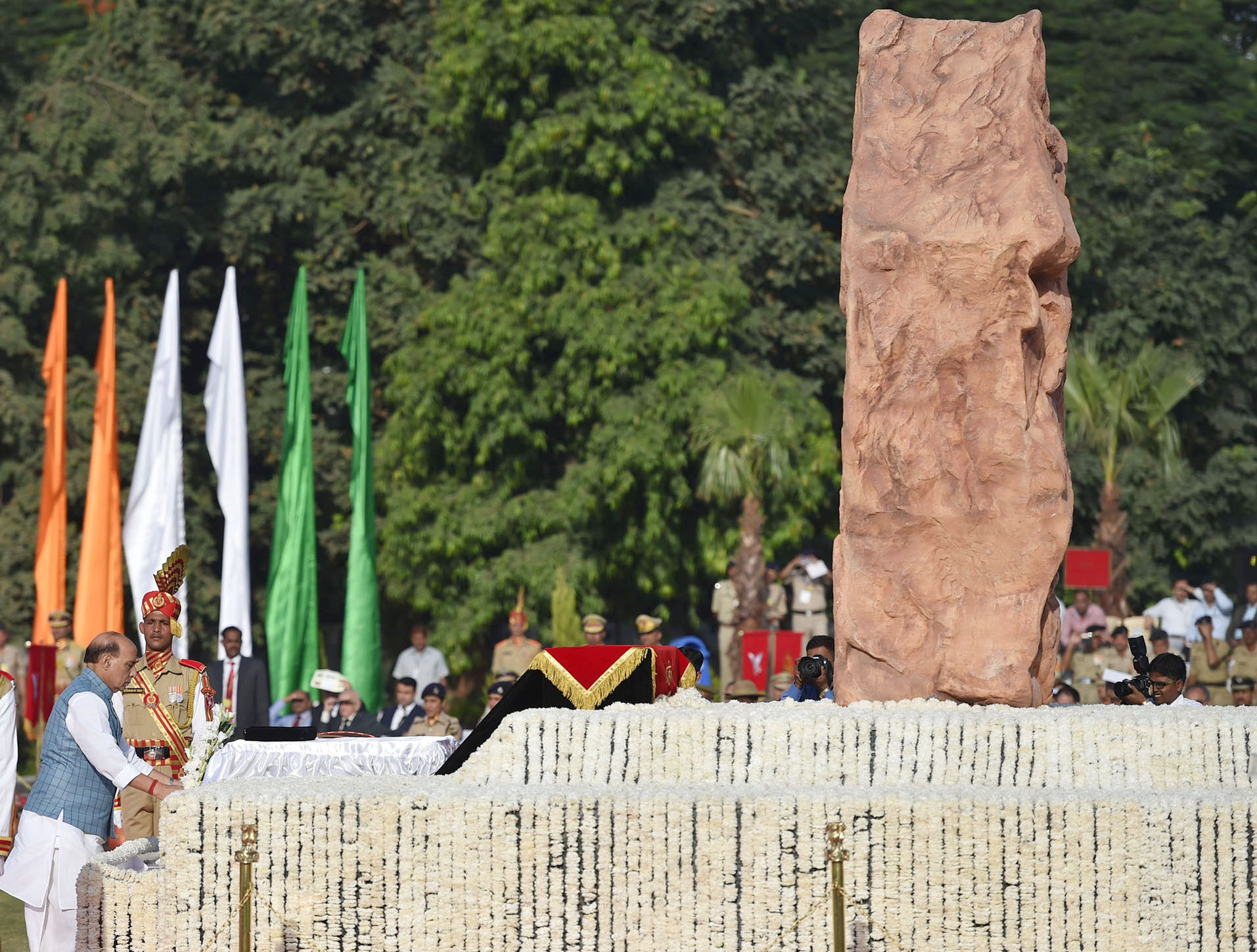
The Union Home Minister Rajnath Singh laying wreath at the Police Memorial, on the occasion of the Police Commemoration Day Parade, in New Delhi on 21 October 2016

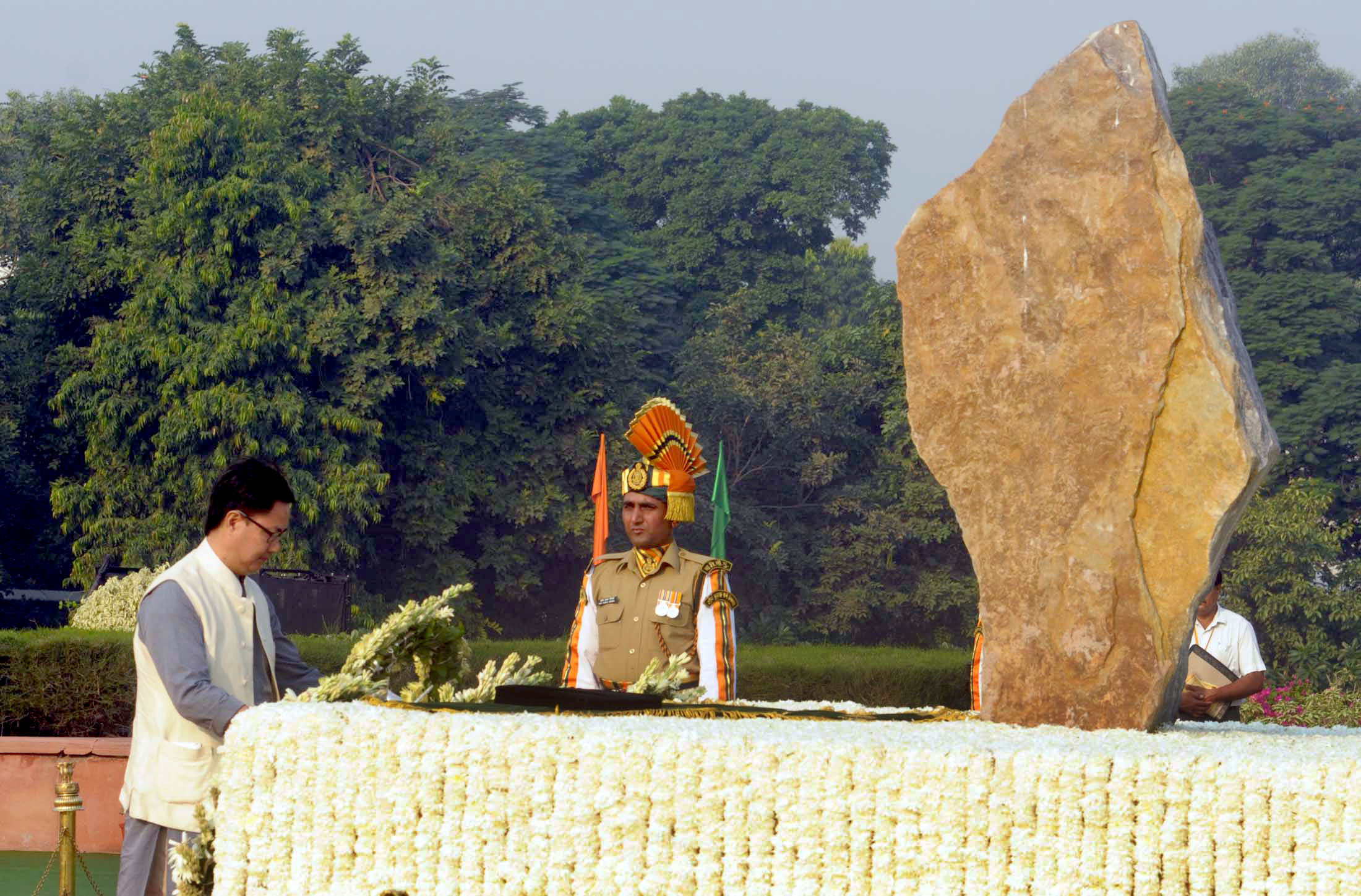
The Minister of State for Home Affairs, Kiren Rijiju laying wreath at the Police Memorial, on the occasion of the Police Commemoration Day Parade, in New Delhi on 21 October 2014

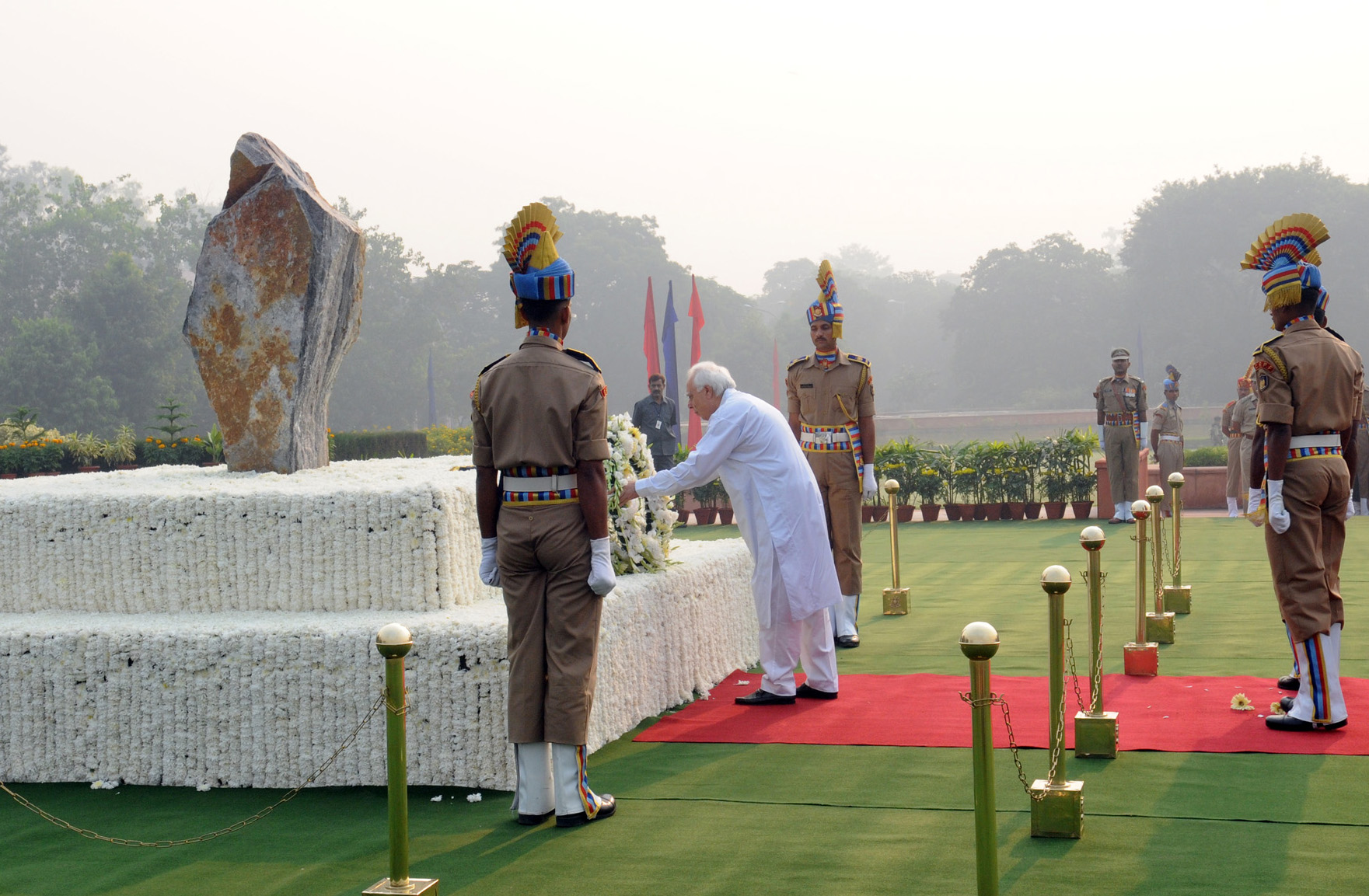
Kapil Sibal laying a wreath at the Police Memorial, on the occasion of the Police Commemoration Day Parade, in New Delhi on 21 October 2012

== Structures ==
=== Memorial ===
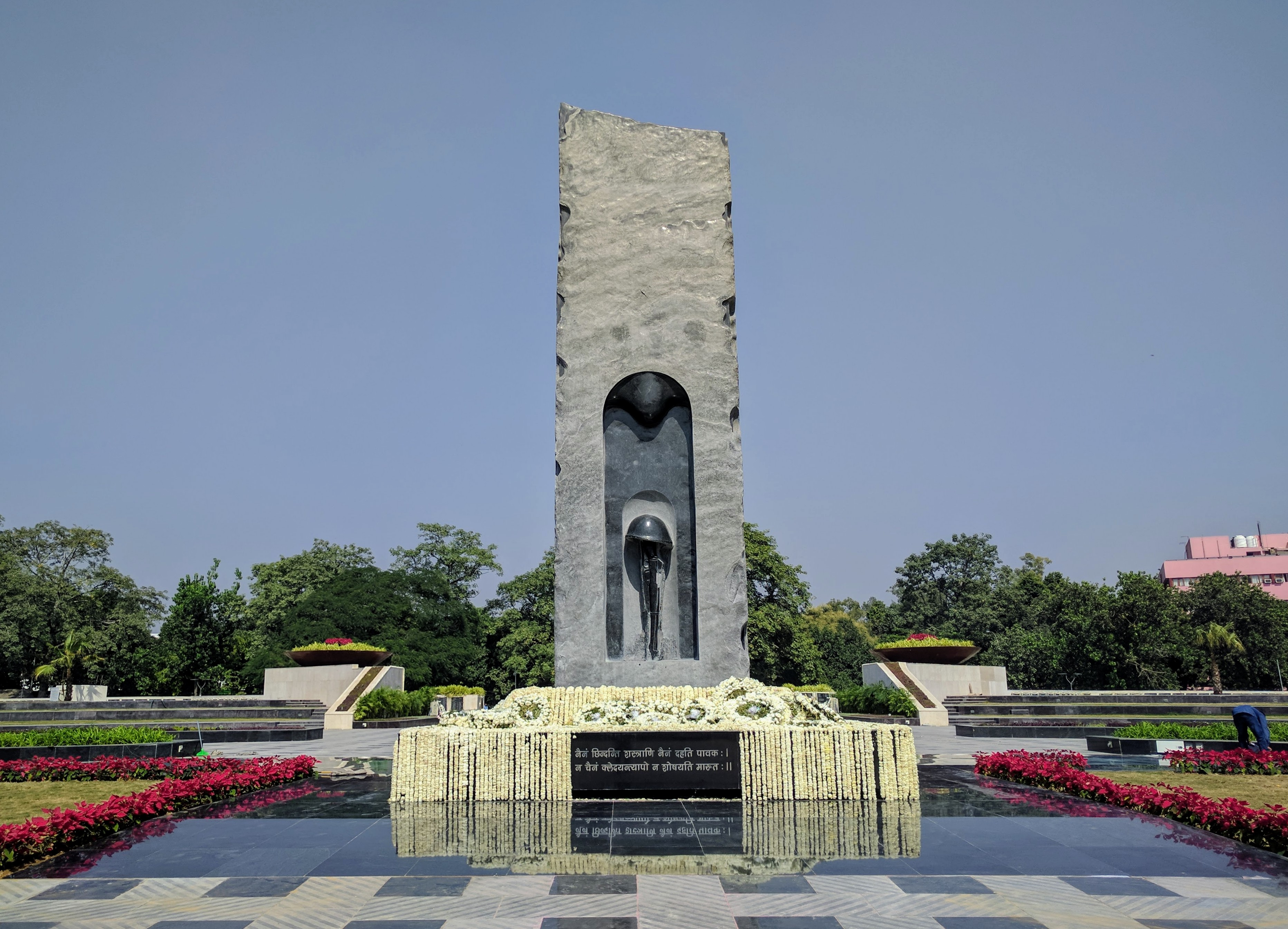
The central structure at the National Police Memorial

The central sculpture is a 30 ft (9 m) monolith made of a slab of granite weighing 238 tonnes. The weight and colour "symbolise the gravitas and solemnity of the supreme sacrifice". At the base of the structure, a 60 ft (18 m) river represents the continuous self-service of the police personnel in carrying out their duties. The central memorial sculpture has been designed by Adwaita Gadanayak. The stone comes from Khammam in Telangana.

=== Wall of Valour ===
Designed as part of the overall design scheme by architect Uday Bhat the names of all the 34,844 personnel who died in the line of duty from 1947 to present day are engraved on the granite, including 424 who died in 2018.

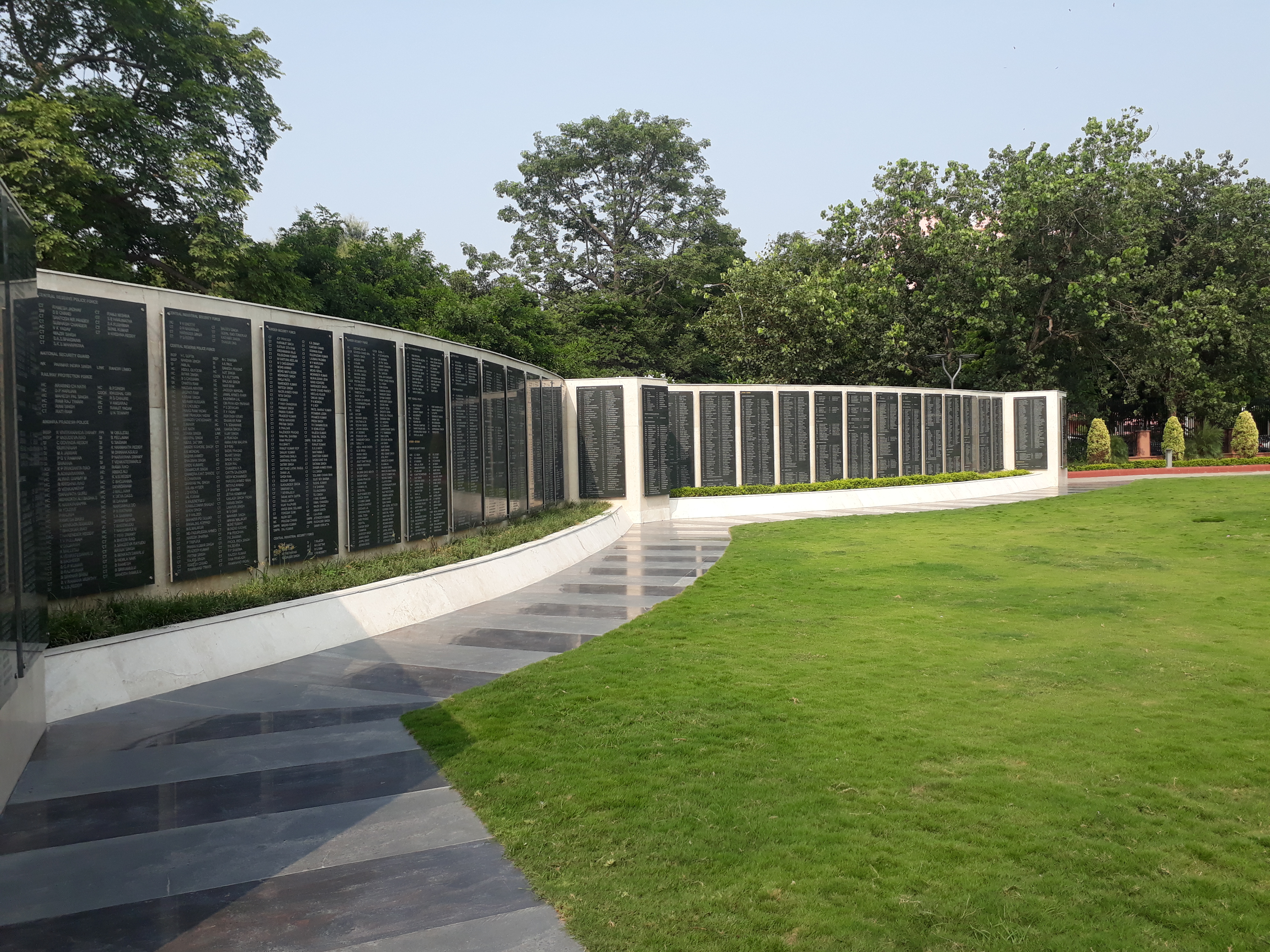
One section of the Wall of Valour

== National Police Museum ==
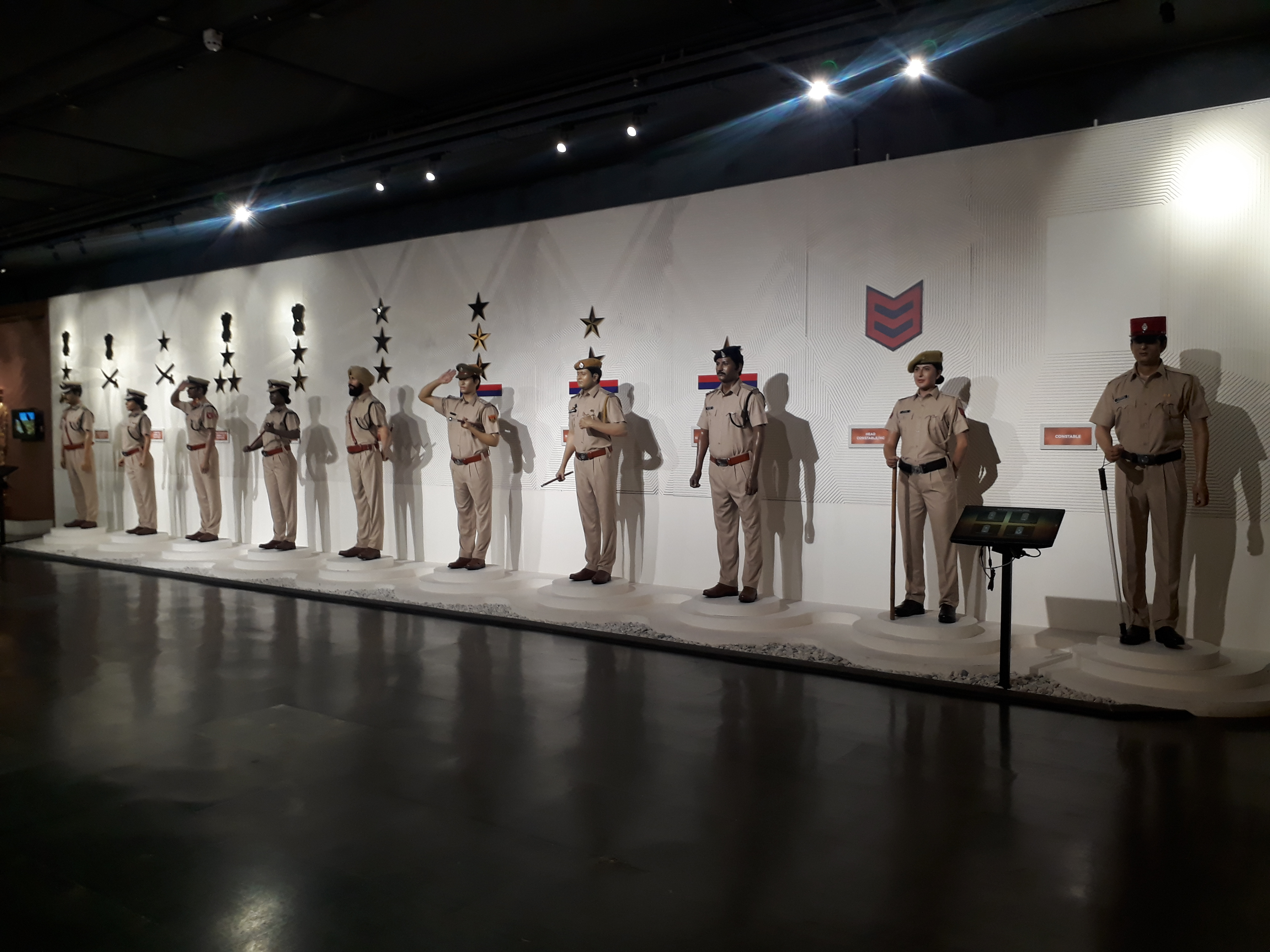
Statues of National Police Memorial

The National Police Memorial Museum is the first of its kind in India. The museum is underground and consists of five galleries over 1600 square meters. There are sections dedicated for various central and state police forces in India including Central Industrial Security Force, Special Protection Group, National Security Guard, Railway Protection Force, Bureau of Civil Aviation Security, Central Reserve Police Force and Intelligence Bureau. Police forces from all 28 states and 8 Union territories are presented, including special mention for women squads, police bands and animal squads (camel, dog and pigeon post). The role of police research organisations have also been mentioned such as the Bureau of Police Research and Development, the National Institute of Criminology and Forensic Science and the National Technical Research Organisation.

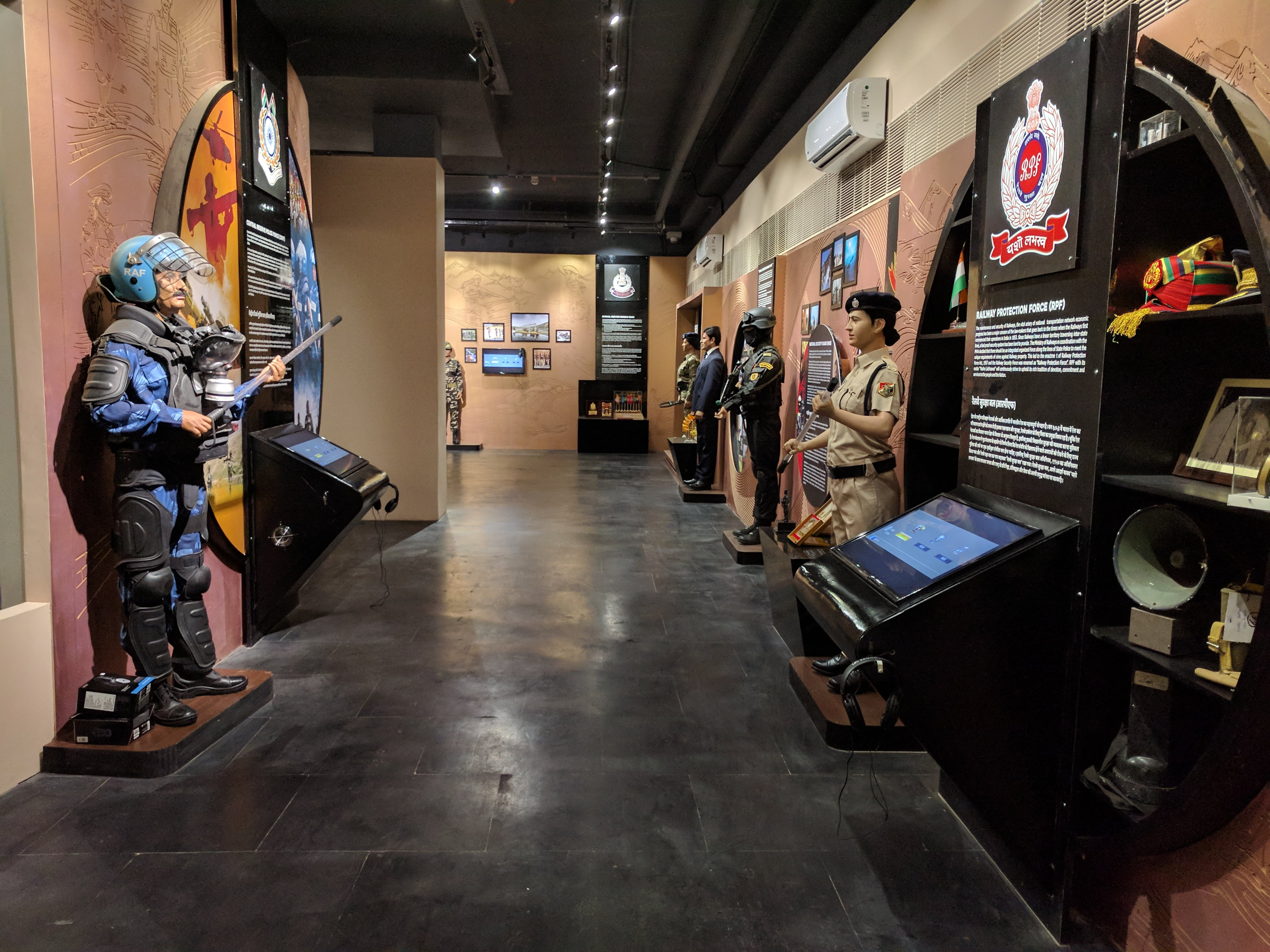
One exhibit at the National Police Memorial and Museum. The Railway Protection Force on the near right is one of the various police forces represented.

The martyrdom and stories section includes Operation Vajra Shakti (2002), Operation Puttur (2013), the killing of Veerappan (2004), and the death of Vandana Malik (1989) - the first female Indian Police Service officer killed in the line of duty, and various other stories.

== See also ==
- Amar Jawan Jyoti in New Delhi
- India Gate in New Delhi
- National Military Memorial in Bengaluru
- National War Memorial Southern Command in Pune
- Kargil Vijay Diwas
- Vijay Diwas (India)
- Bijoy Dibos
