= Arun Yogiraj =

Indian sculptor (born 1983)

Dr. Arun Yogiraj
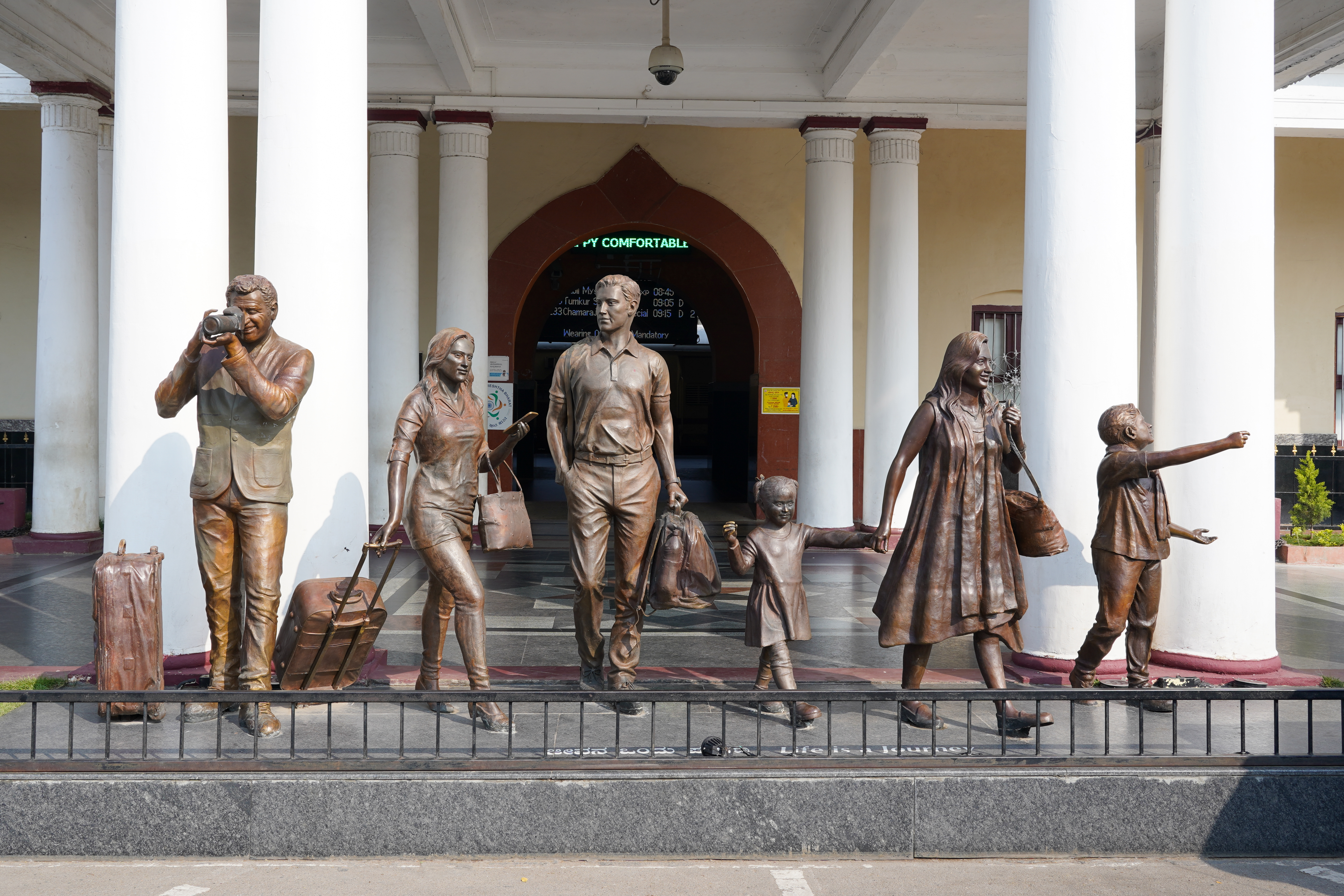
- Bronze statues of travelers by Arun Yogiraj
- Born: 15 December 1983 (age 42); Mysore, Karnataka, India
- Occupations: Sculptor, Artist
- Notable work: Ram Lalla Idol at Ayodhya's Ram Mandir; Statue of Adi Shankaracharya in Kedarnath; Netaji Subhash Chandra Bose Statue at India Gate New Delhi; A 21-feet tall Hanuman statue at Chunchanakatte in Mysore district; A 15-feet tall sculpture of B.R. Ambedkar
- Spouse: Vijetha Mohan
- Awards: Rajyothsava Award by Government of Karnataka
- Website: arunyogiraj.com

Arun Yogiraj (born 15 December 1983) is an Indian sculptor from Mysuru, Karnataka. He belongs to Vishwakarma Brahmin community. He has carved the 30-feet statue of Subhash Chandra Bose, which was installed in the canopy behind the Amar Jawan Jyoti at the India Gate in New Delhi ahead of the 125th birth anniversary of Netaji Subhash Chandra Bose. His idol of Ram Lalla, the child form of Hindu god Rama, is also installed at Ayodhya's Ram Temple.

== Early life and education ==
Yogiraj was born into a family of traditional sculptors in Mysore, Karnataka. He belongs to Vishwabrahmin community. Arun Yogiraj married Vijetha Mohan, and they have a daughter and a son. His grandfather was a national awardee honored by the president of India in 1983, and his father was a state award-winning sculptor.

He studied at JSS Balajagath School in Mysore, then completed his BCom and MBA from the University of Mysore. Though he briefly worked in the corporate world, he decided in 2008 to return to his roots and pursue sculpting full-time.

== Career ==
Yogiraj's career was shaped by both tradition and innovation. In 2011, he began focusing on hyper-realistic sculpting, expanding his knowledge by interacting with international sculptors and studying anatomy and structure.

A major milestone in his career was the successful sculpting of a 15-foot marble statue of Maharaja Jayachamarajendra Wadiyar. The statue received praise from the then Chief Minister of Karnataka in 2015, who noted that the sculpture “looked alive.”

Yogiraj works primarily in the Mysore style of sculpture, an evolution of the Hoysala architectural method. To date, he has completed over 10,000 sculptures of varying sizes and styles.

== Works ==
Yogiraj's recent works include the statue of Ram Lalla. The 51 inch tall idol has been installed in the Ram Mandir at Ayodhya.

His other works include a 12-feet, tall 3-D statue of Adi Shankaracharya in Kedarnath, the 21-feet tall Hanuman statue at Chunchanakatte in Mysore district, 15-feet tall sculpture of Dr. BR Ambedkar, in Mysuru inaugurated by the then chief minister of Karnataka Siddaramaiah in 2018, the white amritashila statue of Swami Ramakrishna Paramahamsa in Mysore, six-feet monolithic statue of Nandi and a six-feet tall statue of Banashankari Devi. The 14.5-feet tall white amritashila (marble) statue of the Jayachamarajendra Wodeyar which was unveiled in 2016, the Raja of Mysore is one of the famous of his works along with the 5-feet bust of Nalwadi Krishnaraja Wadiyar.

Selected Works
Work Name	Location	Year
Ram Lalla Idol	Ayodhya Ram Mandir	2024
Netaji Subhash Chandra Bose Statue	India Gate, New Delhi	2022
Adi Shankaracharya Statue	Kedarnath	2021
Amarnath Nandi	Jammu and Kashmir	—
Sangolli Rayanna Statue (12 ft, bronze)	Mysore	—
Ramakrishna Paramahamsa Statue (10 ft)	Mysore	—
Dr. B. R. Ambedkar Statue (15 ft, marble)	Mysore	—
Mahatma Gandhi Statue (25 ft)	Vidhana Soudha, Bengaluru	—

== Awards ==
- Karnataka Rajyotsava award in 2024.
