= Statue of Subhas Chandra Bose =

Statue in India Gate, New Delhi

Subhas Chandra Bose Statue
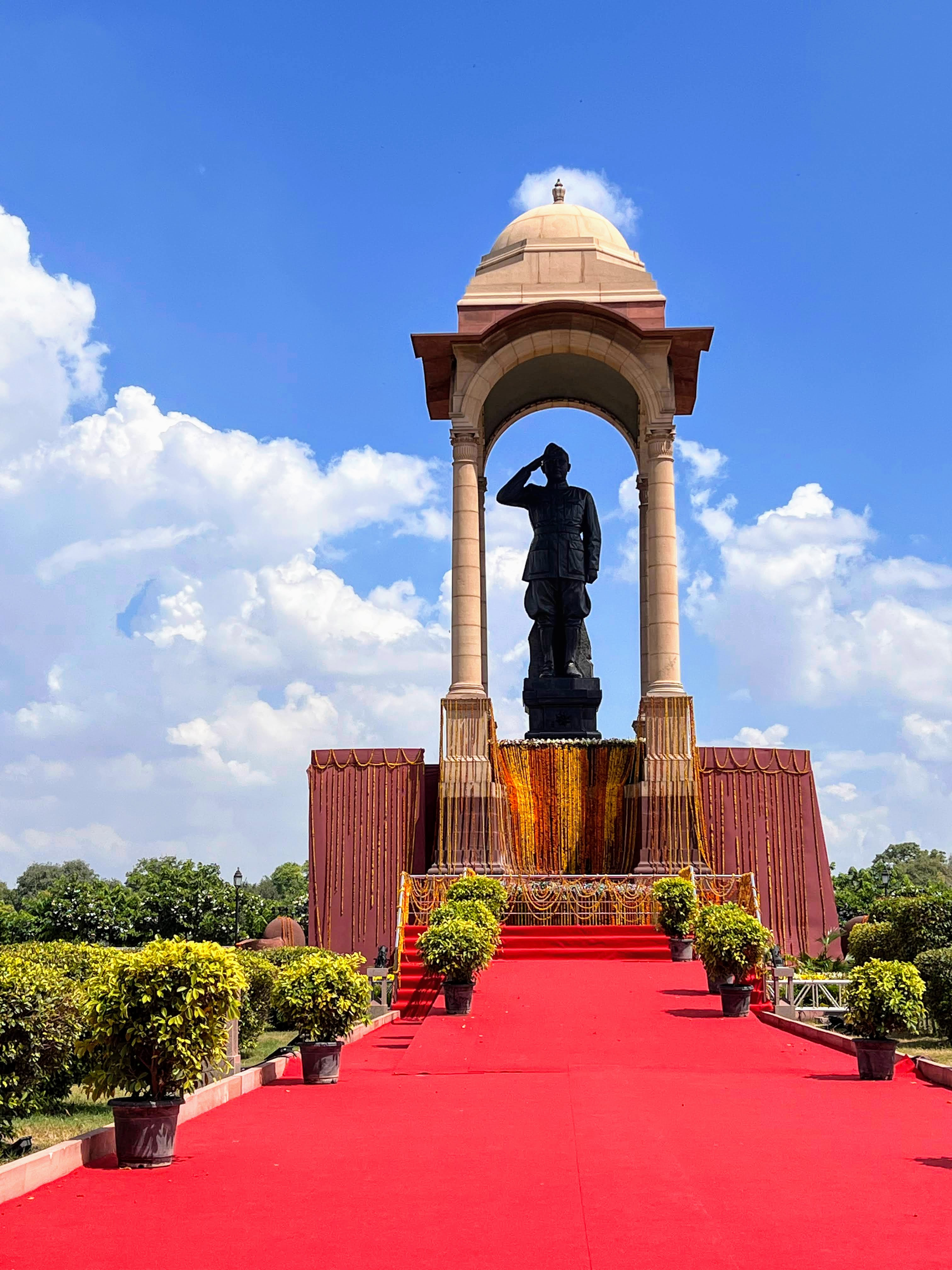
- Interactive map of Subhas Chandra Bose Statue
- Location: India Gate, New Delhi, India
- Coordinates: 28.6128793°N 77.2311301°E
- Designer: Arun Yogiraj
- Type: statue
- Material: Granite
- Length: 10 ft (3.0 m)
- Width: 8 ft (2.4 m)
- Height: 28 ft (8.5 m)
- Beginning date: 2021
- Opening date: 8 September 2022; 4 years ago
- Dedicated to: Netaji Subhas Chandra Bose

The statue of Subhas Chandra Bose, also known as the Netaji's Statue, is a monolithic statue made of black granite, dedicated to Netaji Subhas Chandra Bose, commander-in-chief of the Axis-aligned Indian National Army. The statue 28 feet (8.5 m) in total height, including a 8 feet (2.4 m) in total width. It is placed under the canopy behind India Gate in Delhi. The statue was sculpted by Mysuru-based sculptor Arun Yogiraj, whose other prominent works include the statue of Adi Shankaracharya in Kedarnath. Prominent attendees at the dedication ceremony in 2022 included PM Narendra Modi, members of his cabinet, MP Hardeep Singh Puri, G. Kishan Reddy and Arjun Ram Meghwal.

== History ==
=== Background ===
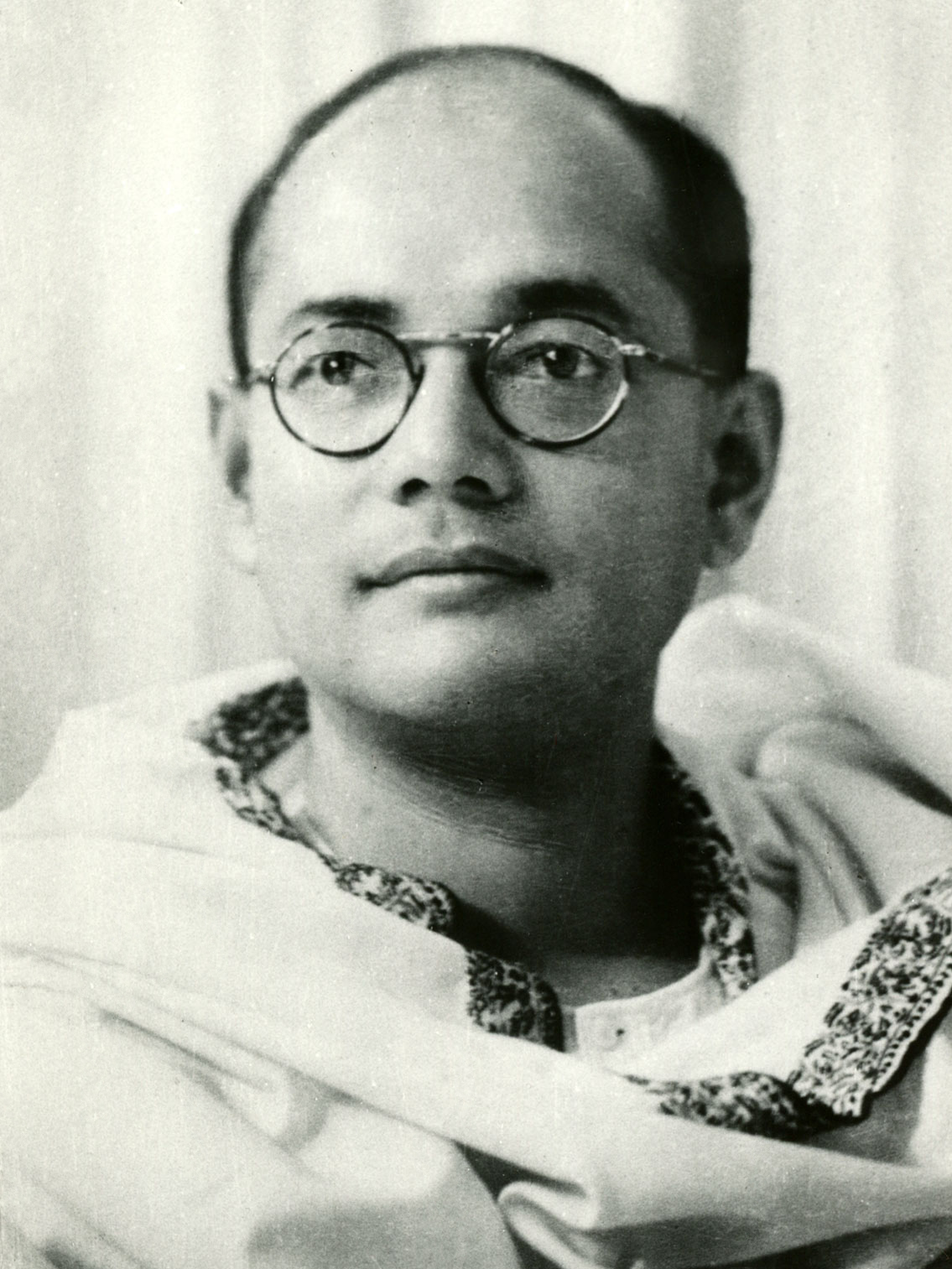
Subhas Chandra Bose c. 1930s

Subhas Chandra Bose was an Indian nationalist who served as a 2nd leader of Indian National Army and head of the Provisional Government of Free India. First, joined the National Congress and was elected twice as president, he later forming the All India Forward Bloc. In 1941, Subhash Chandra Bose was put under house arrest by the British government. During this time the CID kept his house under surveillance. However, he managed to escape to Germany via Afghanistan and the Soviet Union. Later he arrived in Singapore from Germany. In 1943, Subhash Chandra Bose revived the idea of forming an army for independence. At a meeting held in Singapore in July, Rasbihari Bose handed over control of the Indian Independence League to Subhash Chandra Bose. Subhash Chandra Bose was able to reorganize the army and mobilize widespread support among the Indian diaspora in Southeast Asia.

In 1936, a statue of King-Emperor George V was installed on the canopy of India Gate. The statue stood in its original location for two decades after the country's independence in 1947, but some political parties increasingly objected to its continued presence in its central location, especially after the tenth anniversary of independence and the centenary of the Indian Rebellion of 1857. Others, including India's first prime minister Jawaharlal Nehru, objected to removing colonial-era statues, Nehru arguing that they reflected an integral part of India's history. On the night of 12–13 August 1958, George V's royal insignia and the Tudor crown above the canopy were removed.

With increasing pressure from socialist members of Parliament, then Deputy Home Minister Lalit Narayan Mishra said in May 1964 that all British statues would be removed from the national capital by 1966. Two days before Independence Day in 1965, members of the Samyukta Socialist Party overpowered two constables guarding the site, beating one and knocking the other unconscious, tarred the statue and mutilated its royal crown, nose and one ear, leaving a picture of Subhash Chandra Bose on the monument. This vandalism was widely condemned by India's English-language press. Finally, in late 1968, the statue was removed from its position under the canopy. The statue of the Emperor is now located in Coronation Park, Delhi.

Indian Prime Minister Narendra Modi announced the construction of the statue of Subhas Chandra Bose in 2021. He said that the statue would be installed in the canopy of India Gate to mark 'Azadi Ka Amrit Mahotsav', commemorating 75 years of independence as well as Bose's 125th birth anniversary.

=== Dedication ===
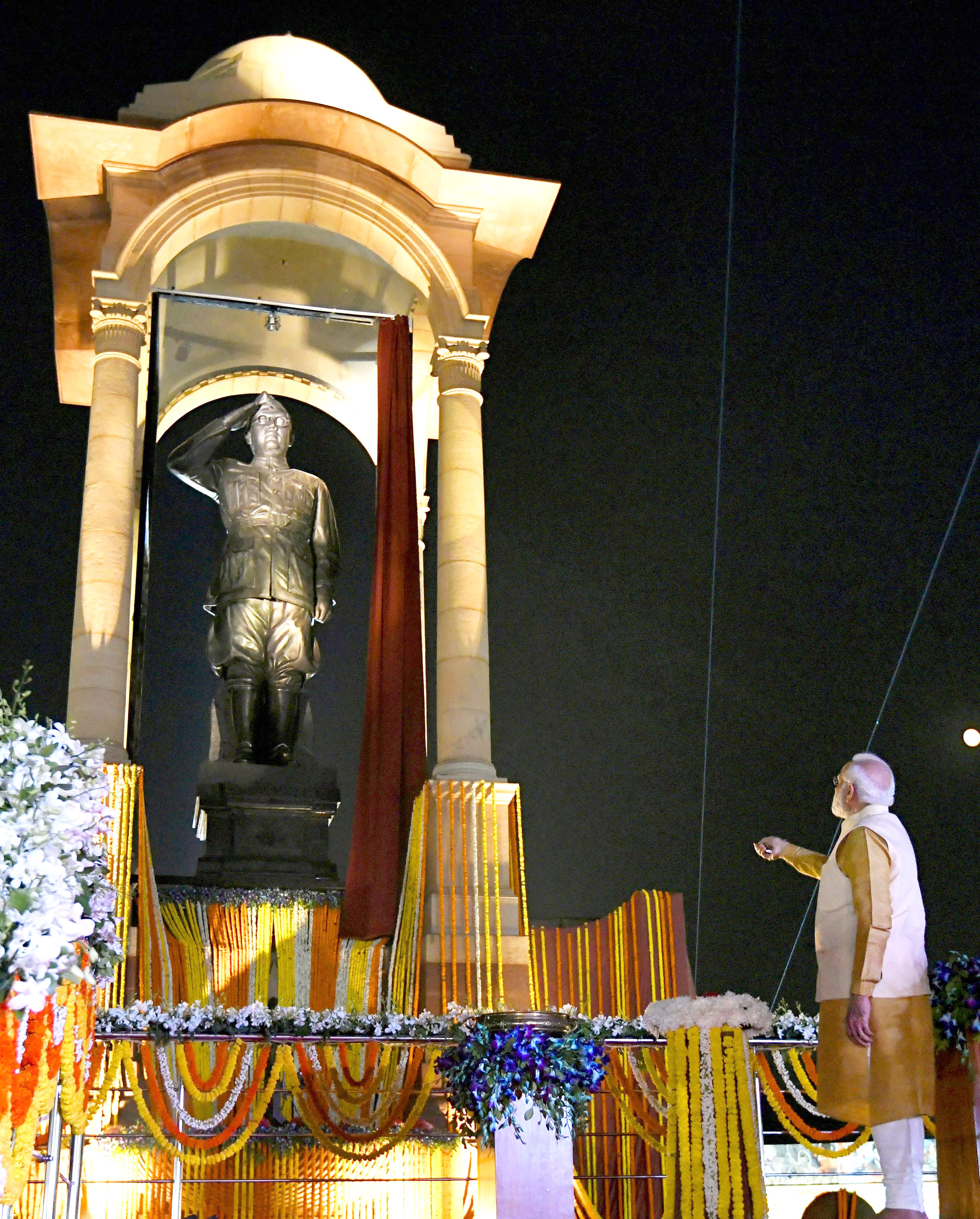
The Prime Minister, Narendra Modi unveils the statue of Netaji Subhas Chandra Bose at India Gate.

On 23 January 2022, Subhas Chandra Bose's hologram statue was installed on the occasion of 'Parakram Diwas'. The hologram statue of Subhas Chandra Bose was unveiled by the Prime Minister Narendra Modi.

The statue was formally dedicated on 8 September 2022. Prime Minister Narendra Modi dedicated the statue of Netaji Subhas Chandra Bose to the nation near India Gate in New Delhi. In the inauguration ceremony, the Prime Minister said, "Today the Rajpath ceases to exist and has become a Kartavya Path. Today when the statue of Netaji has replaced the mark of the statue of George V, then this is not the first example of the abandonment of slavery mentality. This is neither the beginning nor the end. It is a continuous journey of determination till the goal of freedom of mind and spirit is achieved."

== Design and construction ==
=== Design ===
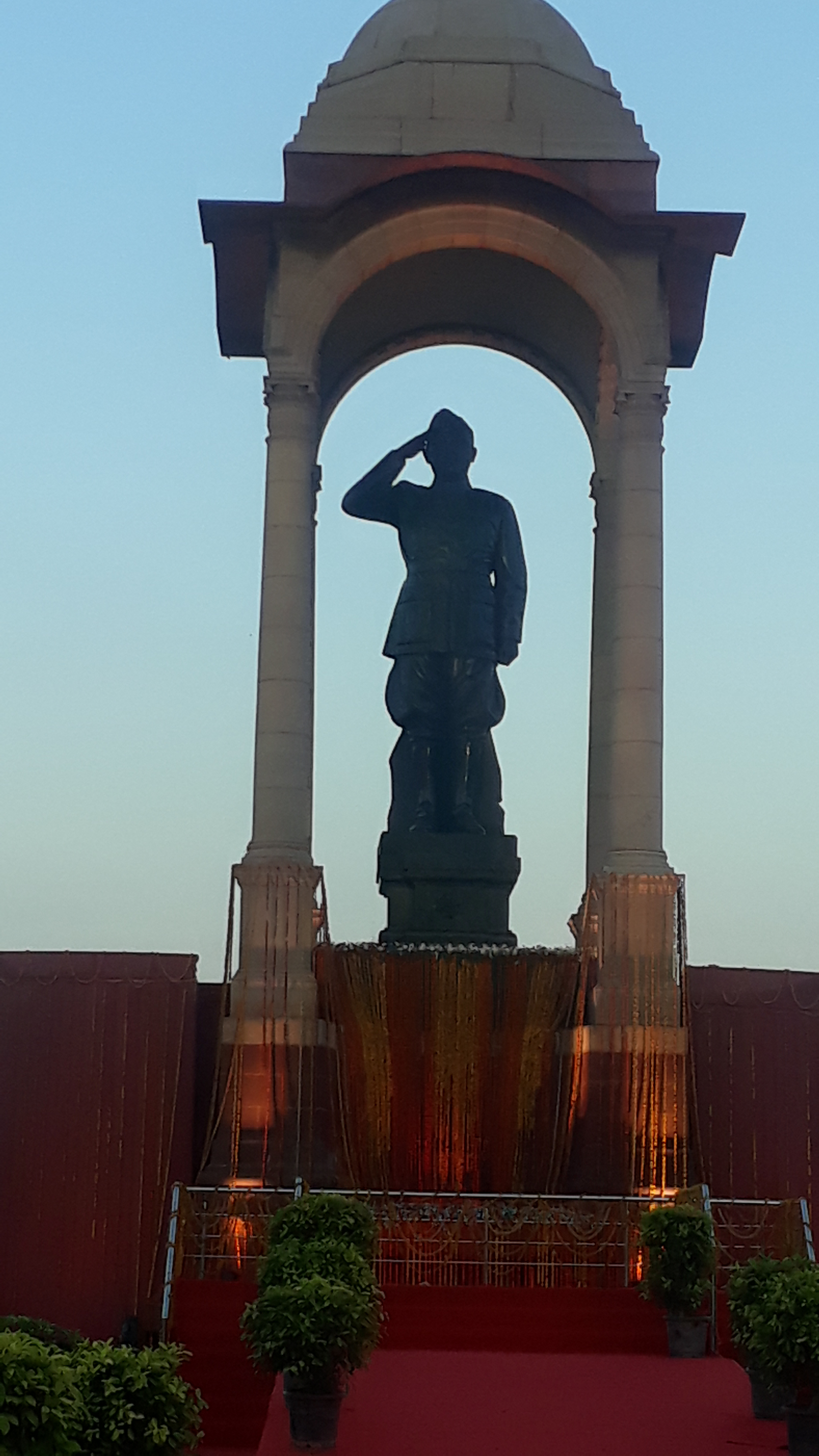
The Statue of Netaji Subhas Chandra Bose at India Gate Canopy

The statue is sited in the center of C-hexagon, and it is surrounded by India Gate, Param Vir Memorial, National War Memorial and Children's Park. The statue is in a canopy, and the canopy is situated in a water body. There are fountains in the water body.

The black granite statue measures 28 ft (8.5 m) tall, 10 ft (3.0 m) long, and 8 ft (2.4 m) wide. It weighs approximately 65 Tn (65,000 kg). Subhas Chandra Bose is depicted as a commander of the Indian National Army, wearing his military uniform; A long belted jacket, boots and a hat. He is standing in the posture of salute.

=== Construction ===
A large black granite stone was selected for the statue and brought from Telangana to Delhi. The 280 metric tonne granite block was quarried from a quarry in Khammam, Telangana. A temporary road had to be built to transport the stone from the quarry to the highway. A 100-feet long truck with 140 wheels was specially designed to transport it to the National Gallery of Modern Art (NGMA) in the national capital. The granite block traveled from Khammam to Nagpur, then traveled through Maharashtra's other parts, Madhya Pradesh and Uttar Pradesh to reach Faridabad in Haryana. Finally reached NGMA, Delhi. A team of sculptors from Granite Studio India spent a total of 26,000 man-hours of intense artistic effort to bring the statue to life. The entire sculpting work was done at NGMA. The statue is a completely handcrafted sculpture using traditional techniques and modern tools. The statue was designed by a team under the Ministry of Culture led by Sculptor Arun Yogiraj.

== Gallery ==
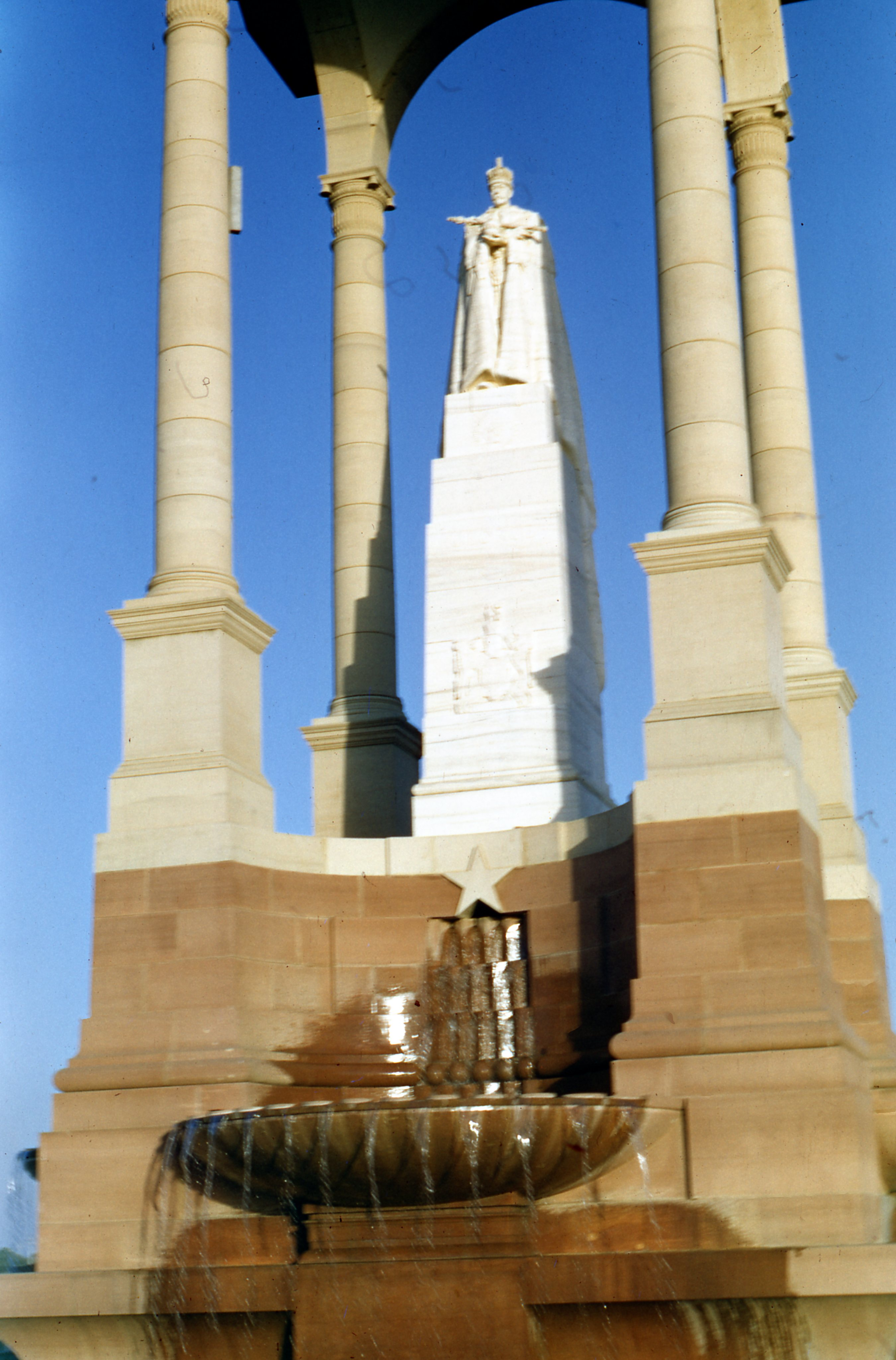
King George V's statue at India Gate in 1952

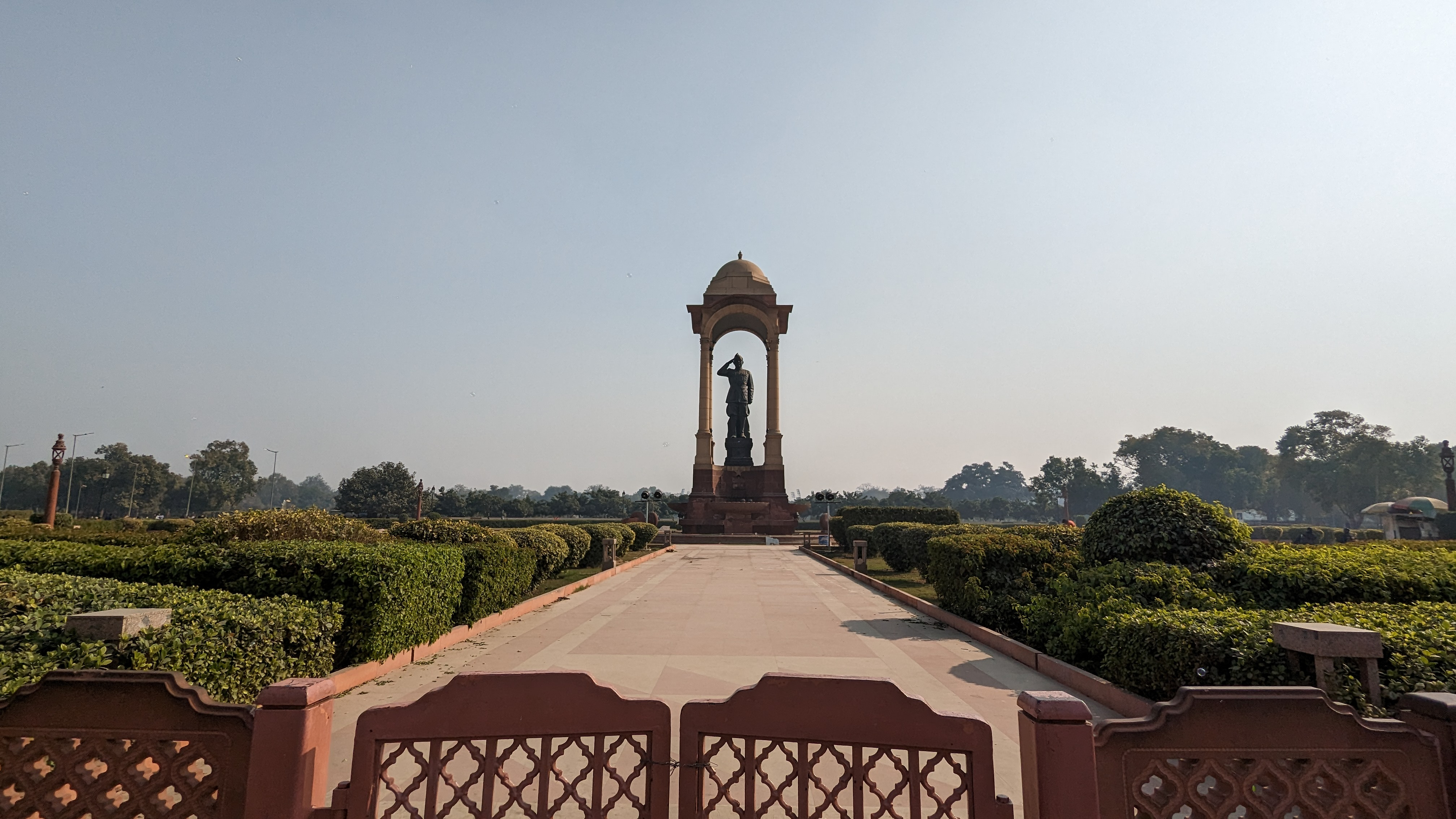
Netaji statue, seen from the India Gate in 2023

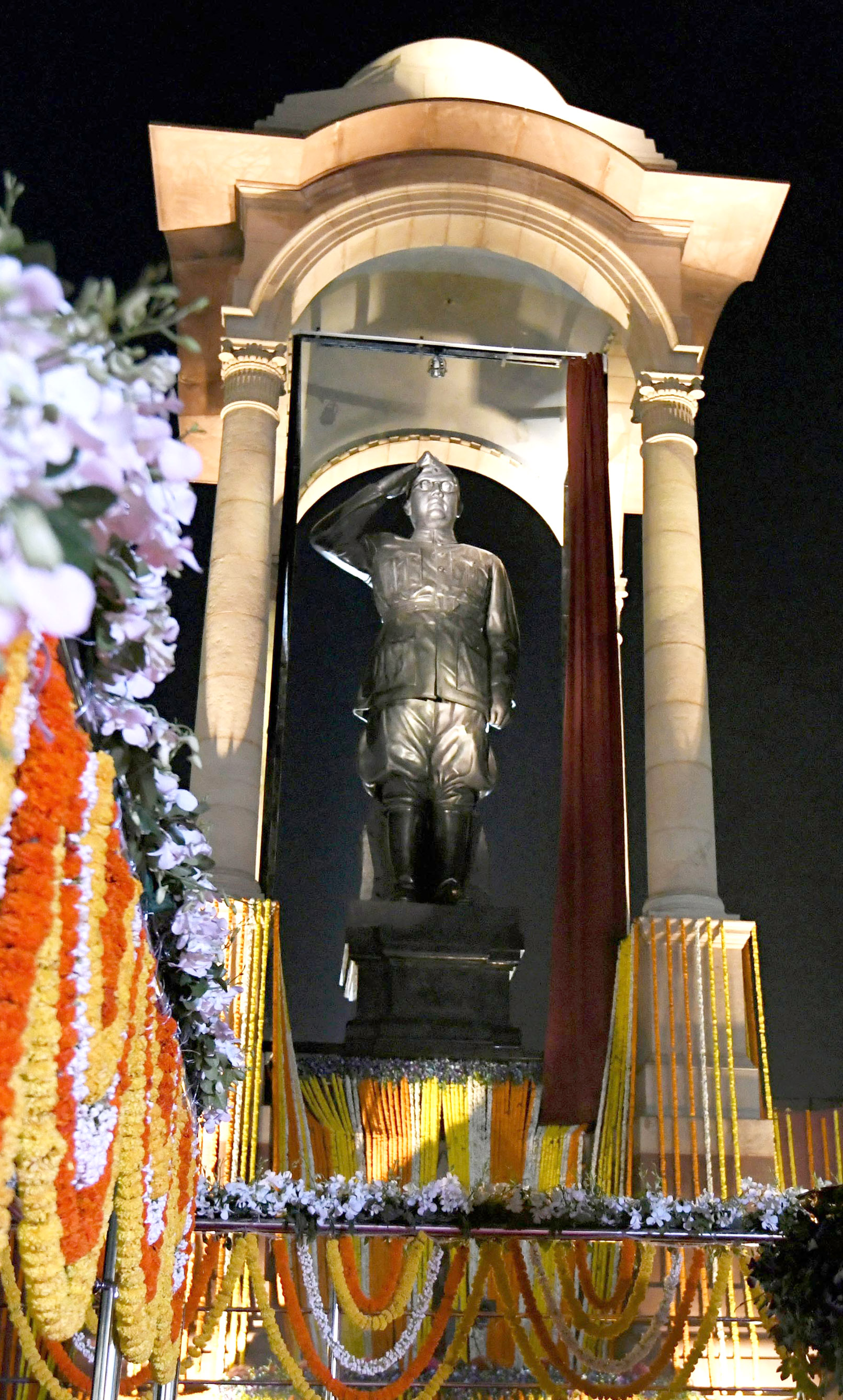
Netaji statue, as dedicated on 8 September 2022

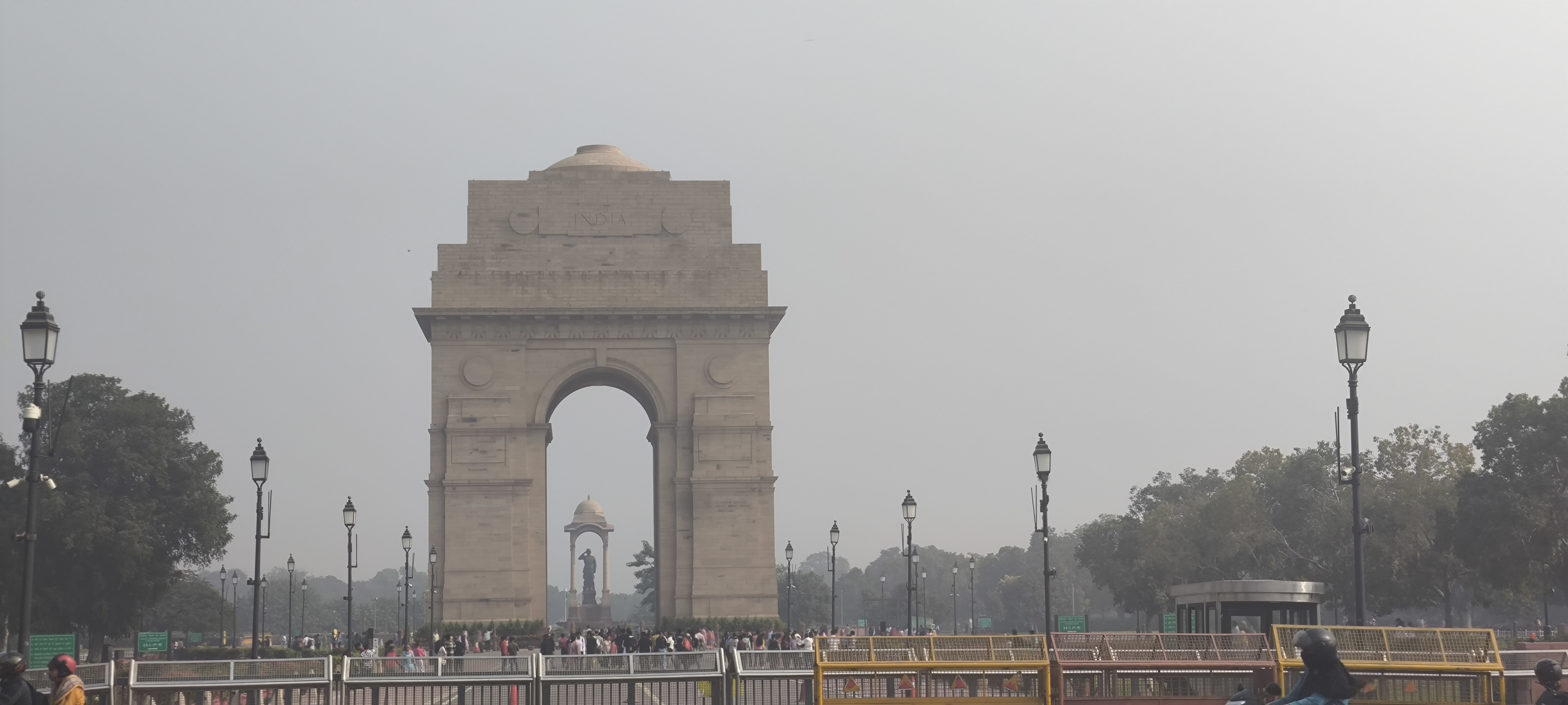
India Gate and Statue of Subhas Chandra Bose in 2025

== See also ==
- Subhas Chandra Bose statue (Shyambazar, Kolkata)

== Sources ==
- Loiwal, Manogya (18 January 2017a), President Pranab Mukherjee unveils Netaji Subhash Chandra Bose's 1937 Wanderer W24 in Kolkata, India Today, archived from the original on 15 May 2017
- Loiwal, Manogya (19 January 2017b), "Netaji Subhash Chandra Bose's favourite car restored; unveiled in Kolkata", India Today, archived from the original on 3 January 2018
- Markandeya, Subodh (1990), Subhas Chandra Bose: Netaji's passage to im[m]ortality, Arnold Publishers, ISBN 978-81-7031-241-3, archived from the original on 12 July 2023
- Padhy, K.S. (2011), Indian Political Thought, PHI Learning Pvt. Ltd., ISBN 978-81-203-4305-4
- Talwar, Bhagat Ram (1976), The Talwars of Pathan Land and Subhas Chandra's Great Escape, People's Publishing House, ISBN 978-0-88386-848-5, archived from the original on 12 July 2023
