= Subhas Chandra Bose statue (Shyambazar, Kolkata) =

Statue by Nagesh Yoglekar in Kolkata, India

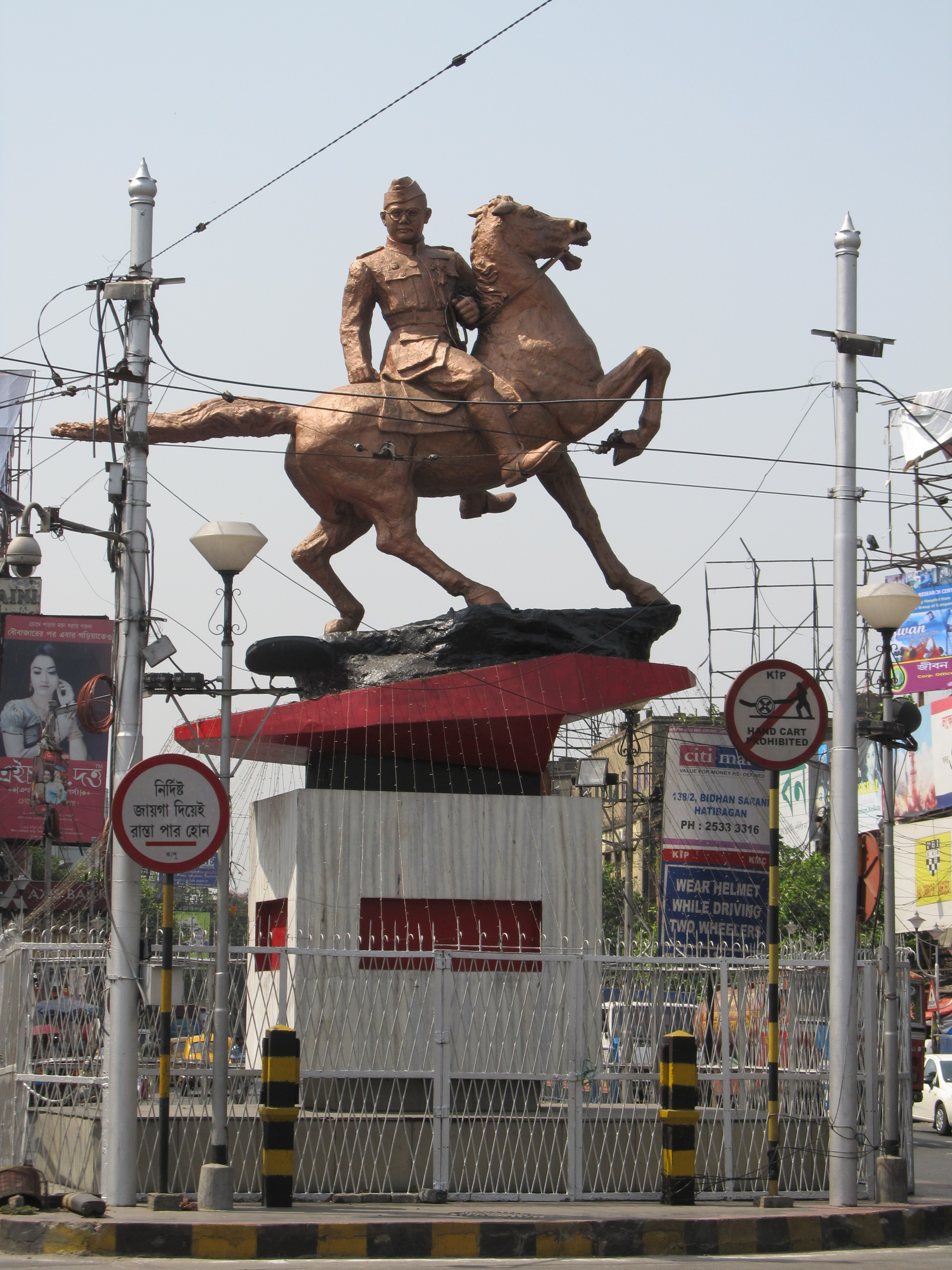
- Artist: Nagesh Yawalkar
- Year: 1969
- Type: Statue
- Location: Kolkata; 22°36′06″N 88°22′25″E
- Owner: Kolkata Municipal Corporation

The Subhas Chandra Bose statue located in Shyambazar five point crossing is one of the most important statues and landmarks in Kolkata. The statue was sculpted by Nagesh Yoglekar and was unveiled by Kolkata Municipal Corporation in 1969.

== History ==
The statue was sculpted by Nagesh Yoglekar and was unveiled by Kolkata Municipal Corporation in 1969. In 2008, during a project initiated by Hooghly River Bridge Commissioners (HRBC), this statue and its surrounding area were beautified. At this time the statue was painted and illuminated by two lamp posts.

== Description ==
The statue depicts Bose, wearing military attire seated on a horse with one leg up. The statue itself acts as an important visual landmark for the local community to aid in navigation.

== See also ==
- Statue of Subhas Chandra Bose
