= Emirates Draw Games =

Emirati lottery draw organization

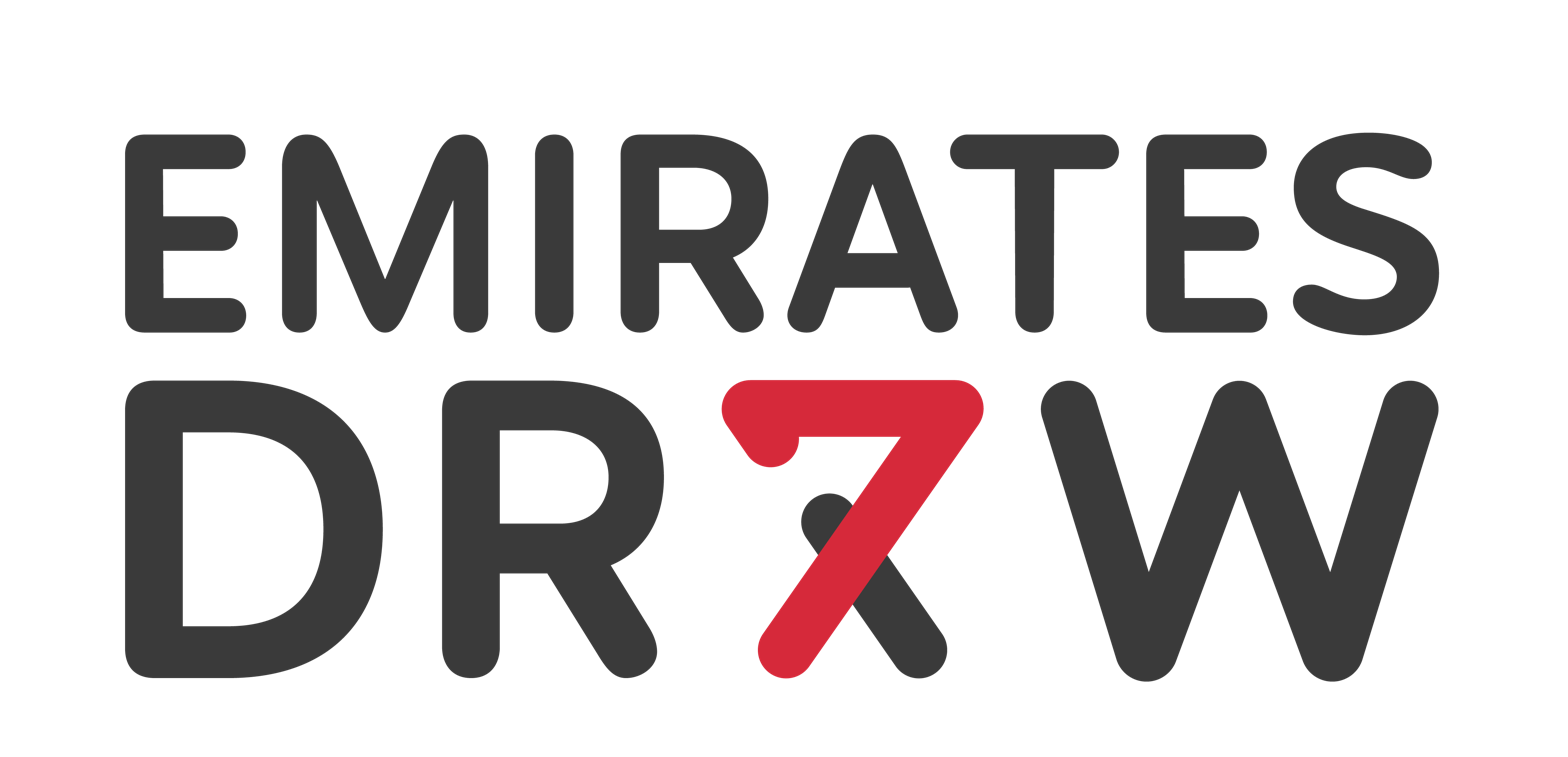
- Formation: September 2021
- Type: Drawing Games
- Headquarters: Dubai, UAE
- Owner: Tycheros Limited
- Website: emiratesdraw.com

Emirates Draw is a non-gambling and global online lottery draw, operated and managed by Tycheros Limited, a company in the UAE, with prizes up to $30 million. Its name is a misnomer as it operates from outside Emirates / UAE and has no connection with Emirates.

== History ==
Emirates Draw games is a gaming platform. It provides hourly and weekly games, as well as limited-ticket raffles.

In 2021, Emirates Draw games received an accolade from the Children Cancer Center of Lebanon (CCCL) for its support and contributions.

In 2022, Emirates Draw games served as the Official Sponsor of the GCC Basketball Championship Qualifier for the FIBA Asian Cup.

The organization also received an accolade and certificate from SAAED for its support to the Zayed Humanitarian Day.

In 2023, it was honored with a Guinness World Record certificate for supporting the "Our Responsibility is Your Protection" campaign, an initiative led by the Emirates Society for Consumer Protection with Emirates Draw as its official sponsor.

== Activities ==
Emirates Draw restored over 18,000 coral polyps along the coastline of the UAE expanding the coral region by 8,500 square meters.

Emirates Draw is an official sponsor of the 'Our Responsibility to Protect' initiative, led by the Emirates Society for Consumer Protection.
