= UAE Golden Visa =

Emirati visa for investors

The Golden Visa is a travel visa invoked by the government of the United Arab Emirates in 2019, under Cabinet Resolution No.56 of Organization of Residence Permits for Investors, Entrepreneurs and Professional Talent, 2018. The visa is different to other residence visas.

The UAE Golden Visa costs US$136,000 for investors. Valid for a period of 5 to 10 years with an automatic renewal option, the visa is designed to further the UAE's diversification efforts, diminishing reliance on oil while enhancing industries such as technology, education, and healthcare. According to the government, this program is in harmony with the UAE's objective to establish itself as a premier international center for business and skilled professionals.

In 2025, the Golden visa underwent a number of changes. The visa is valid for 5 years if the applicant has acquired a property in Dubai worth at least 2 million AED, it is renewable as long as certain conditions are met.

== See also ==
- Immigrant investor programs
