= List of Kannada films of the 1930s =

This is a list of Kannada feature films released by the Kannada film Industry located in Bangalore, Karnataka in the 1930s.

== Top-grossing films ==
Rank	Year	Title	Collection	Ref.
1.	1936	Samsara Nauka	₹4 lakh (₹46.2 crore in 2025)	
2.	1935	Sadarame	₹2 lakh (₹33.09 crore in 2025)	
3.	1934	Sati Sulochana	₹1.5 lakh (₹32.94 crore in 2025)	
4.	1932	Hari Maya	₹75 thousand (₹2.5 crore in 2025)	
5.	1937	Purandaradasa	₹50 thousand (₹10.98 crore in 2025)	

== Silent films ==
Year	Title	Director	Cast	Producer	Banner
1924	Vasantasena	Mohan Dayaram Bhavnani	Kamaladevi Chattopadhyay, TP Kailasam	TP Kailasam	Mysore Films
1927	Sri Kanyaka Parameshwari	M Surya	Subbaiah Naidu, R Nagendra Rao, Tripuramba, Lakshmi Bai	M Surya	Surya Films
1928	Raavana	R Nagendra Rao	Subbaiah Naidu, Singanalluru Puttaswamayya, Lakshmi Bai, R Nagendra Rao	Subbaiah Naidu	Sahitya Samrajya Nataka Mandali
1929	Sri Rama Pattabhisheka	H Gowrishankar	AN Sheshachar, TN Balakrishna, Singanalluru Puttaswamayya	H Gowrishankar	Lakshmasana Drama Company
1929	Bhakta Ambareesha	R Nagendra Rao	Subbaiah Naidu, R Nagendra Rao, Kamaladevi Chattopadhyay	Subbaiah Naidu	Sahitya Samrajya Nataka Mandali
1930	Pandava Nirvana	YV Rao	TS Mani, Devaki, Subbaiah Naidu	Gubbi Veeranna	Gubbi Film Company
1930	Pandava Ajnaatavaasa	YV Rao	Tara, TS Mani, Dhan Singh, Subbaiah Naidu	Subbaiah Naidu	Sahitya Samrajya Nataka Mandali
1930	Song of Life (Jeevana Gaana)	GB Pawar	Gubbi Veeranna, Lalitha Pawar	Gubbi Veeranna	Gubbi Film Company
1931	Mrcchakkatika	Mohan Dayaram Bhavnani	Kamaladevi Chattopadhyay, Y Rama Rao	Mohan Dayaram Bhavnani	Mysore Films
1931	Prameela Arjuna	S Gopalan	Tara, Vilochana, TS Mani	Gubbi Veeranna	Gubbi Film Company
1931	His Love Affair (Vichitra Prema)	Raphael Algoet	Gubbi Veeranna, B Jayamma, Subbaiah Naidu, HLN Simha	Gubbi Veeranna	Gubbi Film Company
1932	Devadasi	Mohan Dayaram Bhavnani	R Nagendra Rao, Tripuramba	Mohan Dayaram Bhavnani	Mysore Films
1932	Hari Maya	YV Rao	Gubbi Veeranna, B Jayamma, MV Rajamma, S Rajam	Gubbi Veeranna	Gubbi Film Company
1933	Dhruva Charitra	Gubbi Veeranna	TN Balakrishna, BR Panthulu, R Nagendra Rao, Gubbi Veeranna, Subbaiah Naidu	Gubbi Veeranna	Gubbi Film

== Talkies ==
Year	Title	Director	Cast	Music director	Producer	Banner
1934	Sati Sulochana	Y. V. Rao	R. Nagendra Rao, Tripuramba, Subbaiah Naidu, Lakshmi Bai, C. T. Sheshachalam	R. Nagendra Rao; H. R. Padmanabha Shastry	Chamanlal Doongaji	South India Movietone
1934	Bhakta Dhruva	Parshwanatha Altekar	Master Muthu, G. Nagesha Rao, T. Kanakalakshmamma, H. S. Krishnaswamy Iyengar	Harmonium Sheshagirirao	U. L. Narayana Rao	Jayavani Talkies
1935	Sadaarame	Raja Chandrashekar	Gubbi Veeranna, K.Ashwathamma, Muraaraachaar, Shakunthala, Swaranamma	Venkataramaiah (Papanna)	Gubbi Veeranna	Shakuntala Films
1936	Samsara Nauka	H. L. N. Simha	B. R. Panthulu, M. V. Rajamma, S. K. Padma Devi, M. S. Madhava Rao, Dikki Madhava Rao	M. Madhavarao	K. Nanjappa	Devi Films
1936	Chiranjeevi	K. P. Bhave	Devudu Narasimha Sastri, Sharada, Master Narayan, Malavalli Sundaramma, Basavaraju Mansoor, R. S. Murthy, Amirbai Karnataki	Harmonium Sheshagirirao		Canarese Talkies
1937	Purandaradasa	B. Chawan	G. Krishnaswamy Iyengar, Tripuraamba, J. T. Balakrishnarao,			Devi Films
1937	Rajasuya Yaaga	T.Dwarakanath	S. R. Vasudevarao, T. K. Ramamurhty, K. R. Seetharam, T. Jayamma, T. Chandrashekar, Saroja	Padmanabha Shashtri		Mysore Sound Studios

== See also ==
- Kannada cinema
