= Paes =

Paes is a surname of Portuguese origins. Notable people with the surname include:

- Bruno Paes (born 1982), Brazilian football player
- Carlos Paes (born 1978), Honduran footballer
- César Paes (born 1959), Franco-Brazilian filmmaker
- Cristiano Rogério Paes (born 1974), Brazilian bobsledder
- Dira Paes (born 1968), Brazilian actress
- Domingo Paes, Portuguese traveller
- Eduardo Paes (born 1969), Brazilian politician
- Fernanda Paes Leme (born 1983), Brazilian actress
- Fernando Paes (1907–1972), Portuguese equestrian
- Jennifer Paes (1949–2026), Indian basketball player
- José Paes (1946–2025), Ecuadorian footballer
- José Paulo Paes (1926–1998), Brazilian writer, poet and literary critic
- Júlia Paes (born 1986), Brazilian model and singer
- Juliana Paes (born 1979), Brazilian actress and former model
- Leander Paes (born 1973), Indian professional tennis player
- Lucas Paes (born 1997), Brazilian footballer
- Lutimar Paes (born 1988), Brazilian middle-distance runner
- Maarten Paes (born 1998), Indonesian footballer
- Papaléo Paes (1952–2020), Brazilian politician and physician
- Rui Paes (born 1957), Mozambican painter
- Shirley Paes Leme (born 1955), Brazilian visual artist
- Vece Paes (1945–2025), Indian hockey midfielder
