= Bhakta Dhruva =

- Directed by: Parshwanath Altekar
- Screenplay by: Devudu Narasimha Shastry
- Produced by: U. L. Narayana Rao
- Starring: Master Muthu; T. Dwarakanath; T. Kanakalakshmamma; G. Nagesh
- Music by: Harmonium Sheshadri Rao
- Production company: Jayavani Talkies
- Distributed by: Shaymprasad Movies
- Release date: 1 April 1934
- Running time: 142 minutes
- Country: India
- Language: Kannada

Bhakta Dhruva is a 1934 Indian Kannada language Hindu mythological devotional film directed by Parshwanath Altekar and produced by U. L. Narayana Rao. Although this was the very Kannada language talkie film to begin production, it was released as the second Kannada talkie, almost a month after Sati Sulochana. The film was made at the Ajanta Studio in Mumbai and premiered at the "Select Cinema" hall in Bangalore.

Based on the play by Ratnavali Natak Company, the film was made by the Marathi stage and film director, as a tribute to the Karnataka theater personality, A. V. Varadachar, who died in 1933.

The film cast consisted of Master Muthu, grandson of Varadachar, in the titular lead role along with T. Dwarkanath, G. Nagesh, H. S. Krishnamurthy Iyengar among others. The music was composed by Harmonium Sheshadri Rao.

== Plot ==
The film tells a mythological story about the child Dhruva who in utmost devotion towards Lord Vishnu, ultimately finds a place in sky as the brightest star (Dhruva Nakshatra) and finds solace at the place.

== Cast ==
- Master Muthu as Dhruva
- T. Dwarkanath
- H. S. Krishnamurthy Iyengar
- T. Kanakalakshmamma
- S. K. Padma Devi as Bhoo Devi
- G. Nagesha Rao
- Devudu Narasimha Shastry
- M. G. Mari Rao

== See more ==
- Dhruba

== External sources ==
- Bhakta Dhruva at IMDb
- Bhakta Dhruva on Chiloka.com

songs.pk
