= Chiranjeevi (disambiguation) =

Chiranjeevi (born 1955) is an Indian actor.

Chiranjeevi or Chiranjivi may also refer to:

- Chiranjivis, the immortals in Hinduism, the Sanskrit term is a combination of chiram (permanent or long) and jivi (lived); in Ramayana for example, Hanuman is referred to as a Chiranjivi

== People ==
- Chiranjeevi Sarja (1984 – 2020), Indian film actor in Kannada films
- Gonnabattula Chiranjeevi (born 1992), Indian first-class cricketer

== Other use ==
- Chiranjeevi (1936 film), a 1936 Kannada film directed by K.P. Bhave
- Chiranjeevi (1976 film), a 1976 Kannada film directed by A. Bhimsingh
- Chiranjeevi (1984 film), a 1984 Indian Tamil film directed by K. Shankar
- Chiranjeevi (1985 film), a 1985 Telugu language film directed by C. V. Rajendran

== See also ==
- Chiranjeevulu (disambiguation)
- Amarajeevi (disambiguation)
