= Mary Leslie =

Mary Leslie may refer to:

- Mary Eliza Leslie (1834–1907), writer and Baptist missionary in colonial India
- Mary Isabel Leslie (1899–1978), Irish nationalist and writer
- Lady Mary Hamilton (1736–1821), née Leslie, Scottish novelist
