= Tripuramba =

Indian actress

- Born: 17 July 1910; Mysore state, British India
- Died: 1979 (aged 68–69)
- Occupations: Actress; singer
- Spouse: Venugopal

Tripuramba (1910–1979) was an Indian actress and singer who worked in Kannada films. She is best remembered playing Sulochana in the first Kannada talkie Sati Sulochana, released in 1934, which made her the first heroine of Kannada cinema.

== Career ==
Tripuramba played the role of Sulochana, the wife of Indrajith, in the first talkie film of Kannada cinema Sati Sulochana opposite Subbaiah Naidu. This movie made her the first heroine of Kannada.

Her only other movie was Purandaradasa in 1937. She died in 1979.

== Filmography ==
Apart from numerous stage plays, Tripuramba acted in two films.

Year	Title	Role	Language	Notes
1934	Sati Sulochana	Sulochana	Kannada	First heroine of Kannada cinema
1937	Purandaradasa	Saraswati	Kannada	
