= Mary Eliza Leslie =

Indian writer

- Born: January 13, 1834; Munger
- Died: May 28, 1907 (aged 73)
- Occupation: Poet, writer

Mary Eliza Leslie (January 13, 1834 – May 28, 1907) was a writer and Baptist missionary in colonial India.

== Life and career ==
Mary Eliza Leslie was born on January 13, 1834, in Monghyr, India. She was the daughter of the Rev. Andrew Leslie (1798–1870) and his second wife. A product of the Scottish Enlightenment, Andrew Leslie was a printer who travelled to India as a Baptist missionary. His first wife, Eliza Franklin (1805–1826), died there and Andrew Leslie married the daughter of his predecessor, the Rev. John Chamberlain, and they had a son and a daughter together. Andrew leslie took the pulpit of the Lower Circular Road Baptist Church in Calcutta in 1842.

With the exception of a brief childhood trip to Britain, Leslie spent her entire life in India. Her education must have been quite substantial, as she had knowledge of Greek, Italian, and German, and probably Bangla and Urdu.

Her first collection of poetry, Ina and Other Poems, was published in Calcutta in 1856. Her second volume, published in London in 1858, was Sorrows, Aspirations, and Legends from India. The centerpiece of this sonnet sequence is the Siege of Lucknow, which she refers to as "The Sorrow", and casts as heroes British officers Henry Lawrence and Henry Havelock, the latter a friend of Leslie's father. The work is pro-British, nationalist, and evangelical, disdaining the Bibighar massacre while making no mention of British atrocities.

Her final volume of poems, Heart Echoes from the East; or, Sacred Lyrics and Sonnets, was published by the evangelical publisher James Nisbet in London in 1861 and contains personal, devotional verse. It contains Leslie's most reprinted poem, "The Gathering Home," which begins "They are gathering homeward from every land". It has been frequently used as a hymn and appears in William Rawson Stevenson's School Hymnal (1880).

Leslie also wrote a number of prose works based on her missionary and educational work. They are: Dawn of Light: A Story of the Zenana Mission (London, 1868), Eastern Blossoms: Sketches of Native Christian Life in India (London, 1875), and A Child of the Day: A Brief Memorial of Mrs. H. C. Mukerji (Calcutta, 1882).

Leslie became an invalid and died at Barrackpore on 28 May 1907, aged 73 years. She was buried at the Lower Circular Road Cemetery in Kolkata.
