= Chiranjeevulu =

Chiranjeevulu (lit. 'Immortals') may refer to:

- Chiranjivi, immortal beings in Hinduism
- Chiranjeevulu (1956 film), Indian Telugu-language film by Vedantam Raghavayya
- Chiranjeevulu (2001 film), Indian Telugu-language film by Radha Krishna

== See also ==
- Chiranjeevi (disambiguation)
