= Meghnad Badh Kavya =

Bangla epic poem

The Slaying of Meghanada
- Author: Michael Madhusudan Dutt
- Original title: মেঘনাদবধ কাব্য
- Translator: Clinton B. Seely
- Language: Bengali
- Genre: Epic poem
- Publication date: 1861
- Publication place: British India
- Original text: মেঘনাদবধ কাব্য at Bangla Wikisource

Meghnad Badh Kavya (Bengali: মেঘনাদবধ কাব্য; English: The Slaying of Meghnada) is a Bengali epic poem by Michael Madhusudan Dutta. Regarded as a central work in Bengali literature and Dutta's greatest literary work as well as the finest epic in Bengali literature and also as one of the greatest works of world literature. Meghnad Badh Kavya is based on the demise of Meghnad (a.k.a. Indrajit), son of Ravana, the king of Lanka in the classic Sanskrit epic Ramayana. Michael Madhusudan Dutt was an ardent admirer of both European literature and Indian literature and the epic owes much to Milton, Tasso, Homer, Virgil, Valmiki, Vyasa and Kalidasa.

The poem is divided into 9 cantos. Each part exhibits different incidents. Starting from the death of Beerbahu, son of Ravana, it is continued till the sati-daha (the ancient Indian custom of burning the widows alive with the dead husband) of Prameela, Meghnad's beloved wife.

The poem starts with the lines:

সম্মুখ সমরে পড়ি, বীর-চূড়ামণি
বীরবাহু, চলি যবে গেলা যমপুরে
অকালে...

Translation:

The great hero, being defeated in a face-to-face battle,
Beerbahu, leaves to the dead man's world,
long before he should have ...

== Critical review ==
Meghnad or Indrajit was the son of Ravana, who used Brahmastra to kill 670 Million Vanaras in Ramayana. He was slain by Lakshmana, while he was worshiping Goddess Nikumvilā, in the royal temple of Lanka, because of betrayal by Vibhishana, who was an uncle of Meghnad. Meghnad asked Lakshmana not to fight with an unarmed person, rebuking him as a coward; but Lakshmana did not oblige. This is the central theme of this epic.

'In an updated letter to his friend Rajnarayan Basu he is reported to have said "I despise Rama and his rabble, but the idea of Ravana elevates and kindles my imagination, he was a grand fellow." Some critics point out that this can be attributed to his exposure to western education but Ghulam Murshid feels that it, by itself would not have made him think in such a radical way. He feels that this attitude was the result of a number of reasons, one of the prominent ones being his conversion to Christianity "that helped him to look at traditional beliefs with new eyes." One remembers Milton and his portrayal of Satan in Paradise Lost and the oft-quoted declaration of the later, "It is better to reign in Hell than to serve in heaven." Predictably, Dutt himself, rather than his works attracted more attention than his works.' - Purabi Panwar wrote in her review work on "Lured by Hope : A Biography of Michael Madhusudan Dutt by Ghulam Murshid and Gopa Majumdar".

Here are some comments of a few pioneers of Bengali literature:

1. "...to Homer and Milton, as well as to Valmiki, he is largely indebted, and his poem is on the whole the most valuable work in modern Bengali literature." -Bankim Chandra Chattopadhyay
2. "The Epic Meghnad-Badh is really a rare treasure in Bengali literature. Through his writings, the richness of Bengali literature has been proclaimed to the wide world." -Rabindranath Tagore
3. "MeghnadBadh is a supreme poem." -Ishwar Chandra Vidyasagar

== Quotations from the poet ==
Dutta had mentioned this ballad many times in his letters, of which a few are listed:

1. "Perhaps the episode of Sita's abduction (Fourth Book) should not have been admitted since it is scarcely connected with the progress of the Fable. But would you willingly part with it? Many here look upon that Book as the best among the five ..." (1860)
2. " ... I got a severe attack of fever and was laid up for six or seven days. It was a struggle whether Meghanad will finish me or I finish him. Thank Heaven. I have triumphed. He is dead, that is to say, I have finished the VI Books in about 750 lines. It cost me many a tear to kill him." (1860)
