= Anjalikastra =

Celestial weapon in Hindu mythology

Anjalikastra is a celestial weapon in Hinduism. Anjalikastra was a personal astra (celestial weapon) of the king of the devas, Indra. According to Hindu literature, using this weapon on an opponent decapitates them. In some stories, it is also said that Lakshmana - the brother of Rama - used the same Anjalikastra to kill Indrajita. This astra is mentioned when Mahabharata's Arjuna used it to kill Karna.

== Ramayana ==
In some versions of Ramayana, it is said that Meghanada (Indrajita) was killed by the usage of Anjalikastra. Meghanada had been granted a boon from Brahma that after the completion of the Yagna (fire-worship) of his native goddess Prathyangira -"Nikumbhila yagna", he will get a celestial chariot, mounting on which, he will win over any enemy in war and become invulnerable. But Brahma also cautioned him that whosoever would destroy this yagna would also kill him. Indrajita through severe penance convinced Brahma to give him a boon in which it was promised to him that Indrajita would only be killed by such a man who hadn't had sleep for fourteen years continuously. Thus Lakshmana was only the person at that time whose life satisfied those conditions and thus he was the only person eligible to kill Indrajita. Knowing this, Vibhishana requested Lakshmana to destroy Indrajit's yagna. Lakshmana was eventually successful in spoiling Indrajit's Nikumbhila Yagna and finally killed Meghanada using Anjalikastra.

== Mahabharata ==
On the 17th day of the Kurukshetra war, Karna and Arjuna faced each other and started fighting. Near the conclusion of the battle, Karna had gotten down from his chariot to get its sunken wheel out of the ground. Having descended from his chariot, Karna requested Arjuna to cease shooting arrows for a moment so that he could get his stuck wheel outside the ground, thus keeping in mind the rules of Dharmayuddha (righteous warfare). However, Krishna on the contrary, reminded Arjuna about the gruesome killing of Abhimanyu at the hands of the principal Kaurava warriors, including Karna, urging Arjuna to shoot arrows at his adversary. Hearing this, Karna launched a multitude of arrows and celestial missiles at Arjuna, all of which were countered. At last, Arjuna brought out the Anjalikastra, praying to Indra that this arrow brings the defeat and death of his adversary, and shot it. It was this very celestial missile, which was used by the son of Kunti to behead his own elder brother, albeit Arjuna didn't know at the time about his relation with Karna. This episode has been narrated in vivid detail in the Karna Parva of the Mahabharata.
