= Sati Sulochana =

1934 film by Yaragudipati Varada Rao

- Directed by: Yaragudipati Varada Rao
- Screenplay by: Bellave Narahari Shastri
- Based on: Ramayana by Valmiki
- Produced by: Chamanlal Doongaji; Shah Bhurmal Chamanlalji
- Starring: Subbaiah Naidu; Tripuramba; R. Nagendra Rao; D. N. Murthy Rao; Y. V. Rao; C. T. Sheshachalam
- Music by: R. Nagendra Rao; H. R. Padmanabha Sastry
- Production company: Prabhat Studio
- Release date: 3 March 1934
- Running time: 173 minutes
- Country: India
- Language: Kannada

Sati Sulochana is a 1934 Indian Kannada-language film directed by Y. V. Rao. The film was released on 3 March 1934 and is the first talkie film in Kannada language. It is also the first film to be screened in the erstwhile Mysore Kingdom.

It is a lost film. Though initially it was believed that the movie had 18 songs, a gramophone record jacket found in private archives showed that the movie had as many as 30 songs belying the notion that the first four Kannada talkie movies had no recorded sound tracks.

== Plot ==
Sati Sulochana is based on the character Sulochana from the Ramayana. She is the wife of Indrajit and the daughter-in-law of Ravana, the demon-king in Ramayana. The film tries to portray the goings-on of the war between the Hindu god Rama and Ravana as seen from the point of view of Sulochana. Ravana abducts Rama's wife Sita to his kingdom of Lanka, drawing Rama into a war. In the course of the war, Rama's brother Lakshmana is knocked unconscious by an arrow from Indrajit and is revived by a medicinal herb called Sanjeevani. The revived Lakshmana kills Indrajit, making Sulochana a widow. Ravana's defeat by Rama and the killing of Indrajit is viewed through the eyes of Sulochana. Unable to bear the pain of her husband's death, Sulochana kills herself in sati self-immolition.

== Cast ==
- Subbaiah Naidu as Indrajit
- Tripuramba as Sulochana
- R. Nagendra Rao as Ravana
- Lakshmi Bai as Mandodari
- Y. V. Rao as Lakshmana
- C. V. Seshachalam as Narada
- D. N. Murthy Rao as Rama
- S. K. Padmadevi as Sakhi
- Indubala

== Background ==
The producer of the film was a Marwari businessman from Bangalore (a native of Ahore, Jalore District of Rajasthan) named Shah Chamanlal Doongaji, who started a film production company in Bangalore called South India Movietone in 1932. He decided to make a mythological movie called Sati Sulochana involving characters from the Ramayana like Ravana, Ravana's son Indrajit, Ravana's wife Mandodari and Indrajit's wife Sulochana. He engaged Yaragudipati Varada Rao to direct the film as well as play a character of Lakshmana, Bellave Narahari Shastri to write the screenplay, dialogues and lyrics. Nagendra Rao, who had previous exposure to films, was selected to play the role of Ravana and was given an additional role of production management. M. V. Subbaiah Naidu was selected to play the lead role of Indrajit and two ladies; Lakshmi Bai and Tripuramba were selected to play the roles of Mandodari and Sulochana respectively.

== Production ==
Sachin Nayaka chose to shoot the film at Chatrapathi Studio in Kolhapur. The production was started in December 1933 and took 2 months to complete. Shooting was entirely done in natural sunlight and by man-made reflectors. The camera assistants carried mirrors on their shoulders to project light onto the set to provide back lighting. They had to keep moving mirrors in alignement with the moving sun. The sets were not having ceiling but they were covered with white cloth. Also, there was no glycerine at that time. Some water drops were sprayed near to the eyes of actress to pass them off as tears. The total amount spent for production was ₹40,000. The film involved shooting a war scene and this was done using 2 cameras. The film was released on 3 March 1934 at Paramount cinema theatre (later called as Parimala talkies) near the City Market of Bangalore. The length of the film was 173 minutes. Being the first Kannada talkie film, it ran house-full at Bangalore for six weeks.

== Soundtrack ==
All lyrics are written by Bellave Narahari Shastri.

Track list
No.	Title	Music	Singer(s)	Length
1.	"Deva Gurugalemage"	R. Nagendra Rao	R. Nagendra Rao
2.	"Bhale Bhale Parvathi"	H R Padmanabha Shastry	Lakshmi Bai

== See also ==
- List of Kannada films
- Kannada cinema
