= Vece Paes =

Indian field hockey player (1945–2025)

Personal information
- Born: 30 April 1945 Goa, Portuguese India
- Died: 14 August 2025 (aged 80) Kolkata, West Bengal, India
- Education: Nil Ratan Sircar Medical College; Master of Surgery; MBBS
- Spouse: Jennifer Paes
- Children: Leander Paes

Sport
- Sport: Field hockey
- Position: Midfielder
Medal record
Men's field hockey
Representing India
Olympic Games
Bronze medal – third place	1972 Munich
World Cup
Bronze medal – third place	1971 Barcelona

Vece Paes (30 April 1945 – 14 August 2025) was an Indian field hockey player, sports physician, surgeon, and sports administrator. Paes played the role of a midfielder on the Indian hockey team that won the bronze medal at the 1972 Munich Olympics. He was a sports medicine expert and held positions in various sports bodies, including the BCCI and ACC.

== Early life and education ==
Paes was a Goan Christian, born on 30 April 1945 in Goa, formerly Portuguese India. His father and three siblings were doctors. He did his schooling at St. Joseph’s Boys' School, Bangalore from 1951 to 1962 and later, moved back to Kolkata for his pre-university at St. Xavier's College from 1963 to 1964 and Presidency University from 1964 to 1965.

He completed his MBBS at Nil Ratan Sircar Medical College and Hospital in 1974. He also practiced general surgery from 1974 to 1983 and later, specialised in corporate and sports medicine (1984–2000).

== Playing career ==
It was his teacher at St. Xavier's College in Kolkata, Cecil K. Leeming, a Catholic priest and lecturer, who encouraged him to take up hockey. Paes father, Peter, opposed it initially, as it would affect his future career in medicine. He joined East Bengal hockey team in 1966 and played for 13 years. He won 9 Beighton Cups and 9 Calcutta League titles and Olympian Gurbux Singh was also part of the team with him. Later, Singh was his captain at the Olympics. He made his senior India debut at Hamburg in 1966 under the captaincy of Gurbux Singh and played for India till 1972. He competed in the 1971 Barcelona World Cup and the 1972 Munich Olympics, winning bronze medals in both. He also played divisional-level cricket, football, rugby, and soccer.

== Sports administration ==
=== Sports medicine and consulting ===
He was a sports medical consultant to the All India Tennis Association since 1991 and the All India Football Federation from 1996 to 2001. He worked with the Indian Olympic Association during events such as the 1994 Hiroshima Asian Games and the 2000 Sydney Olympics. He was also the team doctor for India’s Davis Cup team.

=== Cricket anti-doping and fitness ===
Asian Cricket Council (ACC), Sports Medicine and Fitness Consultant (2001–2009): developed sports medicine programmes across 18 Asian countries, including peak performance, age verification, and anti-doping initiatives; served as tutor for ACC–Cricket Australia courses.

He was the Anti-Doping Consultant of Board of Control for Cricket in India (BCCI) from 2010 to 2025 and oversaw national anti-doping programmes, compliance, testing, athlete education, and the National Player Pool whereabouts system.

=== Leadership roles in sport ===
He was the president of the Indian Rugby Football Union (1996–2002) and the Calcutta Cricket & Football Club, one of the oldest sports clubs of India and was also a medical contributor to East Bengal football.

== Personal life and death ==
Paes married Jennifer Paes, a former captain of India’s basketball team and great-granddaughter of Bengali poet Michael Madhusudan Dutt. The couple had three children: Leander Paes, who became one of India’s greatest tennis players and an Olympic medalist, along with two daughters settled abroad.

Paes died after a prolonged illness in Kolkata, on the morning of 14 August 2025, at the age of 80. He had been suffering from Parkinson's disease and was admitted to Woodlands Hospital for treatment. His funeral rites were held later in the week after his daughters returned from overseas.
