= Satya Harishchandra (1943 film) =

1943 Kannada film directed by R. Nagendra Rao

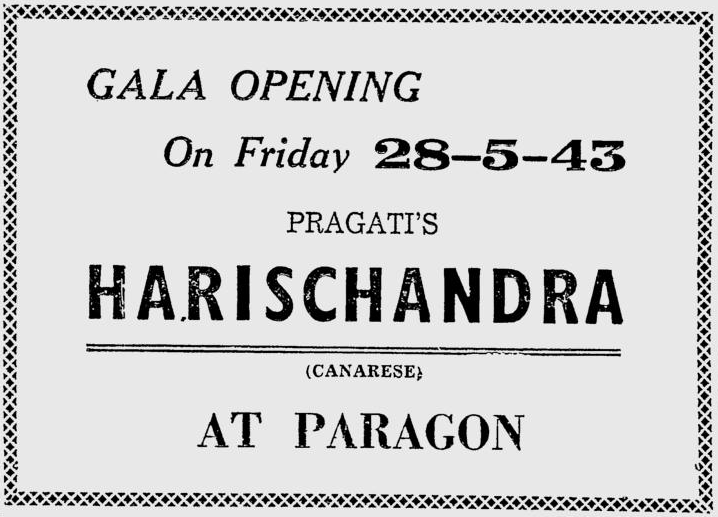
- Advertisement for the film
- Directed by: R. Nagendra Rao
- Screenplay by: R. Nagendra Rao
- Produced by: A. V. Meiyappan; R. Nagendra Rao
- Starring: Subbaiah Naidu; Lakshmibai; R. Nagendra Rao
- Cinematography: P. V. Krishna Iyer
- Edited by: M. V. Raman
- Music by: R. Sudarshanam
- Production company: Pragathi Studios
- Distributed by: Famous Talkie Distributors
- Release date: 28 May 1943
- Running time: 119 minutes
- Country: India
- Language: Kannada

Satya Harishchandra is a 1943 Indian Kannada-language film directed by R. Nagendra Rao. It stars Subbaiah Naidu, Lakshmibai and Rao. The music of the film was composed by R. Sudarshanam. The film was successful at the box office and ran for 100 days in Dharwad. The movie was dubbed in Tamil making it the first Kannada movie to be dubbed in other language.

== Cast ==
- Subbaiah Naidu as Harischandra
- R. Nagendra Rao
- Lakshmibai as Chandramathi
- G. V. Krishnamurthy Rao
- M. G. Marirao
- B. S. Raja Iyengar as Narada
- Kamalabai
- Narasimhan (credited as Master Narasimhan)

== Soundtrack ==
The music of the film was composed by R. Sudarsanam with lyrics for the soundtracks penned by Gamiki Ramakrishna Sastry.

Tracklist
No.	Title	Lyrics	Singer(s)	Length
1.	"Kaamadhenu Namipena"	Gamiki Ramakrishna Sastry	Kamala Bai
2.	"Paahi Shubhacharithe"	Gamiki Ramakrishna Sastry	Raja Iyengar
3.	"Sadaa Sukhee"	Gamiki Ramakrishna Sastry	Lakshmi Bai
4.	"Shanthiye Jeevana"	Gamiki Ramakrishna Sastry	Raja Iyengar

== Production and release ==
Film producer A. V. Meiyappan went to his hometown of Karaikudi after the success of his 1941 Tamil film Sabapathy due to apprehensions surrounding bombing of Madras by the Japanese with the World War II on. He returned to Madras and began the production of Satya Harishchandra as a joint venture with the theatre troupe SSS Natakamandali. R. Nagendra Rao was roped in to direct and A. T. Krishnaswamy as the assistant director. The cast included Subbaiah Naidu playing the role of the Harischandra, Lakshmibai as Chandramathi; Rao, J. V. Krishnamurthy Rao, M. G. Marirao, Kamalabai and Narasimhan. Musician B. S. Raja Iyengar made his acting debut playing Narada. The edited length of the film was restricted to 11,000 feet (3,400 m) due to wartime regulation of raw stock. It was released on 28 May 1943. The film was a commercial success.

The film was dubbed into Tamil and released as Harishchandra on 6 January 1944. It was the first Indian film to be dubbed into another language. A. T. Krishnaswamy wrote the dialogues for the Tamil film while R. Nagendra Rao helped him with the words that would match the artistes' lip movement. V. S. Raghavan was the pioneering sound engineer who dubbed the film.
