= Amarajeevi (disambiguation) =

Potti Sreeramulu (1901–1952), also known as Amarajeevi, was an Indian revolutionary and activist.

Amarajeevi may also refer to:

- Amarajeevi (1965 film), a Kannada film
- Amarajeevi (1983 film), a Telugu film

== See also ==
- Amara (disambiguation)
- Chiranjeevi (disambiguation)
