= Chiranjeevi (1936 film) =

- Directed by: K. P. Bhave
- Written by: Devudu Narasimha Sastri
- Screenplay by: Devudu Narasimha Sastri
- Produced by: V A Mudholkar
- Starring: Devudu Narasimha Sastri; Sharada; Malavalli Sundaramma; Basavaraja Mansoor
- Cinematography: Purohith
- Edited by: Studio Technicians
- Music by: Harmonium H K Sheshagirirao
- Production company: Canarese Talkies
- Distributed by: Canarese Talkies
- Release date: 1936
- Country: India
- Language: Kannada

Chiranjeevi ( transl. Immortal) is a 1936 Indian Kannada film, directed by K. P. Bhave and produced by V. A. Mudholkar. The film stars Devudu Narasimha Sastri, Sharada, Malavalli Sundaramma and Basavaraja Mansoor. The film had musical score by Harmonium H K Sheshagirirao.

== Cast ==
- Devudu Narasimha Sastri
- Sharada
- Malavalli Sundaramma
- Basavaraja Mansoor
- R S Murthy
- Narayanrao
- Krishnarao Nadgir
- Amirbai Karnataki
- Master Narayan
- Leela
- Gangu
- Mudaveedu Krishnaraya
- Jeevannarao Desai
- K H Parvathibai
