= Mahatma Kabir (film) =

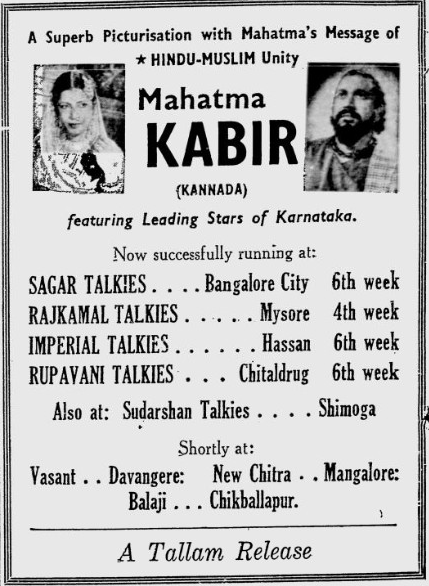
- Advertisement for the film that appeared on The Indian Express, 1947
- Directed by: R. Nagendra Rao
- Starring: R. Nagendra Rao; Subbaiah Naidu
- Music by: S. Subbaraman
- Production company: Pragati
- Distributed by: Tallam Pictures Circuit
- Release date: 24 October 1947
- Country: India
- Language: Kannada

Mahatma Kabir is a 1947 Indian Kannada-language film directed by R. Nagendra Rao. He also stars in the lead role alongside Subbaiah Naidu. The film deals with Mahatma Gandhi's vision of harmony between the Hindus and Muslims. It was set in the backdrop of the religious violence in India that took place after the Independence from the British rule.

== Cast ==
- R. Nagendra Rao
- Subbaiah Naidu
- Lakshmi Bai
- Kamalabai
- M. G. Mari Rao
- H. R. Shastry

== Reception ==
The Indian Express called the film a "fine picture". The reviewer wrote, "The picture has [Rao's] best directorial touches in all the important sequences and the quality of photography, recording and costumes have aptly contributed for the good standard of the production." He further added, "Mr. Nagendra Rao deserves congratulations for his achievement in ably directing this in the most suitable way to tackle the present-day problems."
