= Gour Das Bysack =

19th century Bengali writer

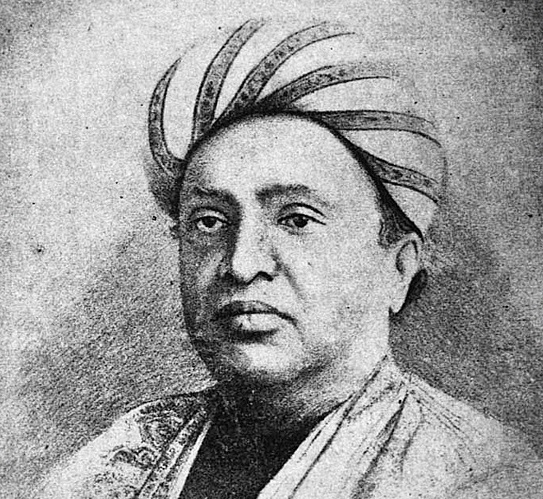
- Born: 1826; Burrabazar, Calcutta, Bengal Presidency, British India
- Died: 1899 (Age 72-73); Calcutta, Bengal Presidency, British India
- Education: Hindu College
- Occupation: Writer

Gour Das Bysack (sometimes parts of his name have been transliterated as Gaur, Dass, Dos, Bysac) was a Bengali writer prominent in the late 19th century. He was known for his friendship with Michael Madhusudan Dutta. He died before 1901.

== Biography ==
Born in the Basak Family of Burabazar, he was a classmate of Michael Madhusudan Dutt while studying in Hindu College. He was also a companion of social reformer Ishwar Chandra Vidyasagar. Although he did not influence the original writings, he was closely involved in the cultural field of the time. He played a significant role in the play 'Ratnabali'. During his career as a Deputy Magistrate, he wrote informative essays on traditional archeology wherever he went. While in Howrah, he wrote an article entitled Notes on a Buddhist Monastery at Bhot Bagan in Howrah.

He was a Fellow of Calcutta University, a member of the Philological Society of England and the Indian Association. He was a member and general secretary of the Bengal Royal Asiatic Society. He Also established a school in Baranagar.

== Works published ==
- Journal of the Asiatic Society of Bengal. Vol. LIX. 189.pp. 50–9. Notes on a Buddhist Monastery at Bhot Bagan in Howrah
