= Sulochana (wife of Indrajit) =

Wife of Meghanada in Ramayana versions

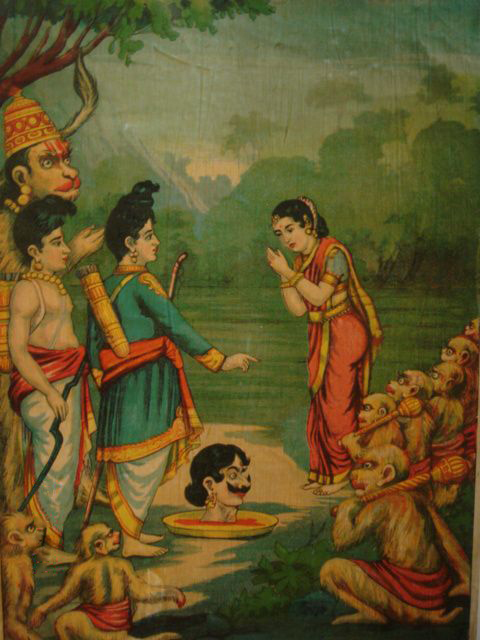
- Sulochana receives the head of her husband Meghanada, who has been killed by Lakshmana
- Other names: Prameela
- Devanagari: सुलोचना
- Sanskrit transliteration: Sulochana
- Affiliation: Nāga
- Abode: Vaikuntha
- Texts: Versions of the Ramayana; Meghnad Badh Kavya

Genealogy
- Parents: Shesha (father)
- Consort: Meghanada

Sulochana (Sanskrit: सुलोचना, romanized: Sulocanā, lit. 'she of beautiful eyes') is a character featured in Hindu literature. She is the daughter of the king of the serpents, Shesha, and married to Meghanada (Indrajita), the eldest son of Ravana. Sulochana finds no mention in the Valmiki Ramayana, and appears in later versions of the epic.

== Literature ==
In versions of the Ramayana, following the death of her husband, Sulochana received the head of her husband. She realised that Lakshmana was none other than her father Shesha's incarnation. She was devotee of Rama.

In the ballad Meghnad Badh Kavya, Prameela is said to be Indrajit's wife. Prameela is regarded to be another name of Sulochana.

== In popular culture ==
Her story has been the basis of many films, including Sati Sulochana (1921) directed by G.V. Sane. a silent film, followed by Sati Sulochana, 1934 Kannada film was the first Kannada language talkie film, also Sati Sulochana (1961 film) in Telugu starring N. T. Rama Rao. also in Hindi film 'Sati Naag Kanya' by Babubhai Mistri starring Vikram Gokhale and Jaishree Gadkar.

The Ballad Of Sulochana is a favourite ballad of Marathi women, sung in most families. Noted Tamil scholar S. K. Ramarajan wrote a noted epyllion, Meganadham, the tragedy of Indrajit, known for its characterisation of Indrajit's wife Sulochana.

There is a prominent character named Sulochana Amavasya in the video game Cultist Simulator. Like the mythical Sulochana, this character is noted for her bright, alluring eyes and for her phlegmatic countenance.
