= Jennifer Paes =

Indian basketball player (1949–2026)

Personal information
- Born: 19 January 1951
- Died: 17 May 2026 (aged 75) Kolkata, West Bengal, India
- Spouse: Vece Paes
- Children: 3 (including Leander Paes)

Sport
- Sport: Basketball

Jennifer Paes (née Dutton; 19 January 1951 – 17 May 2026) was an Indian basketball player who captained the Indian national basketball team in 1982. She accompanied her husband, field hockey player Vece Paes, to the Olympics.

== Early life ==
Jennifer was the daughter of Michael Dutton and Ruby Myrtle Nyss of Calcutta and great-granddaughter of Bengali poet Michael Madhusudan Dutt. Her uncle Garney Nyss was an accomplished sportsman in multiple sports including field hockey, speed skating, athletics, cricket, badminton and tennis.

== Personal life and death ==
Paes was married to India's former field hockey player Vece Paes. Their son is Leander Paes, India's top tennis player and Olympic medalist. Jennifer Paes died from cancer on 17 May 2026.
