= Subbaiah Naidu =

Indian actor (1896–1962)

M. V. Subbaiah Naidu
- Born: Mysore Venkatappa Subbaiah Naidu; 1896; Madapura, Heggadadevanakote, Kingdom of Mysore
- Died: 21 July 1962 (aged 65–66); Mandya, Mysore State, India
- Occupations: Actor, film director
- Spouse: Munivenkatamma
- Children: 4, including Lokesh

Mysore Venkatappa Subbaiah Naidu (1896 – 21 July 1962) was an Indian theatre and film actor. He was well known for his work in films like Sati Sulochana (1934)—the first Kannada talkie film, Bhookailas (1940) in Telugu, and Bhakta Prahlada (1958) in Kannada. He was the father of Kannada actor Lokesh and the grandfather of Kannada TV personality Srujan Lokesh. Recognizing his work in theatre, he was awarded the Sangeet Natak Akademi Award in 1961.

== Career ==
Naidu began his acting career appearing in bit roles in stage plays. He soon flourished as an actor and began to play lead roles and had gained a "sizable fan following" in the Kannada theatre circles. The Indian Express, on his obituary wrote, "Brawny roles played with vigour and a mellifluous voice through which flowed the typical elan of stage music were his forte." His film career was marked with frequent collaborations with R. Nagendra Rao, another famed stage and film personality. They made early Kannada films such as Vasantsena (1941), Satya Harishchandra (1943) and Mahatma Kabir (1947) among others. Naidu's final screen appearance came in the 1958 film Bhakta Prahlada on the sets of which he burnt his fingers, and following which he quit films while continuing to perform on stage.

== Death ==
Naidu died on 21 July 1962 of a cardiac arrest in Mandya. In the weeks leading to his death, he was actively involved in theatre with his troupe, Sahitya Samrajya Nataka Mandali. He was in Mandya with the troupe and was playing the role of Ambarisha in a play. His body was brought to Bangalore the same day and a public viewing was held at Subedar Chatram Road. Funeral services were held on 22 July. Hearing the news of his death, his wife Munivenkatamma died the same day.

== Partial filmography ==
Year	Film	Role
1934	Sati Sulochana	Indrajit
1940	Bhookailas	Ravana
1941	Vasantasena	Charudatta
1943	Satya Harishchandra	Harischandra
1947	Mahatma Kabir	
1958	Bhakta Prahlada	
