= Lower Circular Road cemetery =

Cemetery in Calcutta, West Bengal, India

Lower Circular Road Cemetery
- Interactive map of Lower Circular Road Cemetery

Details
- Established: 1840
- Location: Junction of Mother Teresa Sarani & Acharya Jagadish Chandra Bose Road, Kolkata
- Country: India
- Coordinates: 22.547837°N 88.363659°E
- Type: Public
- Owned by: Christian Burial Board, Kolkata
- Size: 33 acres (13 ha)
- No. of graves: c. 12,000
- Find a Grave: Lower Circular Road Cemetery

Lower Circular Road Cemetery, also known as General Episcopal Cemetery, is located on the crossing of Mother Teresa Sarani (former Park Street) and Acharya Jagadish Chandra Bose Road (former Lower Circular Road), Kolkata, India, with its entrance on Acharya Jagadish Chandra Bose Road.

== History ==
Lower Circular Road Cemetery was established in 1840 and is still operating as a functional cemetery. It contains approximately 12,000 graves including many former British East India Company employees. There are two Second World War Commonwealth war graves, of an officer of the British Indian Army and a purser of the BOAC.

== Notable graves ==
- Charles Freer Andrews (died 1940)
- Leslie Claudius (died 2012)
- Henri Hover Locke
- Michael Madhusudan Dutt (died 1873)
- Jules Henri Jean Schaumburg
- Henry Whitelock Torrens (died 1852)
- John Elliot Drinkwater Bethune (died 1851)
- Neil O'Brien (died 2016)
- William Hay Macnaghten
- Heinrich Blochmann (1838-1878), philologist
