= Indrajit =

Son of Ravana in the epic Ramayana

Meghanada
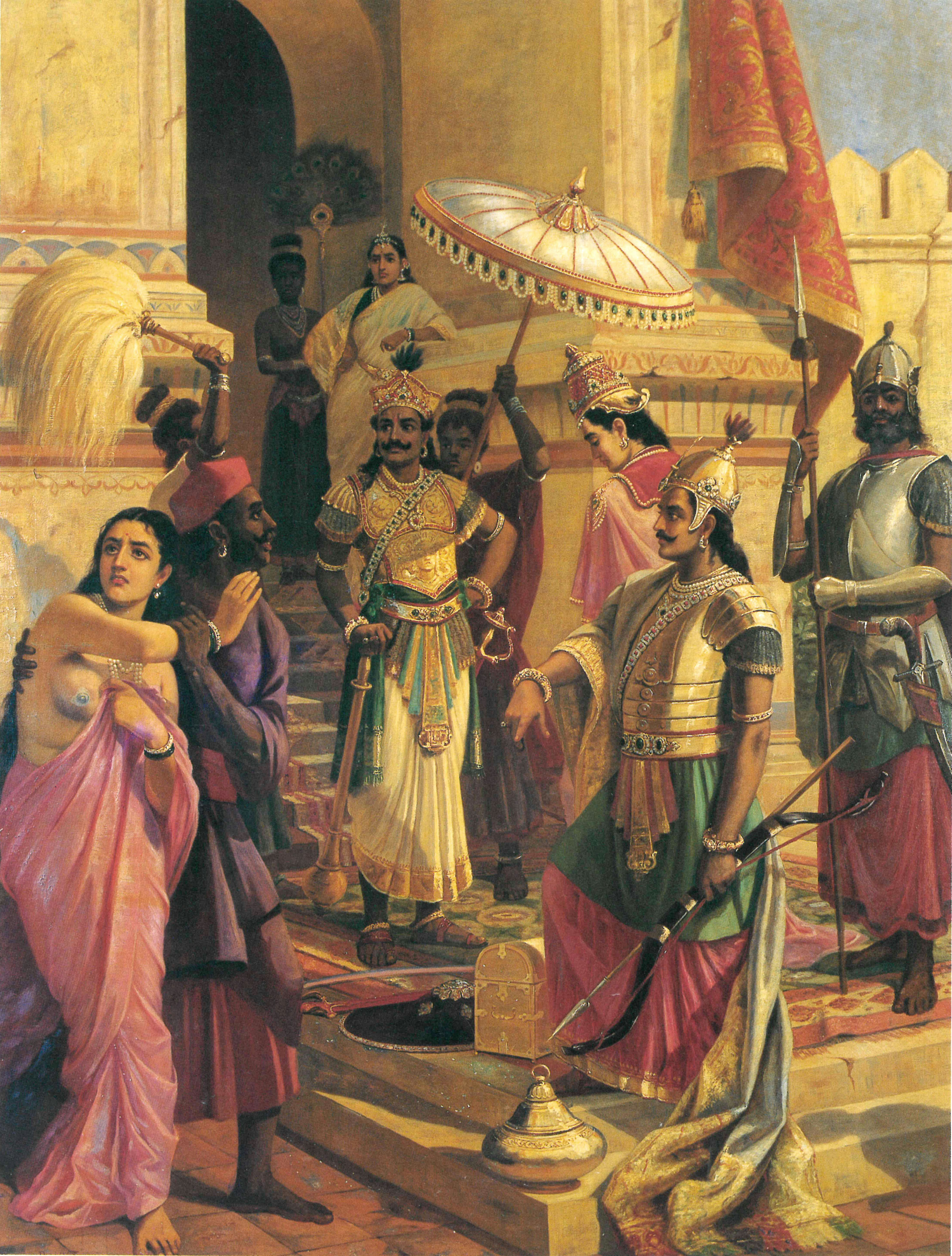
- A painting of Meghanada after his victory over Indra by Raja Ravi Varma

Information
- Aliases: Ravani; Shakrajita; Varidanada; Ghananada; Vasavajita
- Title(s): Indrajita "The Conqueror of Indra"
- Family: Ravana (father); Mandodari (mother); Atikaya; Akshaya Kumara(brothers)
- Spouse: Sulochana (in some recensions of the Ramayana)
- Home: Lanka

Meghanada (Sanskrit: मेघनाद, lit. 'roar of the clouds', IAST: Meghanāda), also referred to by his epithet Indrajit (Sanskrit: इन्द्रजित्, lit. 'conqueror of Indra'), according to Hindu texts, was the eldest son of Ravana and the crown prince of Lanka, who conquered Indraloka (Heaven). He is regarded as one of the greatest warriors in Hindu texts. He is a major character mentioned in the Indian epic Ramayana. Meghanada is the central character in Bengali epic poem Meghnad Badh Kavya. He played an active role in the great war between Rama and Ravana. He acquired many kinds of celestial weapons from his Guru Shukra. His most prominent feat is having defeated the devas in heaven. Using the Brahmastra, Indrajit killed 670 million vanaras in a single day; nearly exterminating the entirety of the vanara race. No warrior had ever achieved this statistical feat before in the Ramayana. He is the only warrior in the entire Ramayana to defeat both Rama and Lakshmana twice while they were both armed by making them unconscious in a battle with the help of astras and sorcery (once by using "Nagapashastra" and another time by using Brahmastra) and finally got killed by Lakshmana. He was said to be a more powerful and superior warrior than his father Ravana by Brahma and Agastya.

== Etymology ==
Indrajita had the special ability to fight from the sky, hidden behind the clouds. That is why both Rama and Lakshmana were defeated during the battle and were tied up by the snake. In Sanskrit, the literal translation of the name "Indrajita" (इन्द्रजित) is mentioned as the "Conqueror of Indra". He defeated Indra, the king of the devas, after which he came to be known as "Indrajita" (the conqueror of Indra). He is also known as Shakrajit, Ravani, Vasavajit, Varidanada, and Ghananada.

== Early life ==
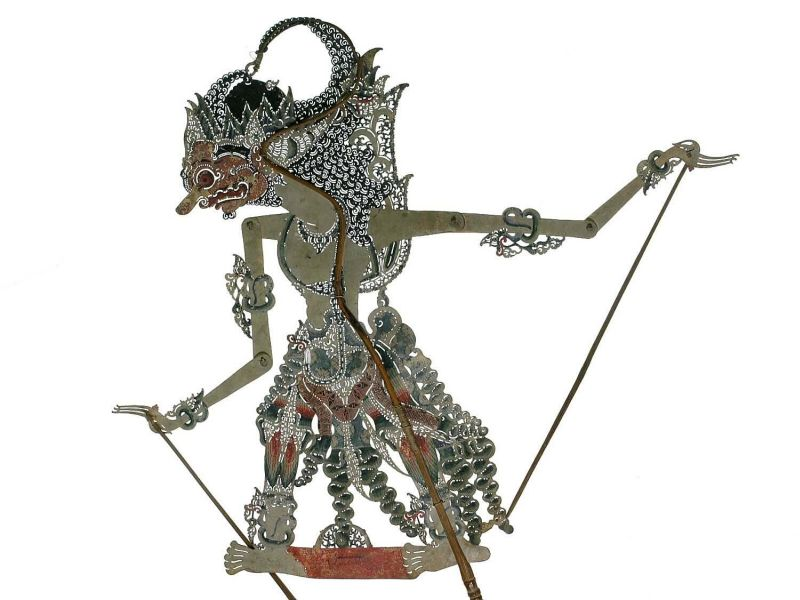
Wayang Figure Of Indrajita.

Indrajita was the eldest son of Ravana and his wife Mandodari. He was named Meghanada because his birth cry sounded like thunder. At the time of his birth, Ravana had ordered all the planets to align in the most auspicious positions. However, Shani (Saturn) disobeyed Ravana's orders and had settled in the 12th house of Meghanada's horoscope. Ravana became furious at this and blamed Shani. Due to the state of Shani, Meghanada had a destined death at the hands of Lakshmana in the war between Prince Rama and Ravana.

Meghanada was also an expert in magical warfare, sorcery and tantra. His wife is not mentioned in the original epic; however in later versions of the epic, Sulochana—the daughter of the King of the serpents Shesha Naga—is mentioned as his wife.

== Brahma's boon ==
During the battle between the devas and Ravana, Indra, king of heavens accompanied by all other devas captured Ravana. To rescue his father, Meghanada grabbed Indra and held him by the waist. He dragged Indra to his celestial chariot and held him tightly around the waist. He brought Indra as a prisoner to the palace in Lanka. Meghanada kept Indra locked in his residence for years and tortured him physically and mentally. Ravana and Meghanada decided to kill Indra. At this juncture, Brahma intervened and asked Meghanada to free Indra. Meghanada obliged and was granted a chance to ask for a boon from Brahma. Meghanada asked for immortality, but Brahma remarked that absolute immortality is against the law of the nature. Instead, he was then granted another boon that after the completion of the Yagna (fire-worship) of his native goddess Prathyangira or the "Nikumbhila yagna" would be completed, he will get a celestial chariot, mounting on which, any enemy can't kill him in a war and become invulnerable. But Brahma also cautioned him that whosoever would destroy this yagna, would also kill him. Brahma was highly impressed by Meghanada's valor in this war and it was Brahma who coined him the name Indrajita ("the conqueror of Indra"). It is also believed that Meghanada was granted another boon by Brahma in which it was promised to him that he would only be killed by a common man who hadn't slept for 14 years continuously.

== Role in battle ==
Meghanada was a warrior on Ravana's side. He was a skilled archer and in illusion warfare techniques.

=== First Day ===
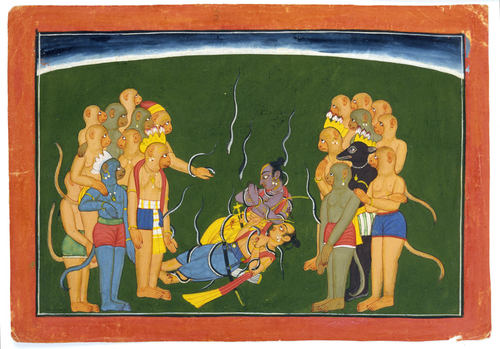
Rama & Lakshmana Bound By Indrajita's Nagapasha

On the first day of his battle with Rama's army, Indrajita was fast with his weapons. Angada jumped onto Indrajit's chariot and destroyed it while killing his horses and charioteer. Immediately, Indrajit became invisible and went into the clouds, from where he attacked and swiftly wiped out the armies of Sugriva, calling on Rama and Lakshmana to come in a direct combat by his illusion tactics of sorcery, so he could avenge the deaths of his paternal uncle and his brothers. When Lakshmana appeared before him, he fought fiercely. Rama grievously wounded him using shabd-bhed arrows and Lakshmana was about to kill him using Bramhastra but Rama resisted him from doing so citing that it's against the rules of warfare to attack an invisible opponent. Rama declared that he would end Meghnada once and for all and Meghnada, predicting Rama's intentions, ran away from the battlefield. Meghnada used his most nefarious weapon Nagapasha (a trap made of a million snakes). They were rescued by Garuda on behest of Hanuman. Garuda was the paternal uncle of Jatayu and Sampati and the enemy of the serpents and also the flying vehicle of Vishnu, of whom Rama was the seventh avatar.

=== Second Day ===
When Indrajita discovered that both Rama and Lakshmana had been rescued by Garuda and were still alive, he was livid and vowed to kill at least one of the brothers on that day. When the battle started, he used all his force to cast a havoc on the armies of Sugriva. At this Lakshmana appeared before him and fought him fiercely. Indrajita used his supreme magical powers, darting across the clouds and skies like a bolt of lightning. He combined his skills of sorcery and illusion warfare, repeatedly vanishing and reappearing behind Lakshmana's back. He was invisible but his arrows hit Lakshmana. Still he wasn't able to match Lord Lakshmana and found him unbeatable. Indrajita used the Pranghatini Sakthi against Lakshmana from his behind, and upon being impaled Lakshmana fell unconscious, poised to die precisely at the following sunrise. His life was saved by Hanuman, who brought the whole mountain of Dronagiri from the Himalayas to Lanka overnight to find the remedy (the magical herb - Sanjivani) for the weapon used by Indrajita and cured him. Although there is false speculation that Rama fought too, Dharma does not allow multiple warriors to fight against one and it was only Lakshmana who was injured because it is against moral duty to fight against an invisible warrior.

=== Third day ===
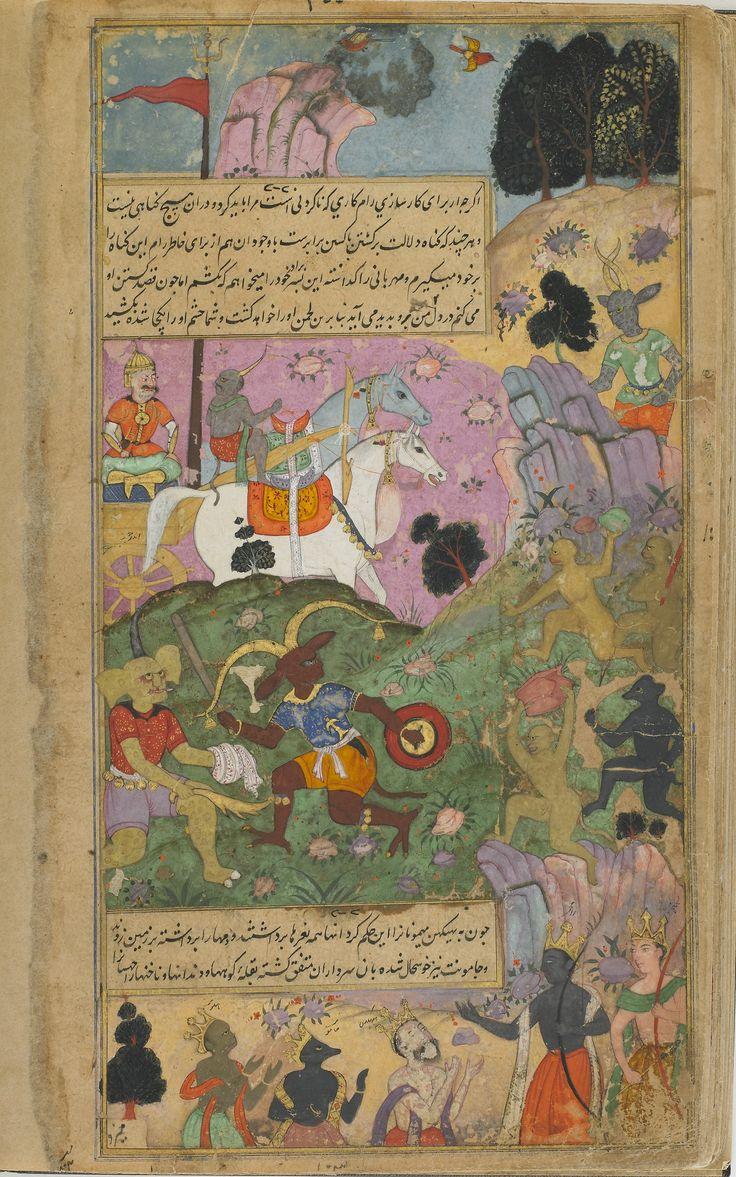
Vibhishana exhorts the monkeys to complete their victory over the rakshasas by slaying Indrajita and his forces

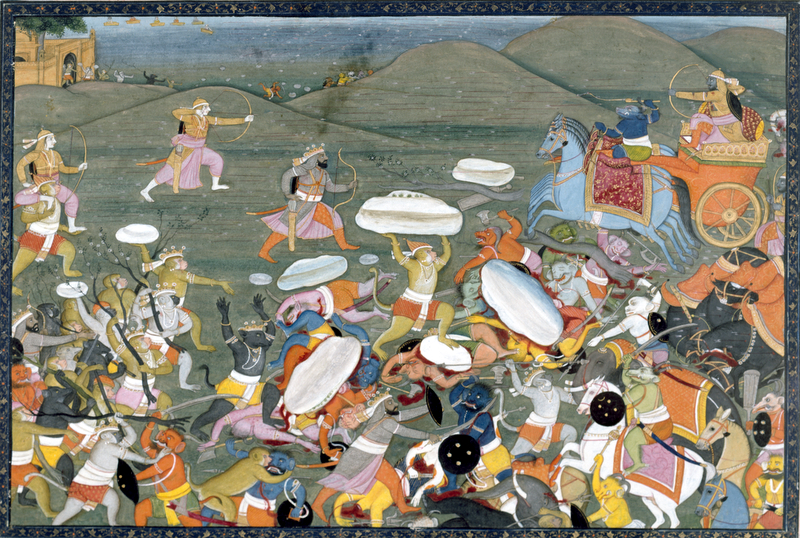
Lakshmana Fights Indrajita

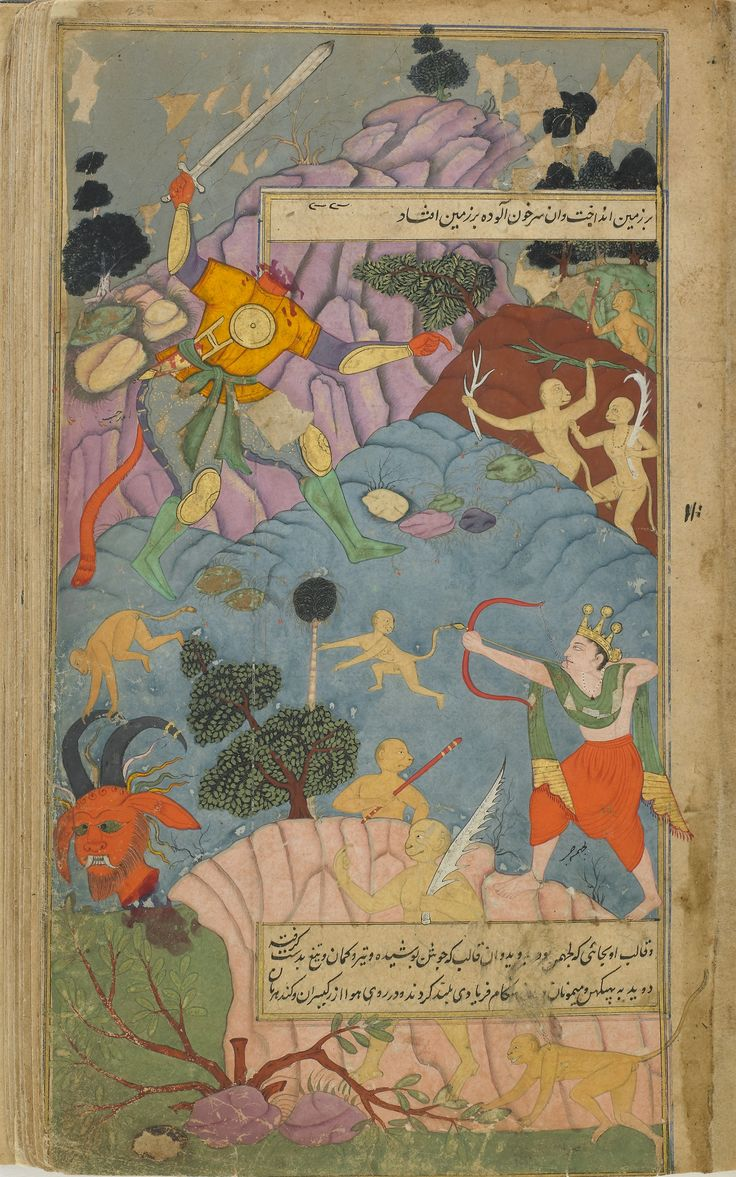
Lakshmana severs Indrajita's head with an arrow given to him by Indra

When Indrajita learned that Lakshmana had survived again, he went to his native deity's secret temple to perform the yagna that would make him a warrior who can't be killed by anyone. Vibhishana, Indrajita's paternal uncle who left Ravana to join Rama, learned of his nephew Indrajita's plans through his spies and alerted Rama. Lakshmana and Vibhisana took the opportunity to face Indrajita in the Yagnaagar. As the Valmiki Ramayana quotes, upon his Yagna being destroyed by the armies of Lakshmana and his treacherous plan failed, Indrajita became enraged and stormed out of the Temple Cave. Seeing his uncle Vibhishana at Lakshmana's side multiplied Indrajita's fury manyfold. He vowed to kill his uncle Vibhisana along with Lakshmana once and for all, letting loose the Yama-astra which he had been conserving for punishing Vibhishana's perceived treason. At this juncture, Lakshmana protected Vibhishana, countering the Yama-astra owing to an earlier warning by Kubera. He fought with Lord Lakshmana but was badly overpowered and wounded by him. Sensing his death, he released the ultimate weapons of the divine Trinity (the Bramhastra of Lord Bramha, the Vaishnavastra of Lord Narayana, and the Pashupatastra of Lord Shiva). But to his surprise, all these weapons came back after saluting Lord Lakshmana. Indrajit realised that Lakshmana was not an ordinary human and had met the criteria to defeat Indrajita, i.e. blunder the yagna and not sleep for more than 14 years. Indrajita vanished briefly from the battlefield, returning to Ravana at the royal palace, and reported the developments, proposing that his father make peace with Rama as it's impossible to win over divine incarnations, Lord Shree Rama and Lord Lakshmana. Ravana, blinded with pride, was unrelenting and annoyed, claiming that Indrajita was a coward for having fled the battlefield. This accusation provoked Indrajita who briefly lost his temper, striking fear even at the mighty Ravana's heart before apologizing and clarifying to his father that his primary duty as a son was to serve his father's best interests and that even in the face of death, he would never abandon Ravana. Preparing to return to the battle and knowing that he indeed faced death at the hands of a heavenly incarnation, Indrajita said his last goodbyes to his parents and his wife. He returned to the battlefield and fought Lakshmana with all his skill at both illusion warfare and sorcery. The arrows of Indrajita refused to harm Lakshmana because Lakshmana was the incarnation of Shesha. Lakshmana slew Indrajita by beheading him with the Anjalikastra (in Valmiki Ramayana, the Aindrastra), a celestial weapon associated with Indra, the deity whom Meghanada had famously defeated to earn his title 'Indrajita'. It was possible only because of a curse given to Indrajita by Shesha for marrying his daughter without his permission. Shesha, incarnated as Rama's brother Lakshmana to kill Indrajita, didn't have any sleep for more than fourteen years during their exile so that he would be able to serve Rama and Sita efficiently and meet the criteria to kill Indrajita.

== In popular culture ==
- In the Tamil movie, 'Seetha Jananam or Vedavathi (1941), M.G. Ramachandran, played the Indrajita character.
- Meghnada or Indrajita is the central character in Michael Madhusudan Dutt's Bengali epic poem, Meghnad Badh Kavya (English: The Slaying of Meghnada).
- Vijay Arora portrayed the role of Indrajita in the legendary tv series Ramayan (1987 TV series).
- Indrajita was played by Praphulla Pandey in the 2008 series Ramayan (TV series).
- Ankur Nayyar portrayed the role of Meghanadha in the 2015 series Siya Ke Ram
- Vatsal Sheth played the character of Indrajita in the 2023 Bollywood movie Adipurush.
- Meghnada was played by Rushiraj Pawar in the Shrimad Ramayan in the 2024.
- John Monu portrayed him in the 2024 Hindi film Singham Again.
- Raghav Juyal portrayed him in the 2026 Hindi film, Ramayana: Part 1.

== See also ==
- Valmiki
- Ramayana
- Meghnad Bodh Kavya
- Hindu mythological wars
- Patalkot, India
