= Leander Paes =

Indian professional tennis player (born 1973)

Leander Paes OLY
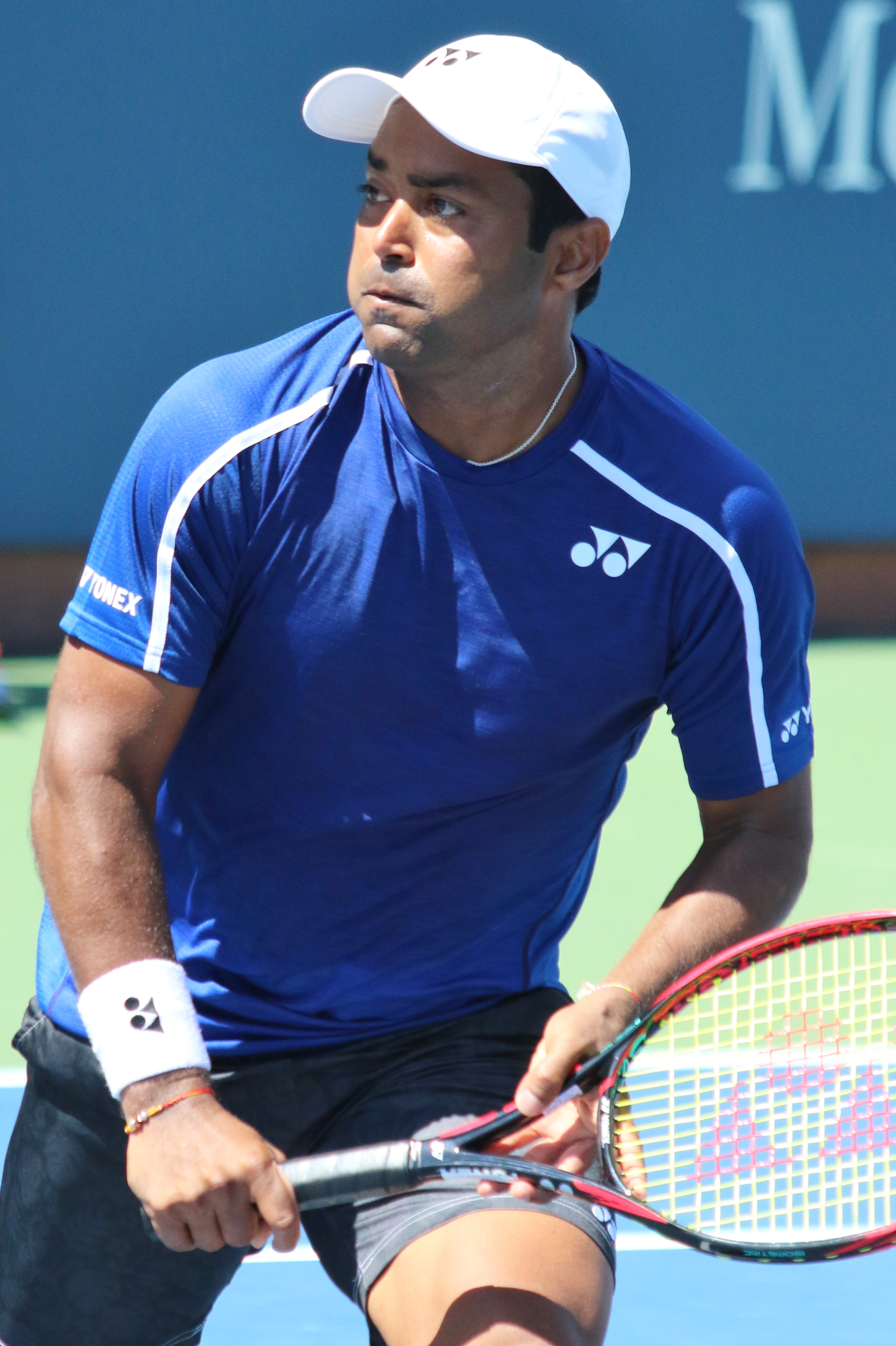
- Paes at the 2016 US Open
- Country (sports): India
- Residence: Mumbai, Maharashtra, India
- Born: 17 June 1973 (age 53) Calcutta, West Bengal, India
- Height: 1.78 m (5 ft 10 in)
- Turned pro: 1991
- Retired: 2020
- Plays: Right-handed (one-handed backhand)
- Prize money: $8,587,586
- Int. Tennis HoF: 2024 (member page)

Singles
- Career record: 101–99
- Career titles: 1
- Highest ranking: No. 73 (24 August 1998)

Grand Slam singles results
- Australian Open: 2R (1997, 2000)
- French Open: 2R (1997)
- Wimbledon: 2R (2001)
- US Open: 3R (1997)

Other tournaments
- Olympic Games: (bronze) (1996)

Doubles
- Career record: 770–457
- Career titles: 55
- Highest ranking: No. 1 (21 June 1999)

Grand Slam doubles results
- Australian Open: W (2012)
- French Open: W (1999, 2001, 2009)
- Wimbledon: W (1999)
- US Open: W (2006, 2009, 2013)

Other doubles tournaments
- Tour Finals: F (1997, 1999, 2000, 2005)
- Olympic Games: SF – 4th (2004)

Mixed doubles
- Career titles: 10

Grand Slam mixed doubles results
- Australian Open: W (2003, 2010, 2015)
- French Open: W (2016)
- Wimbledon: W (1999, 2003, 2010, 2015)
- US Open: W (2008, 2015)

Other mixed doubles tournaments
- Olympic Games: QF (2012)
- Political party: Bharatiya Janata Party (2026–present)
- Other political affiliations: Trinamool Congress (2021–2026)
- Partner: Rhea Pillai (2000–2015)
- Children: 1
- Parents: Vece Paes (father); Jennifer Paes (mother)
- Relatives: Michael Madhusudan Dutt (great-great grandfather)
Medal record
Representing India
Men's tennis
Olympic Games
Bronze medal – third place	1996 Atlanta	Singles
Commonwealth Games
Bronze medal – third place	2010 Delhi	Men's doubles
Asian Games
Gold medal – first place	1994 Hiroshima	Men's doubles
Gold medal – first place	1994 Hiroshima	Men's team
Gold medal – first place	2002 Busan	Men's doubles
Gold medal – first place	2006 Doha	Men's doubles
Gold medal – first place	2006 Doha	Mixed doubles
Bronze medal – third place	1990 Beijing	Men's team
Bronze medal – third place	1994 Hiroshima	Men's singles
Bronze medal – third place	2002 Busan	Mixed doubles
- Last updated on: 1 March 2021 Signature of Leander Paes.

Leander Adrian Paes (/peɪs/ PAYSS; born 17 June 1973) is an Indian former professional tennis player. He is regarded as one of the greatest doubles tennis players of all-time and holds the record for the most doubles wins in the Davis Cup. Paes won eight men's doubles and ten mixed doubles Grand Slam titles. He holds a career Grand Slam in men's doubles and mixed doubles making him one of only three men in the Open era to achieve this distinction and won the rare men's/mixed double at the 1999 Wimbledon Championships. Paes, together with Mahesh Bhupathi, were the first pair in Open era history to reach the men's doubles finals of all 4 Grand Slams in the same calendar year (1999). He is currently the brand ambassador of GS Delhi Aces, a team owned by Guru Samruddhi House of Investments in the Tennis Premier League.

His mixed doubles Wimbledon title in 2015 made him the second man (after Rod Laver) to win Wimbledon titles in three different decades. He repeated the feat by winning a Roland Garros title in three different decades with his mixed doubles title in 2016.

Paes received the Major Dhyan Chand Khel Ratna award, India's highest sporting honor, in 1996–97; the Arjuna Award in 1990; the Padma Shri award in 2001; and India's third-highest civilian award, the Padma Bhushan prize, in January 2014 for his outstanding contributions to tennis. He won a bronze medal for India in men's singles at the 1996 Atlanta Olympic Games making him the first Asian in Olympic history to win a tennis medal and the only Indian to date. He competed in consecutive Olympics from 1992 to 2016, making him the only tennis player to compete in seven Olympic Games. He is also the most decorated male tennis player in Asian Games history with 5 Gold and 3 Bronze medals. He was won medals in every category (singles, doubles, mixed doubles and team event) and is the highest Indian gold medal-winning athlete across all sports in Asian Games history.

He is a former Davis Cup team captain, where in addition his Davis Cup all-time doubles win record with 45 victories, (and a record unbeaten winning streak of 24 matches), he also has the fourth highest number of overall wins in Davis Cup history with 93 total victories across singles and doubles in a record 30-year career for India with match wins in 4 different decades-making him the only player to achieve that. He played in World Team Tennis for the Washington Kastles. He was on the 2009, 2011, 2012, 2013, 2014, and 2015 championship teams making him the most decorated male tennis in World Team Tennis history and was named Male MVP for 2009 and 2011. Paes retired from professional tennis in 2020, following his last Davis Cup tie in Croatia, with a record 1295 weeks spent ranked in the Top 100 in men's doubles.

On 20 July 2024, he was inducted into the International Tennis Hall of Fame in Newport, Rhode Island. Paes subsequently became the first Asian man to be inducted into the hall.

== Early life ==
Leander Adrian Paes was born in Calcutta, India on 17 June 1973. His father, Vece Paes, was a field hockey player of Goan Catholic descent. His mother, Jennifer Paes, was a Bengali basketball player from Calcutta. The family is Christian. He studied at La Martiniere Calcutta, Madras Christian College Higher Secondary School and at St. Xavier's College. His parents were both athletes. Vece was a midfield squad member in the bronze medal-winning Indian field hockey team at the 1972 Munich Olympics although he did not personally receive a medal as he did not take to the field in any of India's matches. His mother captained the Indian basketball team in the 1980 Asian basketball championship. Paes is a direct descendant of Bengali poet Michael Madhusudan Dutta through his mother.

Paes enrolled with the Britannia Amritraj Tennis Academy in Madras (Chennai) in 1985, where he was coached by Dave O'Meara. Paes earned international fame when he won the 1990 Wimbledon Junior title and reached No. 1 in the junior world rankings at age 17.

== Career ==
=== Early career (1991–1997) ===
Paes first won titles at the Junior US Open and the Junior Wimbledon. He turned professional in 1991. He became number 1 in the world junior rankings. In 1992, he reached the quarter finals of the doubles event in the 1992 Barcelona Olympics with Ramesh Krishnan.

At the 1996 Atlanta Olympics he beat Fernando Meligeni to win the bronze medal, the first Indian to win an individual medal since KD Jadhav won bronze at the 1952 Helsinki Olympics. Paes cited the match as one of his greatest performances, in part because his wrist was severely injured. He was awarded the highest sporting honor by the government of India, the Khel Ratna in 1996.

His first successful year in the ATP circuit came in 1993, when he partnered with Sébastien Lareau to reach the US Open doubles semifinal. After a moderate season in 1994, he reached the quarter-finals of the 1995 Australian Open doubles with Kevin Ullyett. From 1996, he partnered with fellow Indian Mahesh Bhupathi. Their first year was not successful, especially in the Grand Slams, reaching the round of 32 only at Wimbledon. 1997 proved to be a much better year for the team, reaching the US Open semifinals. Paes climbed the doubles ranking from no. 89 at the beginning of the year to no. 14 at year-end. That year he made his best singles performance in a Grand Slam, losing in the third round of the 1997 US Open to Cédric Pioline after beating Carlos Costa and Arnaud Boetsch.

=== Rise in doubles (1998–2002) ===
Paes/Bhupathi grew stronger in 1998, and reached the semifinals of three Grand Slams, the Australian Open, the French Open and the US Open. Leander Paes had two of his biggest singles results. The first one came by winning his only ATP singles title at Newport, and the second was beating Pete Sampras 6–3, 6–4 at the New Haven ATP tournament in their only meeting. In 1999, the duo reached the finals of all four Grand Slams, winning Wimbledon and the French Open, becoming the first Indians to win a doubles event at a Grand Slam. Paes teamed up with Lisa Raymond to win the mixed doubles event at Wimbledon. The year marked his ascent to the no. 1 doubles ranking. The following year, Paes partnered with Sébastien Lareau for the Australian and Jan Siemerink for the French, losing in the first round on both occasions. Paes again teamed with Bhupathi for the US Open, but lost in the first round again.

The duo had a disappointing second round exit to Australian duo of Todd Woodbridge and Mark Woodforde at the Sydney Olympics. Paes was given the honor of carrying the Indian Flag at the opening ceremony.

In spite of winning the French Open in 2001, Bhupathi/Paes had first-round exits in the other three Grand Slams. Paes was awarded the Padmashri by the Government of India in 2001. The duo of Paes and Bhupathi won the gold medal at the 2002 Asian Games in Busan. In 2002, Leander paired up with Michael Hill with moderate success.

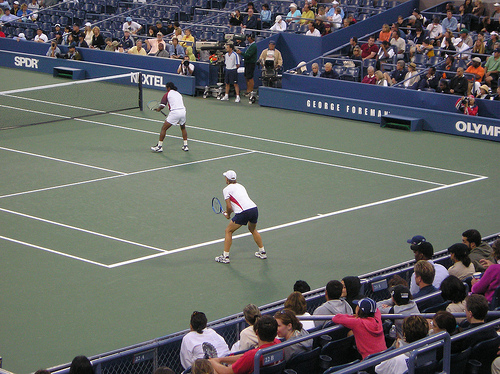
Leander Paes and Martina Navratilova pairing up in a mixed doubles event

=== 2003–2007 ===
After 2003 Paes increasingly focused on doubles. He won the mixed doubles events at the Australian and Wimbledon with Martina Navratilova, both in 2003. Weeks later, Paes was admitted to the MD Anderson Cancer Center for a suspected brain tumour that was later found to be neurocysticercosis, a parasitic brain infection. He had to miss the US Open, but recovered by the end of that year.

In the 2004 Athens Olympic Games, he paired up with Bhupathi, failing again at the semifinals stage. His next Grand Slam success was in the US Open doubles event in 2006 with Martin Damm. Paes led the Indian tennis team at the Doha Asian Games in 2006 and won two golds in the men's doubles (with Bhupathi) and mixed doubles (with Sania Mirza). Paes maintained his doubles ranking in the top 20 in the world between 2005 and 2007. With wins in the Rotterdam and Indian Wells, Paes took his doubles tally to 38.

=== 2008 ===
Paes/Bhupathi took part in men's doubles at the 2008 Beijing Olympics. They were eliminated in the quarter-finals by Roger Federer and Stanislas Wawrinka, who went on to win gold. With Cara Black he won the 2008 US Open mixed doubles title.

=== 2009 ===
In 2009, he won the French Open and US Open Men's doubles titles with Lukáš Dlouhý and was the runner-up in mixed at the US Open.

=== 2010 ===
He began the 2010 season in good form, again winning the Australian Open mixed doubles title with Cara Black. This was the pair's third consecutive Grand Slam final and the fourth overall.

=== 2012 ===
Paes started the year pairing with Radek Štěpánek winning the Australian Open men's doubles beating the Bryan brothers and completed his Career Grand Slam in men's doubles. Paes then went on to complete at hattrick of wins at the Miami Masters with his 3rd consecutive win pairing with Štěpánek. Paes and Štěpánek's 2012 Wimbledon tournament ended when the duo lost to Ivan Dodig and Marcelo Melo. Paes and Elena Vesnina reached the finals of the Wimbledon mixed doubles after beating Bob Bryan and Liezel Huber, 7–5, 3–6, 6–3 on 7 July. They lost in the final to Lisa Raymond and Mike Bryan 3–6, 7–5, 4–6.

In the 2012 Summer Olympics, the Indian pair (Vishnu Vardhan) lost to French team Michaël Llodra and Jo-Wilfried Tsonga, 6–7, 6–4, 3–6.

Paes and Štěpánek advanced to the finals at the 2012 US Open after their Spanish opponents, Marcel Granollers and Marc López, retired because of injury. However the duo lost in the final of US Open 2012 to the Bryan brothers.

Paes and Štěpánek began the ATP World Tour Finals with a win against Pakistan's Aisam-ul-Haq Qureshi and Dutchman Jean Julien Rojer, 6–4, 7–5. and avenged their loss to the Bryans and topped their group with 3 wins. They made it to the semifinals, where they were eliminated by eventual runners-up Bhupathi and Rohan Bopanna.

=== 2013 ===
Paes/Štěpánek won the 2013 US Open, defeating Alexander Peya and Bruno Soares 6–1, 6–3. This was Paes' 3rd US Open men's doubles title and 14th Grand Slam title. He became the oldest man to win a Grand Slam title and the first ever aged above 40 years. In January 2014, the Government of India announced its 3rd Highest Civilian Award Padma Bhushan for Paes.

=== 2014 ===
Paes won the 2014 Malaysian Open men's doubles with Marcin Matkowski. and later went on to make the semi-finals of Wimbledon in men's doubles with Štěpánek

=== 2015 ===
Paes started his 25th season on the ATP World Tour by partnering with Klaasen to reach the Chennai final, where the team lost to Lu/Marray. On 17 January, he won his 55th tour-level title in his 93rd final at Auckland, again with Klaasen. The team recorded three-match tie break victories en route to the final. With the win, Paes had won at least one trophy every season since 1997.

On 1 February, Paes captured his seventh Grand Slam mixed doubles crown at the 2015 Australian Open with Martina Hingis. It was his 15th major crown overall and his third mixed doubles triumph at Melbourne Park. The pair beat defending champions Daniel Nestor and Kristina Mladenovic in the final. As No. 7 seed with Klaasen in men's doubles, Paes lost to eventual champions Bolelli/Fognini in the second round.

At the 2015 French Open, Paes started a new partnership with Daniel Nestor. The pair crashed out in the third round; however, Paes became just the seventh male player in Open Era to complete 700 doubles wins.

At Wimbledon 2015, Paes again teamed up with Hingis to win the mixed doubles championship. The final 6–1, 6–1 score against fifth seeds Alexander Peya and Tímea Babos came after only 41 minutes. Paes/Nestor reached the third round. By winning his 4th Wimbledon mixed doubles title, Paes shared the record for men's titles in the open era with Owen Davidson.

On 12 September 2015, Paes won the mixed doubles at the 2015 US Open with Hingis, defeating Sam Querrey and Bethanie Mattek-Sands in three sets.

=== 2016 ===
On 3 June 2016, Leander Paes completed his Career Grand Slam in mixed by winning the 2016 French Open with Hingis, thus joining an elite league of players. He broke Davidson's record for most Grand Slam mixed doubles titles. Paes qualified for the 2016 Summer Olympics in Men's doubles and partnered with Rohan Bopanna. They lost in the first round to the Polish pair of Marcin Matkowski and Łukasz Kubot. He later paired up with Andre Begemann, where they reached the final in the Winston-Salem Open. This pair lost in the first round of the 2016 US Open. He turned up for the Davis Cup against Spain with Saketh Myneni, losing to Rafael Nadal and Marc López in 4 sets.

=== 2017 ===
Paes played in the 2017 season with his 111th partner, André Sá. The duo lost to the Indian pair of Purav Raja and Divij Sharan in the first round of Aircel Chennai Open in straight sets. With this loss, Paes moved down to 64th in doubles ranks. Though India won their Davis Cup tie against New Zealand, Paes and his last-minute partner, Vishnu Vardhan, lost to the New Zealanders Artem Sitak/Michael Venus. Paes and Rohan Bopanna were kept as reserves by new, non-playing captain Mahesh Bhupathi for the tie against Uzbekistan. Eventually, Paes was dropped from the final four, which created controversy. Paes reached the semis of the Dubai Open and at Delray Beach. Paes then played a series of challenger events, never getting his ranking above 49th. He played with Adil Shamasdin, Scott Lipsky, and Purav Raja.

=== 2018 ===
Paes continued his partnership with Raja, losing the Maharashtra Open in the first round to defending champions Bopanna/Jeevan Nedunchezhiyan. In the Australian Open, Paes/Raja lost in the round of 16. Paes along with James Cerretani finished as runner up in the Dubai Open. Paes was recalled to India's Davis Cup squad to play against China. On 7 April 2018, Paes became the most successful player in Davis Cup history with his 43rd doubles victory. After going 0–2 down, Paes/Bopanna scripted India's comeback and in the end, India won the tie 3–2. After this, Paes skipped clay and grass court seasons. Paes was selected for the 2018 Asian Games, but the day before the Games started, he opted out citing the lack of a doubles specialist to accompany him. Paes/Cerretani played in several Challenger tournaments, before losing in the first round of the US Open. Paes also played Challengers with Miguel Ángel Reyes-Varela.

=== 2019 ===
Paes/Reyes-Varela started the 2019 season at the Maharashtra Open. The duo lost a close quarter-final to the eventual champions, Bopanna/Divij Sharan, 17–15 in a match tie-break. Paes/Reyes-Varela then finished as runners-up in the Da Nang Challenger before losing in the first round of the Australian Open. During the season, Paes made the semi-finals of three ATP 250 tournaments (Montpellier, Marrakesh and Lyon) with Benoit Paire. He became the oldest ATP Tour semi-finalist since 2006 when he reached the semi-finals of the Hall of Fame Championship with Marcus Daniell in July 2019.

=== Davis Cup ===
Paes started his Davis Cup career in 1990, when he partnered Zeeshan Ali in doubles to beat the Japanese team in a five-set encounter. He played a key role on the Indian team that reached the World Group from 1991 to 1998. He was part of the Indian team that reached the semifinals 1993 with wins against Switzerland and France, eventually losing to Australia. In singles, his major wins came against the French duo of Arnaud Boetsch and Henri Leconte in 1993, Wayne Ferreira in 1994, and Goran Ivanišević in 1995 when India defeated Croatia, beating Jan Siemerink in 1996 to defeat Netherlands, and Jiří Novák in 1997. He teamed up with Bhupathi to beat Hiršzon/Ivanisevic of Croatia in 1995, Damm/Korda of the Czech Republic in 1997, Massú/Ríos of Chile in 1997, Broad/Henman in 1998, and Aspelin/Björkman of Sweden in 2005. In 2007, Leander had three wins (two doubles and one singles) and no losses.

In 1993, he defeated No. 25 Arnaud Boetsch in straight sets on clay. Paes defeated Henri Leconte in the same week, and although Ramesh Krishnan won the tie-breaker against Rodolphe Gilbert, it was Paes who put that match over the top.

In 1994, he beat World No. 13 Wayne Ferreira in straight sets, but lost the overall tie.

=== Year-end finals ===
Paes qualified for appeared with Bhupathi in six season finales.

Paes played at the year-end championships with Bhupathi each year from 1997 to 2000, as well as in 2002 and 2011, reaching three finals. In 1997 they lost the final to Rick Leach and Jonathan Stark. They lost 1999 final to Sébastien Lareau and Alex O'Brien. In 2000, they lost the final to Donald Johnson and Pieter Norval.

== Playing style ==
Leander has been described as having a strange playing style by Andre Agassi. He varies his play as the match goes on; he is one of the best volleyers and prolific at the drop shot. His volleying techniques were learnt from former Indian player Akhtar Ali. He hits a one-handed backhand, which he drives rarely, preferring instead to slice when returning serve or rallying from his backhand.

== Partnership with Mahesh Bhupathi ==
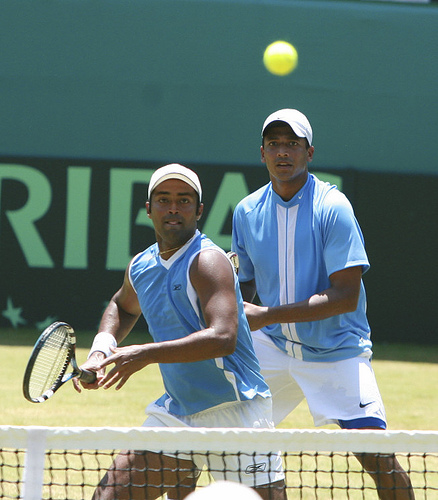
Leander Paes and his longtime doubles partner Mahesh Bhupathi

The duo of Leander Paes and Mahesh Bhupathi was nicknamed the ″Indian Express″. Paes' off-and-on partnership with Bhupathi drew constant media attention in their home country. In the 2006 Asian Games, a loss to the Chinese Taipei team in the team event led Paes to question Bhupathi's commitment to Team India. He once stated in an interview that although he and Bhupathi are friends, he did not consider pairing with his former teammate. However, for the 2008 Beijing Olympics, they reunited for their country, losing in the quarterfinals to eventual champions Federer/Wawrinka.

In 2011, the pair won doubles at the Chennai Open. They reunited to play in a Grand Slam Tournament after nine years and claimed runners-up in the 2011 Australian Open and reached the semifinals in the year-end championships.

The Indian duo has a 303–103 career record together. They have a high success rate against various top teams. They have a Davis Cup record for the longest doubles winning streak, with 24 straight wins.

Paes paired with Vishnu Vardhan at the London Olympics 2012, following Bhupathi and Bopanna's refusal. Paes threatened to withdraw from the Olympics rather than play with Vardhan, whose world ranking was 296, but withdrew the threat a week later. Paes and Vardhan reached the second round of the tournament, losing to French silver medalists Llodra/Tsonga.

In 2021, Zee5 produced a documentary called Break Point, showing the ups and downs in the relationship between Paes and Bhupathi.

== Other activities ==
In 2010, he joined the Board of Directors of Olympic Gold Quest, a foundation co-founded by Geet Sethi and Prakash Padukone to support talented Indian athletes.

=== Acting career ===
Paes made his film debut in Ashok Kohli's Rajdhani Express, a socio-political thriller.

==== Filmography ====
Year	Title	Role	Notes
2013	Rajdhani Express	Keshav	Debut film

=== Political career ===
Paes joined the Trinamool Congress in Goa on 29 October 2021 and campaigned for the party for the Goa Assembly elections. On 31 March 2026, he joined the Bharatiya Janata Party ahead of the West Bengal Assembly elections.

== Personal life ==
Paes had a live-in-relationship with British model Rhea Pillai in the 2000s. The couple has a daughter, Aiyana, born in 2005.

His daughter, Aiyana Paes is also a tennis player who represents Great Britain.

== Significant finals ==
By winning the 2012 Australian Open title, Paes achieved the career Grand Slam in mens doubles. By winning the 2016 Roland Garros mixed doubles title, he completed the Career Grand Slam set in both mens and mixed doubles becoming only the 3rd man in the Open era to do so.

=== Doubles: 16 (8 titles, 8 runner-ups) ===
Result	Year	Championship	Surface	Partner	Opponents	Score
Loss	1999	Australian Open	Hard	(India) Mahesh Bhupathi	(Sweden) Jonas Björkman (Australia) Patrick Rafter	3–6, 6–4, 4–6, 7–6^{(12–10)}, 4–6
Win	1999	French Open	Clay	(India) Mahesh Bhupathi	(Croatia) Goran Ivanišević (United States) Jeff Tarango	6–2, 7–5
Win	1999	Wimbledon	Grass	(India) Mahesh Bhupathi	(Netherlands) Paul Haarhuis (United States) Jared Palmer	6–7^{(10–12)}, 6–3, 6–4, 7–6^{(7–4)}
Loss	1999	US Open	Hard	(India) Mahesh Bhupathi	(Canada) Sébastien Lareau (United States) Alex O'Brien	6–7, 4–6
Win	2001	French Open (2)	Clay	(India) Mahesh Bhupathi	(Czech Republic) Petr Pála (Czech Republic) Pavel Vízner	7–6, 6–3
Loss	2004	US Open	Hard	(Czech Republic) David Rikl	(The Bahamas) Mark Knowles (Canada) Daniel Nestor	3–6, 3–6
Loss	2006	Australian Open	Hard	(Czech Republic) Martin Damm	(United States) Bob Bryan (United States) Mike Bryan	6–4, 3–6, 4–6
Win	2006	US Open	Hard	(Czech Republic) Martin Damm	(Sweden) Jonas Björkman (Belarus) Max Mirnyi	6–7^{(5–7)}, 6–4, 6–3
Loss	2008	US Open	Hard	(Czech Republic) Lukáš Dlouhý	(United States) Bob Bryan (United States) Mike Bryan	6–7^{(5–7)}, 6–7^{(10–12)}
Win	2009	French Open (3)	Clay	(Czech Republic) Lukáš Dlouhý	(South Africa) Wesley Moodie (Belgium) Dick Norman	3–6, 6–3, 6–2
Win	2009	US Open (2)	Hard	(Czech Republic) Lukáš Dlouhý	(India) Mahesh Bhupathi (The Bahamas) Mark Knowles	3–6, 6–3, 6–2
Loss	2010	French Open	Clay	(Czech Republic) Lukáš Dlouhý	(Serbia) Nenad Zimonjić (Canada) Daniel Nestor	5–7, 2–6
Loss	2011	Australian Open	Hard	(India) Mahesh Bhupathi	(United States) Bob Bryan (United States) Mike Bryan	3–6, 4–6
Win	2012	Australian Open	Hard	(Czech Republic) Radek Štěpánek	(United States) Bob Bryan (United States) Mike Bryan	7–6^{(7–1)}, 6–2
Loss	2012	US Open	Hard	(Czech Republic) Radek Štěpánek	(United States) Bob Bryan (United States) Mike Bryan	3–6, 4–6
Win	2013	US Open (3)	Hard	(Czech Republic) Radek Štěpánek	(Austria) Alexander Peya (Brazil) Bruno Soares	6–1, 6–3

=== Mixed doubles: 18 (10 titles, 8 runner-ups) ===
Result	Year	Championship	Surface	Partner	Opponents	Score
Win	1999	Wimbledon	Grass	(United States) Lisa Raymond	(Russia) Anna Kournikova (Sweden) Jonas Björkman	6–4, 3–6, 6–3
Loss	2001	US Open	Hard	(United States) Lisa Raymond	(Australia) Rennae Stubbs (Australia) Todd Woodbridge	6–4, 5–7, [11–9]
Win	2003	Australian Open	Hard	(United States) Martina Navratilova	(Greece) Eleni Daniilidou (Australia) Todd Woodbridge	6–4, 7–5
Win	2003	Wimbledon (2)	Grass	(United States) Martina Navratilova	(Russia) Anastassia Rodionova (Israel) Andy Ram	6–3, 6–3
Loss	2004	Australian Open	Hard	(United States) Martina Navratilova	(Russia) Elena Bovina (Serbia and Montenegro) Nenad Zimonjić	6–1, 7–6
Loss	2005	French Open	Clay	(United States) Martina Navratilova	(Slovakia) Daniela Hantuchová (France) Fabrice Santoro	3–6, 6–3, 6–2
Loss	2007	US Open	Hard	(United States) Meghann Shaughnessy	(Belarus) Victoria Azarenka (Belarus) Max Mirnyi	6–4, 7–6^{(8–6)}
Win	2008	US Open	Hard	(Zimbabwe) Cara Black	(United States) Liezel Huber (United Kingdom) Jamie Murray	7–6, 6–4
Loss	2009	Wimbledon	Grass	(Zimbabwe) Cara Black	(Germany) Anna-Lena Grönefeld (The Bahamas) Mark Knowles	7–5, 6–3
Loss	2009	US Open	Hard	(Zimbabwe) Cara Black	(United States) Carly Gullickson (United States) Travis Parrot	6–2, 6–4
Win	2010	Australian Open (2)	Hard	(Zimbabwe) Cara Black	(Russia) Ekaterina Makarova (Czech Republic) Jaroslav Levinský	7–5, 6–3
Win	2010	Wimbledon (3)	Grass	(Zimbabwe) Cara Black	(United States) Lisa Raymond (South Africa) Wesley Moodie	6–4, 7–6
Loss	2012	Australian Open	Hard	(Russia) Elena Vesnina	(United States) Bethanie Mattek-Sands (Romania) Horia Tecău	3–6, 7–5, [3–10]
Loss	2012	Wimbledon	Grass	(Russia) Elena Vesnina	(United States) Lisa Raymond (United States) Mike Bryan	3–6, 7–5, 4–6
Win	2015	Australian Open (3)	Hard	(Switzerland) Martina Hingis	(France) Kristina Mladenovic (Canada) Daniel Nestor	6–4, 6–3
Win	2015	Wimbledon (4)	Grass	(Switzerland) Martina Hingis	(Hungary) Tímea Babos (Austria) Alexander Peya	6–1, 6–1
Win	2015	US Open (2)	Hard	(Switzerland) Martina Hingis	(United States) Bethanie Mattek-Sands (United States) Sam Querrey	6–4, 3–6, [10–7]
Win	2016	French Open	Clay	(Switzerland) Martina Hingis	(India) Sania Mirza (Croatia) Ivan Dodig	4–6, 6–4, [10–8]

=== Olympic medal matches ===
==== Singles: 1 (1 bronze medal) ====
Bronze medal final

Result	Year	Championship	Surface	Opponent	Score
Bronze	1996	Atlanta	Hard	(Brazil) Fernando Meligeni	3–6, 6–2, 6–4

==== Doubles: 1 ====
Result	Year	Championship	Surface	Partner	Opponents	Score
4th place	2004	Athens	Hard	(India) Mahesh Bhupathi	(Croatia) Mario Ančić (Croatia) Ivan Ljubičić	6–7^{(5–7)}, 6–4, 14–16

== Performance timeline ==
Key
W	F	SF	QF	#R	RR	Q#	P#	DNQ	A	Z#	PO	G	S	B	NMS	NTI	P	NH

(W) winner; (F) finalist; (SF) semifinalist; (QF) quarterfinalist; (#R) rounds 4, 3, 2, 1; (RR) round-robin stage; (Q#) qualification round; (P#) preliminary round; (DNQ) did not qualify; (A) absent; (Z#) Davis/Fed Cup Zonal Group (with number indication) or (PO) play-off; (G) gold, (S) silver or (B) bronze Olympic/Paralympic medal; (NMS) not a Masters tournament; (NTI) not a Tier I tournament; (P) postponed; (NH) not held; (SR) strike rate (events won / competed); (W–L) win–loss record.

=== Singles ===
Tournament	1991	1992	1993	1994	1995	1996	1997	1998	1999	2000	2001	SR	W–L
Grand Slam tournaments
Australian Open	A	A	Q1	Q2	1R	A	2R	1R	1R	2R	Q3	0 / 5	2–5
French Open	A	A	Q2	A	A	A	2R	Q3	Q2	Q1	A	0 / 1	1–1
Wimbledon	Q2	Q1	Q1	Q3	A	1R	1R	1R	1R	A	2R	0 / 5	1–5
US Open	A	Q3	Q2	1R	Q3	2R	3R	1R	Q1	A	A	0 / 4	3–4
Win–loss	0–0	0–0	0–0	0–1	0–1	1–2	4–4	0–3	0–2	1–1	1–1	0 / 15	7–15
National representation
Summer Olympics	NH	1R	Not Held			SF-B	Not Held			1R	NH	0 / 3	5–3
Career statistics
Titles / Finals	0 / 0	0 / 0	0 / 0	0 / 0	0 / 0	0 / 0	0 / 0	1 / 1	0 / 0	0 / 0	0 / 0	1 / 1	
Year-end ranking	278	194	260	139	130	129	122	91	142	188	299		

=== Doubles ===
Tournament	1990	1991	1992	1993	1994	1995	1996	1997	1998	1999	2000	2001	2002	2003	2004	2005	2006	2007	2008	2009	2010	2011	2012	2013	2014	2015	2016	2017	2018	2019	2020	SR	W–L
Grand Slam tournaments
Australian Open	A	A	A	A	2R	QF	A	1R	SF	F	1R	1R	2R	QF	1R	A	F	3R	2R	SF	QF	F	W	1R	QF	2R	1R	1R	3R	1R	A	1 / 24	49–23
French Open	A	A	A	A	A	A	A	2R	SF	W	1R	W	SF	SF	2R	QF	1R	2R	3R	W	F	2R	2R	2R	A	3R	QF	2R	A	2R	A	3 / 21	53–18
Wimbledon	A	A	Q1	1R	3R	A	2R	1R	2R	W	A	1R	1R	SF	2R	QF	SF	QF	SF	1R	2R	2R	3R	SF	SF	3R	2R	1R	A	1R	NH	1 / 24	44–23
US Open	A	A	A	SF	2R	1R	Q1	SF	SF	F	1R	1R	2R	A	F	1R	W	1R	F	W	1R	QF	F	W	3R	2R	1R	2R	1R	1R	A	3 / 25	59–22
Win–loss	0–0	0–0	0–0	4–2	4–3	3–2	1–1	5–4	13–4	22–2	0–3	6–3	6–4	11–3	7–4	6–3	15–3	6–4	12–4	16–2	9–4	10–4	14–3	11–3	9–3	6–4	4–4	2–4	2–2	1–4	0–0	8 / 94	205–86

=== Mixed doubles ===
Tournament	1994	1995	1996	1997	1998	1999	2000	2001	2002	2003	2004	2005	2006	2007	2008	2009	2010	2011	2012	2013	2014	2015	2016	2017	2018	2019	2020	SR
Grand Slam tournaments
Australian Open	A	A	A	A	A	1R	1R	2R	2R	W	F	A	SF	QF	2R	2R	W	2R	F	2R	QF	W	QF	QF	A	2R	2R	3 / 20
French Open	A	A	A	3R	2R	QF	3R	QF	2R	2R	2R	F	QF	QF	1R	2R	QF	QF	SF	2R	A	2R	W	1R	A	A	NH	1 / 20
Wimbledon	3R	A	1R	QF	QF	W	A	3R	QF	W	3R	A	QF	QF	2R	F	W	QF	F	2R	2R	W	3R	1R	A	1R	NH	4 / 22
US Open	A	1R	A	1R	1R	2R	1R	F	2R	A	SF	QF	1R	F	W	F	QF	SF	QF	A	QF	W	2R	A	A	A	NH	2 / 19
SR	0 / 1	0 / 1	0 / 1	0 / 3	0 / 3	1 / 4	0 / 3	0 / 4	0 / 4	2 / 3	0 / 4	0 / 2	0 / 4	0 / 4	1 / 4	0 / 4	2 / 4	0 / 4	0 / 4	0 / 3	0 / 3	3 / 4	1 / 4	0 / 3	0 / 0	0 / 1	0 / 1	10 / 81
National representation
Summer Olympics	Not held																		QF	Not held			A	Not held				0 / 1

Olympic Games
Preceded by Pargat Singh	Flagbearer for India; Sydney 2000	Succeeded by Anju Bobby George
