= Purandaradasa (film) =

1937 film

- Directed by: B. Chawan
- Produced by: Nanjundappa
- Starring: G. Krishnaswamy Iyengar; Tripuramba; J. T. Balakrishnarao
- Music by: Bellave Narahari Shastri
- Production company: Devi Films
- Distributed by: Devi Films
- Release date: 1937
- Country: India
- Languages: Kannada; Tamil

Purandaradasa is a 1937 Indian Kannada-language film, directed by B. Chawan and produced by Nanjundappa. The film stars G. Krishnaswamy Iyengar, Tripuramba and J. T. Balakrishnarao. Bellave Narahari Shastri was the music director.

The film was made in Tamil as Bhaktha Purandaradoss, with Tripuramba reprising her lead role opposite G. Kalyanarama Bhagavathar, who played the male lead. It was released on 14 October 1937.

== Cast ==
- G. Krishnaswamy Iyengar (Kannada) / G. Kalyanarama Bhagavathar (Tamil) as Purandara Dasa
- Tripuramba
- J. T. Balakrishnarao

== Soundtrack ==
The music was composed by Sundarrajan.

No.	Song	Singers	Lyrics	Length (m:ss)
1	"Athi Mudadali"	Kamala Bai, Subbaiah Naidu	Ramakrishna	02:54
2	"Bhale Joojugaarnala"	Lakshmi Bai	Ramakrishna	02:40
3	"Idhey Mahasudhina"	Lakshmi Bai, Subbaiah Naidu	Ramakrishna	03:06
4	"Kaamanu Kaaduva Kothiya"	P. Nageswara Rao	Nagendra Rao	03:05
5	"Biridha Hoogala"	Veeranna	Seshagiri Rao	03:11
6	"Jeevana Naataka"	Mohan Kumar	Seshagiri Rao	02:18
7	"Meenankaroopana"	B. Jayamma	Seshagiri Rao	03:13
8	"Suma Maale"	B. Jayamma, S. V. Venkataraman	Seshagiri Rao	02:41
9	"Paahi Shubhacharithe"	Raja	Ramakrishna	03:00
10	"Shanthiye Jeevana"	Raja	Ramakrishna	03:15
