= Chamanlal Doongaji =

Indian businessman, film producer and distributor

Chamanlal Doongaji was an Indian businessman, film producer and distributor known for producing the first-ever talking film in Kannada, Sati Sulochana. He founded a film distribution company named South India Movietone in 1932.

He was from a Marwari family and was based in Bengaluru.
