= Michael Madhusudan Dutt =

Bengali poet and dramatist (1825–1873)

- মাইকেল মধুসূদন দত্ত
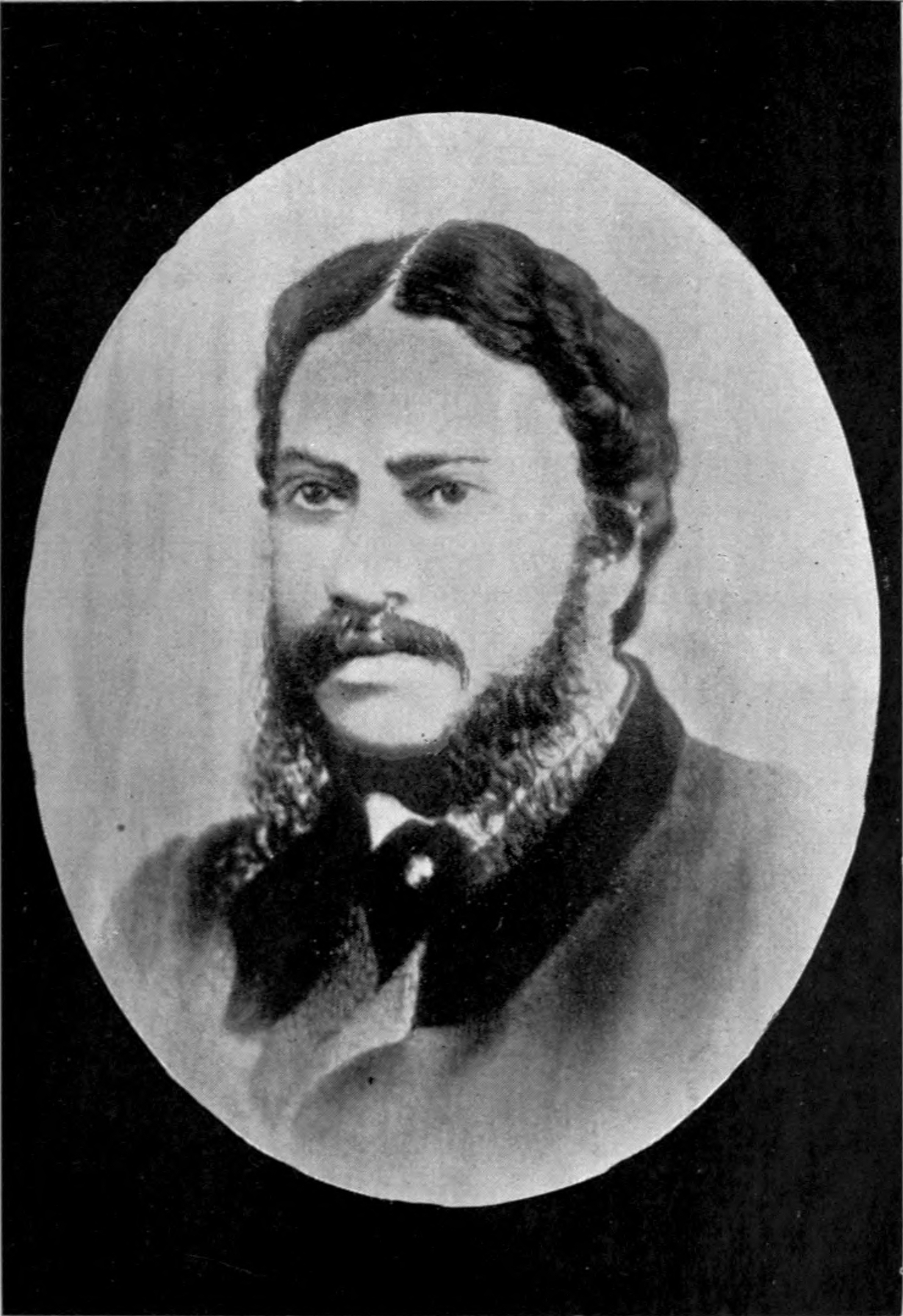
- Portrait of Dutt, c. 1907
- Pronunciation: [mai̯kel mod̪ʱuʃud̪ɔn d̪ɔt̪ːo]
- Born: Madhusudan Dutt; 25 January 1824; Sagardari, Jessore, Bengal Presidency, British India (now Bangladesh)
- Died: 29 June 1873 (aged 49); Calcutta, Bengal Presidency, British India (now West Bengal, India)
- Resting place: Lower Circular Road cemetery 22.547837°N 88.363659°E
- Citizenship: British Indian
- Education: Hindu College; Bishop's College; Gray's Inn
- Occupations: Poet; playwright; essayist; translator
- Works: Bibliography
- Spouse: Rebecca Thompson McTavish (m. 1848; sep. 1856)
- Partner: Emilia Henrietta Sophie White (1858–1873)
- Children: 8 (Note: including a stillborn)
- Parents: Rajnarayan Dutt (father); Jahnavi Devi (mother)
- Relatives: Jennifer Dutton (great-granddaughter); Leander Paes (great-great grandson)
- Honours: See below
- Writing career
- Pen name: Timothy Penpoem
- Language: Bengali; English
- Years active: 1849–1873
- Period: Modern
- Genres: Epic poetry; narrative poetry; lyric poetry; sonnet; verse drama; farce; comedy; tragedy; prose; translation
- Subjects: Hindu mythology; Greek mythology; love; romance; heroism; war; colonialism; exile; patriotism
- Notable works: Śarmmiṣṭhā Nāṭak (1859); Tilōttamāsambhav Kāvya (1860); Mēghanādbadh Kāvya (1861); Brajāṅganā Kāvya (1861); Vīrāṅganā Kāvya (1862); Caturddaśpadī Kavitāvalī (1866)
- Movement: Bengal Renaissance

Michael Madhusudan Dutt (Note: /ˈmaɪkəl ˌmædhuːˈsuːdən dʌt/; Bengali: মাইকেল মধুসূদন দত্ত, pronounced [mai̯kel mod̪ʱuʃud̪ɔn d̪ɔt̪ːo].) (Bengali: মাইকেল মধুসূদন দত্ত, pronounced [mai̯kel mod̪ʱuʃud̪ɔn d̪ɔt̪ːo]; 25 January 1824 – 29 June 1873) was a Bengali poet and playwright. He is considered one of the pioneers of Bengali literature.

== Early life ==
Madhusudan was born in Sagardari, a village in Keshabpur Upazila, Jessore District of Bengal (present-day Bangladesh), to a Hindu family. His father was Rajnarayan Dutta, who was a lawyer and his mother was Jahnabi Devi. His family, being reasonably well-off, ensured that Madhusudan received an education in the English language and additional tutorship in English at home. Rajnarayan had intended for this Western education to open the doors for a government position for his son.

== College and religious conversion ==
After he finished his education in Sagardari at roughly the age of fifteen, Rajnarayan sent Madhusudhan to Calcutta to attend Hindu College with the eventual aim of becoming a barrister. At Hindu College, Michael studied under a westernized curriculum in a university which had been expressly founded for the "uplift of the natives". The college required all students to wear Western clothing, eat European cuisine with cutlery, learn British songs, and speak exclusively in English—with the aim of creating an anglicized Indian middle class to serve as officials in the colonial administration.

During his time at Hindu College, Madhusudhan developed an aversion to Indian culture and a deep yearning to be accepted into European culture. He expressed these sentiments in one of his poems. An early and formative influence on Dutt was his teacher at Hindu College, David Lester Richardson. Richardson was a poet and inspired in Dutt a love of English poetry, particularly by that of Byron. Dutt began writing English poetry aged around 17 years, sending his works to publications in England, including Blackwood's Magazine and Bentley's Miscellany. They were, however, never accepted for publication. This was also when he began a correspondence with his friend, Gour Das Bysack, which today forms the bulk of sources on his life.

On 9 February 1843, Madhusudan embraced Christianity at the Old Mission Church, in spite of the objections of his parents and relatives. He did not take the name Michael until his marriage in 1848.

He describes the day as:

Long sunk in superstition's night,
By Sin and Satan driven,
I saw not, cared not for the light
That leads the blind to Heaven.
But now, at length thy grace, O Lord!
Birds all around me shine;
I drink thy sweet, thy precious word,
I kneel before thy shrine!

He had to leave Hindu College on account of converting to Christianity. In 1844, he resumed his education at Bishop's College, where he stayed for three years.

In 1847, he moved to Madras (Chennai) due to family tensions and economic hardship, having been disinherited by his father. While in Madras, he stayed in the Black Town neighbourhood, and began working as an "usher" at the Madras Male Orphan Asylum. Four years later, in 1851, he became a Second Tutor in the Madras University High School. He edited and assisted in editing the periodicals Madras Circulator and General Chronicle, Athenaeum, Spectator and Hindoo Chronicle.

== Literary life ==
=== Early works (1849–1855) ===
Dutt wrote exclusively in English in his early writing years. The Captive Ladie was published in 1849 and, like Derozio's The Fakeer of Jungheera, takes on the form of a long narrative poem. In The Anglo-Saxon and the Hindu (1854), an essay in florid, even purple prose, are references to and quotations from almost the whole of Macaulay's shelf of European books. He was greatly influenced by the works of William Wordsworth and John Milton. Dutt was a spirited bohemian and Romantic.

=== Calcutta years (1858–1862) ===
The period during which he worked as a head clerk and later as the Chief Interpreter in the court marked his transition to writing in his native Bengali, following the advice of Bethune and Bysack. He wrote 5 plays: Sermista (1859), Padmavati (1859), Ekei Ki Boley Sabyata (1860), Krishna Kumari (1860) and Buro Shaliker Ghare Ron (1860). Then followed the narrative poems: Tilottama Sambhava Kavya (1861), Meghnad Badh Kavya (1861), Brajagana Kavya (1861) and Veerangana Kavya (1861). He also translated three plays from Bangla to English, including his own Sermista.

=== Final years (1866–1873) ===
A volume of his Bangla sonnets was published in 1866. His final play, Maya Kannan, was written in 1872. The Slaying of Hector, his prose version of the Iliad, remains incomplete.

=== Linguistic abilities ===
Madhusudan was a gifted linguist and polyglot. He studied English, Bengali, Hebrew, Latin, Greek, Tamil, Telugu and Sanskrit.

=== Work with the sonnet ===
He pioneered the Bengali sonnet and introduced European-style blank verse into Bengali poetry, revolutionizing its metrical structure.

Michael Madhusudan Dutt dedicated his first sonnet to his friend Rajnarayan Basu, which he accompanied with a letter: "What say you to this, my good friend? In my humble opinion, if cultivated by men of genius, our sonnet in time would rival the Italian." His most famous sonnet is Kapatakkha River.

Always, o river, you peep in my mind.
Always I think you in this loneliness.
Always I soothe my ears with the murmur
Of your waters in illusion, the way
Men hear songs of illusion in a dream.
Many a river I have seen on earth;
But which can quench my thirst the way you do?
You're the flow of milk in my homeland's breasts.
Will I meet you ever? As long as you
Go to kinglike ocean to pay the tax
Of water, I beg to you, sing my name
Into the ears of people of Bengal,
Sing his name, o dear, who in this far land
Sings your name in all his songs for Bengal.

When Dutt later stayed in Versailles, the sixth centenary of the Italian poet Dante Alighieri was being celebrated all over Europe. He composed a poem in honour of the poet, translated it into French and Italian, and sent it to the king of Italy. Victor Emmanuel II, then monarch, liked the poem and wrote to Dutt, saying, "It will be a ring which will connect the Orient with the Occident."

=== Work in blank verse ===
Sharmistha (spelt as Sermista in English) was Dutt's first attempt at blank verse in Bengali literature. Kaliprasanna Singha organised a felicitation ceremony for Madhusudan to mark the introduction of blank verse in Bengali poetry. His famous epic, quoted as the only epic of Bengali kind, Meghnadbad-Kabya is also totally written in blank verse.

Praising Dutt's blank verse, Sir Ashutosh Mukherjee, observed: "As long as the Bengali race and Bengali literature would exist, the sweet lyre of Madhusudan would never cease playing." He added: "Ordinarily, reading of poetry causes a soporific effect, but the intoxicating vigour of Madhusudan's poems makes even a sick man sit up on his bed."

In his The Autobiography of an Unknown Indian, Nirad C. Chaudhuri has remarked that during his childhood days in Kishoreganj, a common standard for testing guests' erudition in the Bengali language during family gatherings was to require them to recite the poetry of Dutt, without an accent.

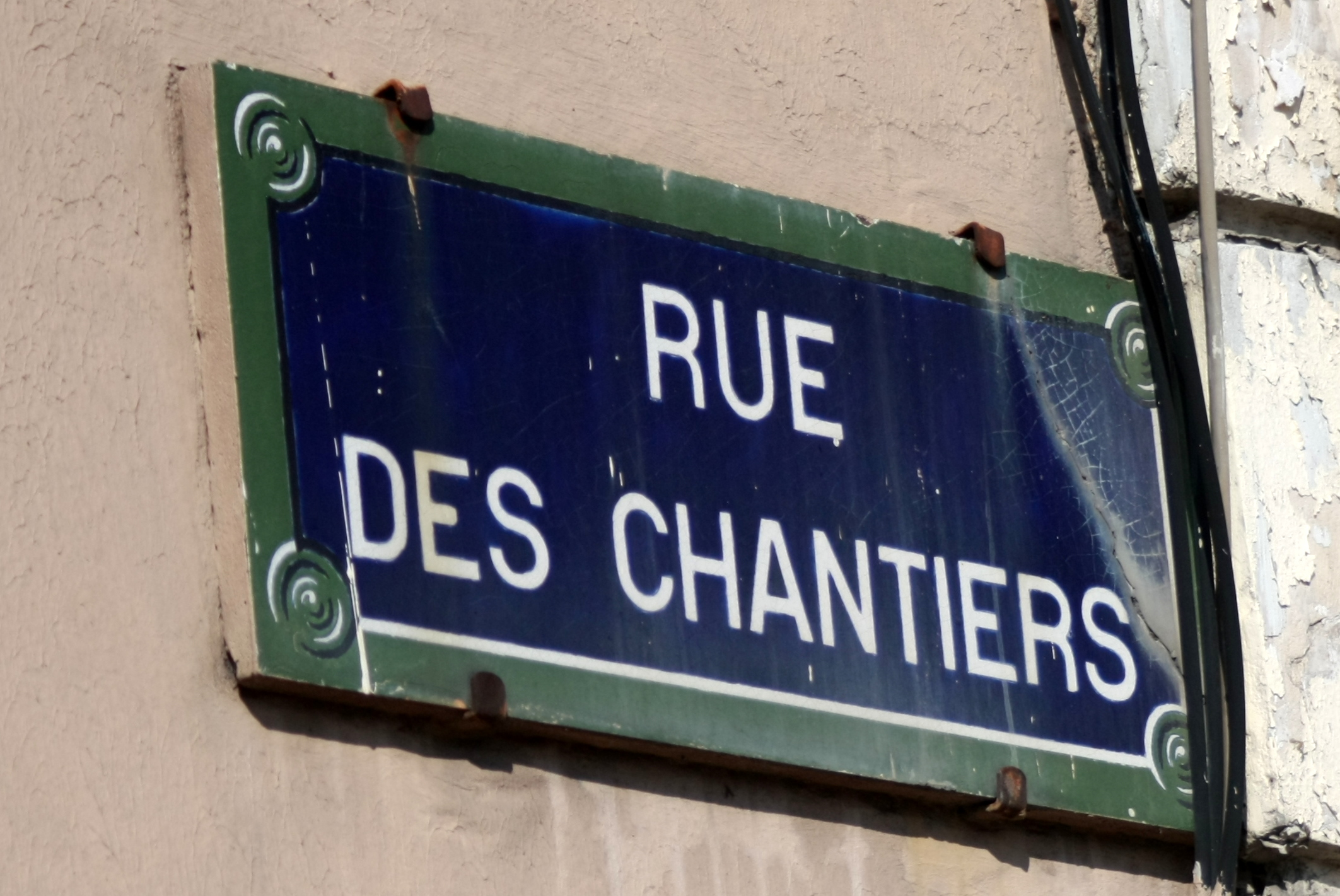
The street where Dutt used to live in Versailles, France.

Purabi Panwar's review "Lured by Hope : A Biography of Michael Madhusudan Dutt by Ghulam Murshid and Gopa Majumdar"centres on how Ghulam Murshid's biography rescues Michael Madhusudan Dutt from myth and misconception presenting a fact based portrait of the poet's rebellious life and his pioneering role in Bengali Literature. Panwar highlights that translator Gopa Majumdar was drawn to the book because it separated hearsay from the truth, drama from reality", a phrase that captures the review's central claim: that Murshid's work finally gives Dutt an unbiased, well-researched account after decades of legends overshadowing his actual literary achievements.

== Barrister-at-law ==
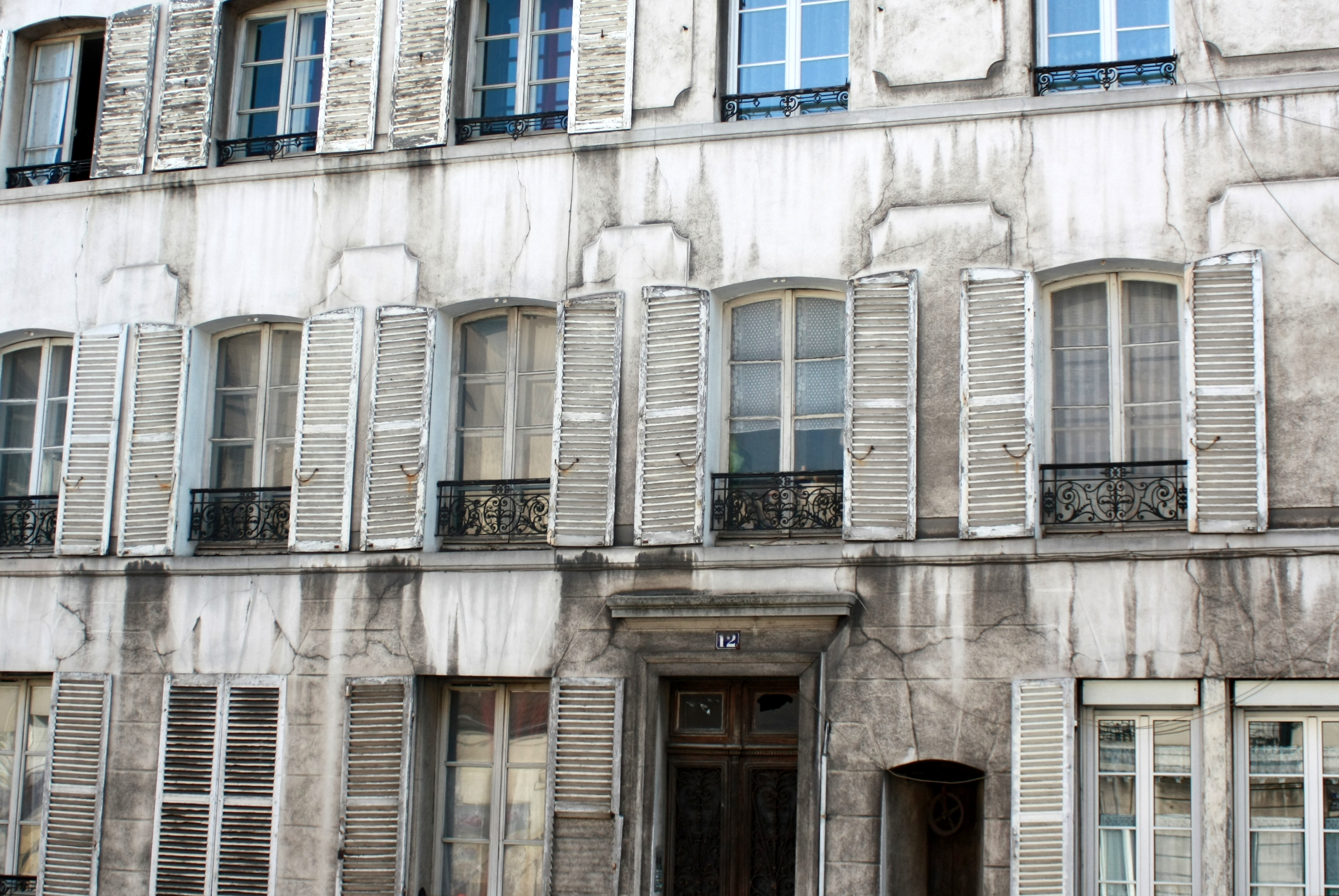
12 Rue Des Chantiers, 78000 Versailles, France – the apartment building where Dutt dwelled (photo taken in July 2011)

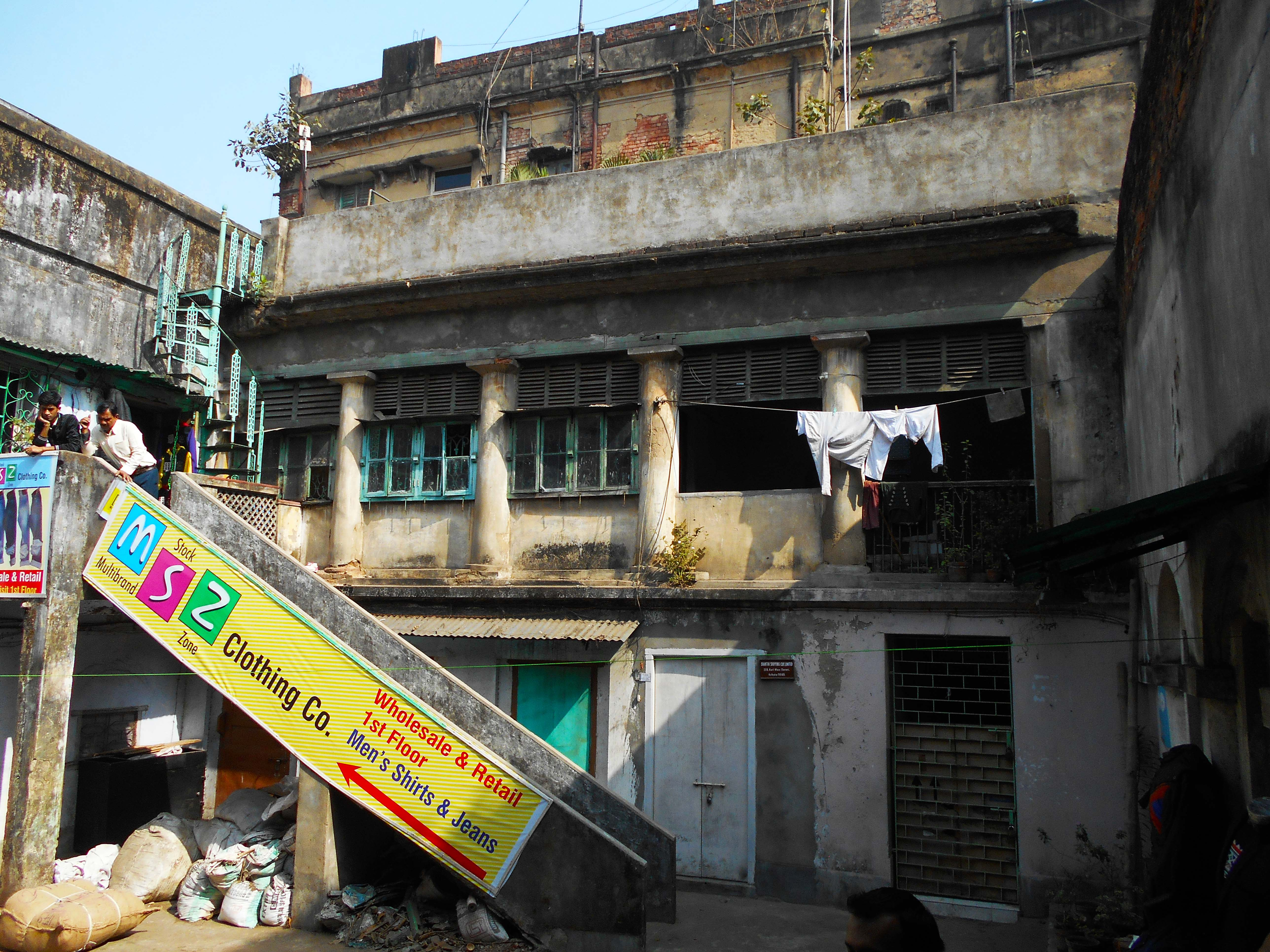
Dutt's residence in Khidirpur, Kolkata, India

Dutt went to England in 1862 to become a barrister-at-law and enrolled at the Gray's Inn.

On the eve of his departure to England:

রেখ, মা, দাসেরে মনে, এ মিনতি করি পদে
সাধিতে মনের সাধ
ঘটে যদি পরমাদ,
মধুহীন কর না গো মনঃ কোকনদে |
(Original Bengali)

Forget me not, O Mother,
Should I fail to return
To thy hallowed bosom.
Make not the lotus of thy memory
Void of its nectar honey.
(English translation by the poet.)

His family joined him in 1863, and thereafter they shifted to the much cheaper Versailles, due to the miserable state of their finances. Funds were not arriving from India according to his plans. He was only able to relocate to England in 1865 and study for the bar due to the generosity of Ishwar Chandra Vidyasagar. For this, Dutt was to regard Vidyasagar as Dayar Sagar (meaning the ocean of kindness) for as long as he lived. He was admitted to the High Court in Calcutta on his return in February 1867. His family followed him in 1869.

His stay in England had left him disillusioned with European culture. He wrote to his friend Bysack from France:

If there be any one among us anxious to leave a name behind him, and not pass away into oblivion like a brute, let him devote himself to his mother-tongue. That is his legitimate sphere his proper element.

== Marriage and family ==
Dutt had refused to enter into an arranged marriage which his father had decided for him. He had no respect for that tradition and wanted to break free from the confines of caste-based endogamous marriage. His knowledge of the European tradition convinced him of his choice of marriages made by mutual consent (or love marriages).

While in Madras, he married Rebecca Thompson McTavish, a 17-year-old of Scottish-Indian parentage, a resident of the Madras Female Orphan Asylum, on 31 July 1848. Dutt assumed the name Michael when the marriage was registered in the baptismal register. They had four children together. He wrote to Bysack in December 1855:

Yes, dearest Gour, I have a fine English Wife and four children.

Dutt returned from Madras to Calcutta in February 1856, after his father's death (in 1855), abandoning his wife and four children in Madras. No records of his divorce from Rebecca or remarriage have been found. In 1858, he was joined there by a 22-year old woman of French Eurasian extraction, Emelia Henrietta Sophie White, the daughter of his colleague at the Madras Male Orphan Asylum. They had two sons, Frederick Michael Milton (23 July 1861 – 11 June 1875) and Albert Napoleon (1869 – 22 August 1909), and a daughter, Henrietta Elizabeth Sermista (1859 – 15 February 1879). A fourth child was stillborn. Their relationship lasted until the end of her life, Henrietta pre-deceasing him by three days, on 26 June 1873.

Rebecca died in Madras in July 1892. Only a daughter (Phoebe Rebecca Salfelt Dutt) and a son (George John McTavish-Dutt) survived her. The son, McTavish-Dutt, practised as a pleader in the Court of Small Causes in Madras.

On the maternal side, the tennis player Leander Paes is a direct descendant (great-great-grandson) of Dutt.

== Death ==
Dutt died in Presidency General Hospital on 29 June 1873. Three days before his death, he recited a passage from Shakespeare's Macbeth to his dear friend Bysack, to express his deepest conviction of life:

...out, out, brief candle!
Life's but a walking shadow; a poor player,
That struts and frets his hour upon the stage,
And then is heard no more; it is a tale Told by an idiot,
full of sound and fury, Signifying nothing.

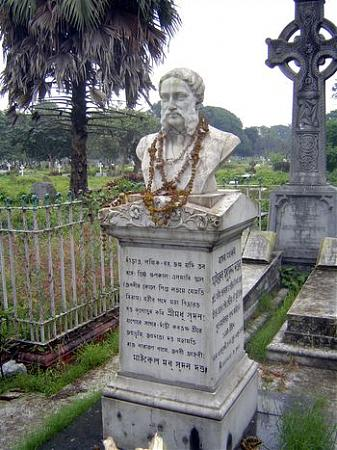
Tomb of Michael Madhusudan Dutt at the Lower Circular Road cemetery.

দাঁড়াও পথিক-বর, জন্ম যদি তব
বঙ্গে! তিষ্ঠ ক্ষণকাল! এ সমাধিস্থলে
(জননীর কোলে শিশু লভয়ে যেমতি
বিরাম) মহীর পদে মহা নিদ্রাবৃত
দত্তোকুলোদ্ভব কবি শ্রীমধুসূদন!
যশোরের সাগরদাঁড়ি কপোতাক্ষ-তীরে
জন্মভূমি, জন্মদাতা দত্ত মহামতি
রাজনারায়ণ নামে, জননী জাহ্নবী

Recitation of Madhusudan Dutt's Samadhi in Bengali
A 33-second sample recitation of poetry Samadhi

== Legacy and honours ==
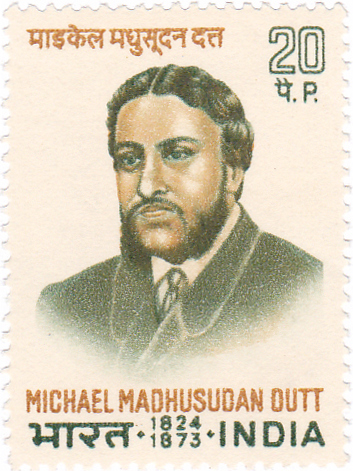
Michael Madhusudan Dutt 1973 stamp of India

Dutt was largely ignored for 15 years after his death. The belated tribute was a tomb erected at his gravesite.

His epitaph, a verse of his own, reads:

Stop a while, traveller!
Should Mother Bengal claim thee for her son.
As a child takes repose on his mother's elysian lap,
Even so here in the Long Home,
On the bosom of the earth,
Enjoys the sweet eternal sleep
Poet Madhusudan of the Duttas.

Michael Madhusudhan is a 1950 Indian Bengali-language drama film by Modhu Bose which starred Utpal Dutt in the titular role.

Author Namita Gokhale published a play about Madhusudhan in 2021, based largely on letters written by him to friends and other authors, called Betrayed by Hope.

In honour of Dutt, every year on his birthday, a fair is held in his home at Sagardari, which is organized by the District Council of Jessore. Every year, various MPs and ministers of the national parliament of Bangladesh attend this fair.

In honour of Dutt a school and a college are named after him in Jessore District. And a university was proposed to be set up in this birthplace. They are:

- Michael Madhusudan College
- Sagardari Michael Madhusadan Institution
- Micheal Madhusudan Specialized University
- A 12 km Long Road which connects Keshabpur with Sagardari Named after him, The road Known as Modhu Sarak.
- His Ancestors House known as Modhu Polli is also named after him.

=== In India ===
- Michael Madhusudan Dutta College in Tripura is named after him.
- Michael Madhusudan Memorial College in West Bengal is named after him.
- Madhusudan Mancha in West Bengal is named after him.

== Bibliography ==
=== Poems ===
==== Narrative poems ====
- King Porus: A Legend of Old (1843)
- The Captive Ladie (1849)
- Visions of the Past (1849)
- Tilōttamāsambhav Kāvya ("Birth of Tilottama"; 1860) — তিলোত্তমাসম্ভব কাব্য

==== Epic poems ====
- Mēghanādbadh Kāvya ("The Slaying of Meghnada"; 1861) — মেঘনাদবধ কাব্য
- Hēkṭar Badh ("The Slaying of Hector"; 1871) — হেক্‌টর বধ
- The Upsori: A Story from Hindu Mythology (1942)

==== Lyric poems ====
- Brajāṅganā Kāvya ("Woman of Braja"; 1861) — ব্রজাঙ্গনা কাব্য

==== Epistolary poems ====
- Vīrāṅganā Kāvya ("War Heroine"; 1861) — বীরাঙ্গনা কাব্য

==== Sonnets ====
- Caturddaśpadī Kavitāvalī ("Sonnets"; 1866) — চতুর্দ্দশপদী কবিতাবলী

==== Others ====
- Duḥkhēr Hētu ("The Cause of Suffering"; 1908) — দুঃখের হেতু
- Vividha Kāvya ("Miscellaneous Poetry"; 1940) — বিবিধ কাব্য
- Collected Poems (1942)

=== Plays ===
==== Verse dramas ====
- Rizia: Empress of Inde (1849)

==== Historical dramas ====
- Nil Darpan, or The Indigo Planting Mirror (1861) — নীলদর্পণ
- Māyā-Kānan ("The Enchanted Grove"; 1878) — মায়া-কানন

==== Mythological dramas ====
- Śarmmiṣṭhā Nāṭak/Sermisṭá (1859) — শর্ম্মিষ্ঠা নাটক

==== Farces/Comedies ====
- Ratnāvalī ("Jewel Necklace"; 1858)
- Ēkēi Ki Balē Sabhyatā? ("Is This Called Civilization?"; 1862) — একেই কি বলে সভ্যতা?
- Buṛōsālikēr Ghāṛē Rōm̐ ("The Old Mynah’s Neck Feathers"; 1883) — বুড়সালিকের ঘাড়ে রোঁ

==== Tragedies ====
- Kṛṣṇakumārī Nāṭak ("The Tragedy of Krishnakumari"; 1875) — কৃষ্ণকুমারী নাটক

=== Essays ===
- The Anglo-Saxon and the Hindu (1854)
- On Poetry, Etc.
- An Essay
- A Synopsis of the Rukmiṇīharaṇ Nāṭak

== See also ==
- Indian poetry in English
- Indian English literature
- Indian literature
