= Devudu Narasimha Sastri =

Indian writer

Devudu Narasimha Sastry
- Born: 7 December 1895
- Died: 27 October 1962 (aged 66)
- Occupations: Journalist, novelist, screenwriter

Devudu Narasimha Sastry (29 December 1886 – 27 October 1962), known popularly by his pen-name Devudu, was a Kannada writer and novelist, Sanskrit scholar, actor and journalist. His guru was Mahamahopadhyaya Vaidhyanatha Shastri.

Mimansa Darpana, his commentary on the Indian philosophy of Mimāṃsā, is ranked highly among works on the subject. Antaranga, his novel published in 1932, was the first novel in Kannada to employ the method of monologue narrative. In 1947, he published his most notable novel, Maha Brahmana (The Great Brahmin), based on the life of the sage Vishwamitra. Mahābramana (The Great Warrior), published in 1960, depicts the life and deeds of King Nahusha. This novel was awarded the Sahitya Akademi Award, the most prestigious literary merit awarded by the Government of India. Devudu's last novel, Maha Darshana (The Great Vision), is based on the life of sage Yajnavalkya; it was published after his death in 1962.

== Childhood and education ==
Devudu was born on 7 December in a Vedic tradition. His mother was Subbamma; father was Krishnasthani. His father died when he was two years old.

Devudu, who learned Sanskrit Amarakosha, Sabda and Raghuvamsha as a child at the age of five, had his primary, secondary and college education in Mysore.

He was a student of the Maharaja College of Mysore and the University of Mysore. In MA he chose Sanskrit and philosophy as the subject of study.

== Family life ==
In 1912, when Devudu was 16, he married his wife, Gauramma. They had three sons and six daughters. The first son died prematurely at an early age.

== Career ==
During 1923 and 1924, Devudu became headmaster at Sadvidyā Pāṭhaśāle, Mysore. Sometime in Sringeri's Sankaracharya monastery he functioned as a Peshkar.

He went to Bangalore from 1924 to 1929 and became headmaster of the Arya Vidyalaya. He left the institution for several years and founded the Gandhinagar High School for five years.

== Journalism ==
He entered journalism in 1927 as the editor of Navajivana, and in 1936 and 1938 was editor of the theater magazine. From 1936 to 1957, he ran Namma Pustaka, a free children's magazine. He also edited the Kannada Sahitya Parishad newspaper in 1935 and 1936.

== Hobbies and amateur work ==
Devudu's two other hobbies were drama and literature.

In 1921, he acted in several plays as an actor in Chamundeshwari Company. In 1926, he was a member of the Amateur Company.

He founded the Karnataka Film Corporation in 1928. In 1934, he wrote the script for the film Bhakta Dhruva. In 1936, he wrote the script for the film Chiranjeevi and played the role of sage Mṛkaṃḍu.

== Cultural and social work ==
Devudu founded the Kannada Sahitya society in 1937. From 1939 to 1942 he was involved in the Mysore Province's Adult Literacy Schemes.

He was a member of the Mysore Democratic Party from 1943 to 1945.

In 1946, he was a Director and Textbook Committee of Bangalore City Cooperative Bank.

In 1948, he was elected a member of the Bangalore City Corporation. He was also involved in the Karnataka unification struggle.

In 1950, he founded the Gīrvāṇavidyāpīṭha in Sankarapuram. He was a member of the Working Committee of the Kannada Sahitya Parishad from 1956 to 1959.

== Literature ==
Devudu is a major writer in Kannada. He wrote in many genres of literature. His greatness is the imagination, etymology, and realism found in his literature.

His first work was a spy novel, Sāhasavarma, written in 1912 when he was age 16.

In 1920, he wrote a comprehensive definition for "pūrvamegha".

At the suggestion of Devudu, Kengal Hanumanthayan opened the Kannada Culture Development Department and asked him to become director. But Devudu disagreed and suggested Sri CK Venkataramaiah.

== Personality ==
Devudu read the Ramayana, Mahabharata, Bhagavata, and Brahmandapurana when he was in primary school. "When Krishna played the flute, all the trees and the trees sprouted, yet why did the flute not sprout?" – When the women were discussing this question of a pastor, it was the young boy who gave the consolation, "It was afraid of Krishna throwing it away." At the same time, he participated in all kinds of games and paid attention to bodybuilding.

For over four years of his life, Devudu wrote hundreds of articles and speeches to promote culture, the message of the Bhagavad Gita.

The news of the death of his eldest son, Ramu, came to light when he was lecturing about the song in Udupi. Without a pause, he finished his speech. When he left the stage shortly after, friends became aware of his stoic and detached character, as prescribed in the Bahagavad Gita.

== Awards ==
- Special Award by the Maharaja of Mysore for the book Mīmāṃsā Darpaṇa in 1938
- Honored by Dr. Rajendra Prasad, the first President of India in 1952
- President of the Kannada Novelists Conference in 1952
- In 1963, the novel Mahākṣatriya was posthumously awarded the Central Sahitya Akademi Award

== End ==
Despite his cultural affluence, he lived in poverty. One of his disciples, who thought he was walking barefoot, bought a pair of slippers that injured his leg. In 1959, a collar had to be removed because of diabetes. This led to the end of his public life.

== Death ==
Devudu died on 27 October 1962.

== Notable writings ==
=== Commentary ===
- Mimansa Darpana (1930) (commentary)

=== Novel ===
- Mayura (historical)
- Bhāratada Mahāpuruṣaru
- Antaranga (1932)
- Maha Brahmana (1947) audio book
- Mahākṣatriya (1960) (novel based on Nahusha)
- Maha Darshana
- Karanataka Samskruti (cultural treatise)
- Solo-geluvo
- Avala Janma
- Dr Veena
- Mahabharatha
- Chinna – Vijayanagara Raja Nartaki
- Ramayanada Mahapurusharu
- Geddavaru Yaaru?
- Malli
- MahaDarshana
- Odeda Mutthu
- Sampoorana Valmiki Ramayana

1. ಎರಡನೇ ಜನ್ಮ 2. ಘಾಟಿ ಮುದುಕ ಮತ್ತು ಇತರ ಕಥೆಗಳು 3. ಸಾವಿತ್ರಿ 4. ವಿಚಿತ್ರ ಶಿಕ್ಷೆ 5. ದುರ್ಮಂತ್ರಿ 6. ಮೂಲ ಸಂಸ್ಕೃತ 7. ಮೈಸೂರು translation series (bhagha 1, 2,3) 8. ~ಭೇರಂಡೀಶ್ವರ~ 9. ಸುರಭಿ 10. ವಿಕ್ರಮೊರ್ವಶೀಯ 11. ಅಮೇರಿಕಾದ ಕಥೆ 12. ಮಹಾಭಾರತ ಸಂಗ್ರಹ ಭಾಗ 1 and 2 13. ಕನ್ನಡದ ಭಾಗವತ 14. ವೇದಾಂತ 15. ಕಂದನ ಕಥೆಗಳು 16. ಗಣೇಶನ ಕಥೆ 17. ತಂತ್ರಗಾರಿ ನರಿ ಮತ್ತು ಇತರ ಕಥೆಗಳು 18. ಪಂಚಾಮೃತ ಮತ್ತು ಇತರ ಕಥೆಗಳು 19. ಬಂಜೆಯ ಮಗ ಮತ್ತು ಇತರ ಕಥೆಗಳು 20. ಒಂದು ಕನಸು ಮತ್ತು ಇತರ ಕಥೆಗಳು 21. ಅವಸರ ಮತ್ತು ಇತರ ಕಥೆಗಳು 22. ಬರಿಯ ಆಸೆ ಮತ್ತು ಇತರ ಕಥೆಗಳು 23. ಸ್ನೇಹಿತರು ಮತ್ತು ಇತರ ಕಥೆಗಳು 24. ಅಲ್ಲಿ ಇಲ್ಲಿ ಕಥೆ ಗಳು (ಭೀಮಸೇನ ಬೆಕ್ಕು) 25. ಅಲ್ಲಿ ಇಲ್ಲಿ ಕಥೆ ಗಳು (ಅರಸಿನ ಮಗಳು) 26. ಯವನ ಪುರಾಣ 27. ದೇವುಡು ಅವರ 4 ಮಕ್ಕಳ ಕಥೆಗಳು 28. ಸಾಹಸವರ್ಮ 29. ಕರ್ನಾಟಕ ಶಿಕ್ಷಾ 30. ಚಿತ್ರ ವ್ಯಾಕರಣ

=== Other ===
- Yoga Vasista (seven volumes)

=== Short stories ===
- Devudu Avara Sannakathegalu
- Buddhiya Kathegalu
