= 2012 Delhi gang rape and murder =

Gang rape, torture, murder and assault incident in India

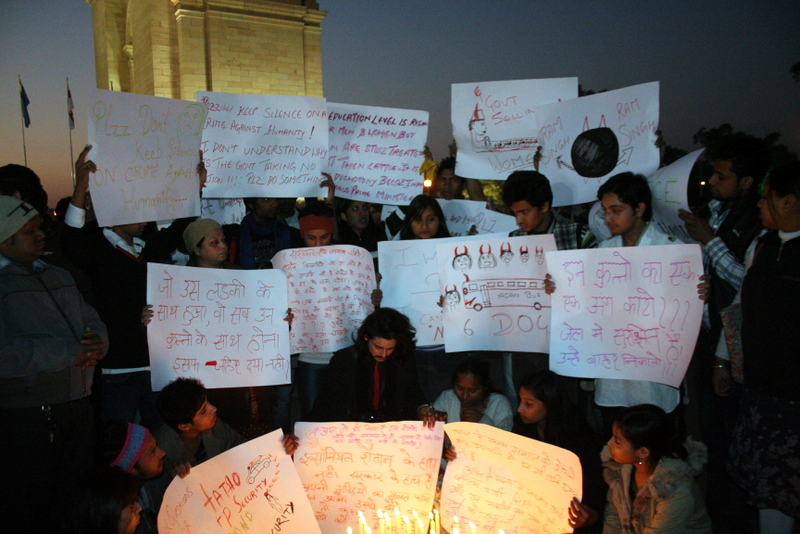
- Protesters at India Gate in Delhi
- Location: Delhi, India
- Date: 16 December 2012
- Attack type: Femicide, torture murder, gang rape, kidnapping, robbery, assault
- Deaths: 1
- Injuries: 2
- Victims: Jyoti Singh, Avnindra Pratap Pandey
- Perpetrators: Akshay Thakur; Mukesh Singh; Mohammed Afroz (then aged 17); Pawan Gupta; Ram Singh (died by suicide from hanging in jail before trial); Vinay Sharma
- Verdict: Guilty on all counts
- Convictions: Rape, murder, unnatural offences, destruction of evidence
- Sentence: Death penalty for the four adult convicts (sentences carried out in 2020); Afroz sentenced to three years in prison under Juvenile Justice laws when the crime was committed

The 2012 Delhi gang rape and murder, commonly known as the Nirbhaya case, involved the gang rape and murder of a 22-year-old woman, Jyoti Singh, in a moving bus on 16 December 2012 in Munirka, a neighbourhood in Delhi, India. The assault took place when Jyoti, a physical therapy intern, was beaten, gang raped, and tortured in a private bus in which she was travelling with her friend, Avnindra Pratap Pandey. There were six other men in the bus, including the driver, all of whom raped the woman and beat her friend. She was rushed to Safdarjung Hospital in Delhi for treatment and, as the public outrage mounted, the government had her transferred to Mount Elizabeth Hospital in Singapore eleven days after the assault, where she died from her injuries two days later. The incident generated widespread national and international coverage and was widely condemned, both in India and abroad. Subsequently, public protests against the Government of Delhi and the Government of India for failing to provide adequate security for women took place in New Delhi, where thousands of protesters clashed with security forces. Similar protests took place in major cities throughout the country. Since Indian law does not allow the press to publish a rape victim's name, the victim was widely known as Nirbhaya, meaning "fearless", and her struggle and death became a symbol of women's resistance to rape around the world.

All the accused were arrested and charged with sexual assault and murder. One of the accused, Ram Singh, died in police custody from possible suicide on 11 March 2013. According to some published reports and the police, Ram Singh hanged himself, but the defence lawyers and his family allege he was murdered. The rest of the accused went on trial in a fast-track court; the prosecution finished presenting its evidence on 8 July 2013. On 10 September 2013, the four adult defendants – Pawan Gupta, Vinay Sharma, Akshay Thakur and Mukesh Singh (Ram Singh's brother) – were found guilty of rape and murder and three days later were sentenced to death. In the death reference case and hearing appeals on 13 March 2014, Delhi High Court upheld the guilty verdict and the death sentences. On 18 December 2019, the Supreme Court of India rejected the final appeals of the condemned perpetrators of the attack. The four adult convicts were executed by hanging on 20 March 2020. The juvenile was convicted of rape and murder under the Juvenile Justice (Care and Protection of Children) Act, 2000 and given the maximum sentence of three years' imprisonment in a reform facility.

As a result of the protests, in December 2012, a judicial committee was set up to study and take public suggestions for the best ways to amend laws to provide quicker investigation and prosecution of sex offenders. After considering about 80,000 suggestions, the committee submitted a report which indicated that failures on the part of the government and police were the root cause behind crimes against women. In 2013, the Criminal Law (Amendment) Act, 2013 was promulgated by President Pranab Mukherjee, several new laws were passed, and six new fast-track courts were created to hear rape cases. Critics argue that the legal system remains slow to hear and prosecute rape cases, but most agree that the case has resulted in a tremendous increase in the public discussion of crimes against women and statistics show that there has been an increase in the number of women willing to file a crime report. However, in December 2014, two years after the attack, the victim's father called the promises of reform unmet and said that he felt regret in that he had not been able to bring justice for his daughter and other women like her.

== Incident ==
The victims, a 22-year-old woman, Jyoti Singh and her male friend were returning home on the night of 16 December 2012 after watching the film Life of Pi at PVR Nexus Select Citywalk, Saket. They took an auto rickshaw to Munirka bus stand, then boarded the bus at Munirka for Dwarka at about 9:30 pm (IST). There were only six others in the bus, including the driver. One of the men, identified as a minor, had called for passengers telling them that the bus was going towards their destination. They took ₹10 each as fare from both the victims. The victim's male friend became suspicious when the bus deviated from its normal route and its doors were shut. When he objected, the group of six men already on board, including the driver, taunted the couple, asking what they were doing alone at such a late hour.

During the argument, a scuffle ensued between her friend and the group of men. He was beaten, gagged and knocked unconscious with an iron rod. The men then dragged Singh to the rear of the bus, beating her with the rod and raping her while the bus driver continued to drive. A medical report later said that she suffered serious injuries to her abdomen, intestines and genitals due to the assault, and doctors said that the damage indicated that a blunt object (suspected to be the iron rod) may have been used for penetration. That rod was later described by police as being a rusted, L-shaped implement of the type used as a wheel jack handle.

According to police reports, Jyoti attempted to fight off her assailants, biting three of the attackers and leaving bite marks on the accused men. After the beatings and rape ended, the attackers threw both victims from the moving bus. One of the perpetrators later cleaned the vehicle to remove evidence. Police impounded it the next day.

The partially clothed victims were found on the road by a passerby at around 11 pm. The passerby called the Delhi Police who took the couple to Safdarjung Hospital, where Jyoti was given emergency treatment and placed on mechanical ventilation. She was found with injury marks, including numerous bite marks, all over her body. According to reports, one of the accused men admitted to having seen a rope-like object, assumed to be her intestines, being pulled out of the woman by the other assailants on the bus. Two blood-stained metal rods were retrieved from the bus and medical staff confirmed that "it was penetration by this that caused massive damage to her genitals, uterus and intestines".

== Victims ==
Jyoti Singh was born in Delhi on 10 May 1990, the eldest of three children and the only daughter of a lower middle class family. Her parents hailed from a small village in Ballia district of Uttar Pradesh. While Jyoti's mother is a homemaker, her father worked double shifts (two jobs) to support his family and send his children to good schools. In an interview, he related that as a youth, he had dreamed of becoming a teacher, but his family could not afford to support his education beyond high school. After moving to Delhi, he worked at a pressure cooker factory, as a security guard and eventually a luggage loader. He said, "when I left [his village] 30 years ago, I vowed never deny my children so sending them to school was fulfilling my desire for knowledge." He said, "It never entered our hearts to ever discriminate. How could I be happy if my son is happy and my daughter isn't? And it was impossible to refuse a little girl who loved going to school."

Jyoti Singh graduated in physiotherapy from the Sai Institute of Paramedical & Allied Sciences in Dehradun, and had just applied for an intern's position at St. Stephen's Hospital, Delhi. She lived in Delhi and occasionally visited her family's ancestral village.

In compliance with Indian law, the real name of the victim was initially not released to the media, so pseudonyms were used for her by various media houses instead, including Jagruti (awareness), Amanat (treasure), Nirbhaya (fearless one), Damini (lightning, after the hit 1993 Hindi film) and Delhi braveheart.

The male victim, Avindra Pratap Pandey, was a software engineer from Gorakhpur, Uttar Pradesh, who lived in Ber Sarai, New Delhi; he suffered broken limbs but survived.

Delhi police registered a criminal case against the editor of a Delhi-based tabloid, Mail Today, for disclosing the female victim's identity, as such disclosure is an offence under section 228(A) of Indian Penal Code. Shashi Tharoor, then a union minister, suggested that if the parents had no objection, her identity could be made public, as a mark of respect for her courageous response, with the possibility of naming future laws after her. Speaking to a British reporter on 5 January, the victim's father was quoted as saying, "We want the world to know her real name. My daughter didn't do anything wrong, she died while protecting herself. I am proud of her. Revealing her name will give courage to other women who have survived these attacks. They will find strength from my daughter." Indian law forbids revealing the name of a rape victim unless the family agrees to it and, following the news article which published the father's reported quote and the victim's name, some news outlets in India, Germany, Australia, and the United States also revealed her name. However, the following day Zee News quoted the father as saying, "I have only said we won't have any objection if the government uses my daughter's name for a new law for crime against women that is more stringent and better framed than the existing one." During a protest against the juvenile convict's release on 16 December 2015, the victim's mother stated that her daughter's name was Jyoti Singh and she was not ashamed of disclosing her name.

== Medical treatment and death ==
On 19 December 2012, Singh underwent her fifth surgery, which removed most of her remaining intestine. Doctors reported that she was in "stable but critical" condition. On 21 December, the government appointed a committee of doctors to ensure she received the best medical care. By 25 December, she remained intubated, on life support and in critical condition. Doctors stated that she had a fever of 102 to 103 °F (39 °C) and that internal bleeding due to sepsis was somewhat controlled. It was reported that she was "stable, conscious and meaningfully communicative".

At a cabinet meeting chaired by then-Prime Minister of India Manmohan Singh on 26 December, a decision was made to fly her to Mount Elizabeth Hospital in Singapore for further treatment. Mount Elizabeth is a multi-organ transplant specialty hospital. Some doctors criticised the decision as political, questioning the need to transfer an intensive care unit (ICU) patient for organ transplants that were not scheduled for weeks or even months. Government sources indicated that then Chief Minister of Delhi, Sheila Dikshit, was personally behind the decision. Hours earlier, then-Union Minister P. Chidambaram had stated that Jyoti was not in a condition to be moved.

During the six-hour air-ambulance flight to Singapore on 27 December, Jyoti suddenly went into a "near collapse", which a later report described as cardiac arrest. The doctors on board inserted an arterial line to stabilise her, but she had been without a pulse and blood pressure for nearly three minutes and never regained consciousness in Singapore.

On 28 December, at 11 am (IST), Jyoti's condition was extremely critical. The chief executive officer of the Mount Elizabeth Hospital said that the victim suffered brain damage, pneumonia, and abdominal infection, and that she was "fighting for her life." Her condition continued to deteriorate, and she died at 4:45 am on 29 December, Singapore Standard Time (2:15 am, 29 December, IST; 8:45 pm, 28 December, UTC). Her body was cremated on 30 December in Delhi under high police security. The Bharatiya Janata Party, then the country’s main opposition party, criticised the high-security measures, stating that they were reminiscent of The Emergency Era, during which civil liberties were suspended. One of Jyoti's brothers later remarked that the decision to fly her out to Singapore had come too late, and they had held high hopes for her recovery prior to her death.

== Arrests ==
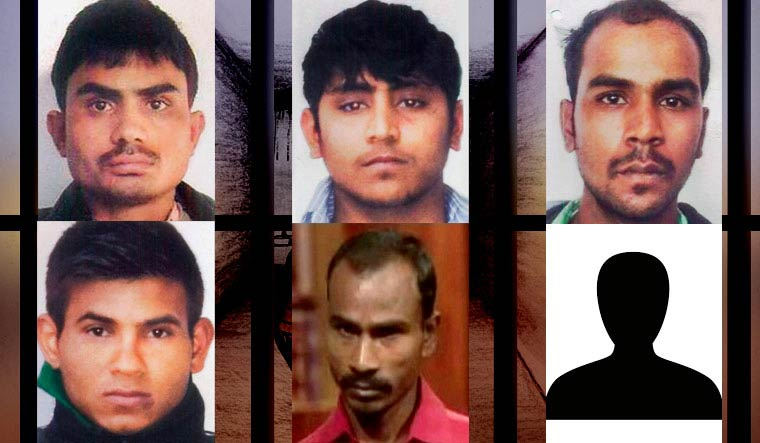
The six Nirbhaya case convicts (clockwise from top left): Akshay Thakur, Pawan Gupta, Mukesh Singh, Mohammed Afroz, whose identity was protected due to his status as a minor, Ram Singh (deceased) and Vinay Sharma.

A Special Investigation Team (SIT) was formed to investigate the case, which was led by Pramod Kumar Kushwaha, the Deputy Commissioner of Delhi Police's Special Cell. Police found and arrested some suspects within 24 hours of the crime. From recordings made by a highway CCTV, a description of the bus, a white charter bus with a name written on it, was broadcast. Other operators identified it as being contracted by a South Delhi private school. They then traced it and found its driver, Ram Singh. Police obtained sketches of the assailants with the help of the male victim, and used a mobile phone stolen from the two victims to find one of the assailants.

Six men were arrested in connection with the incident. They included 30-year-old Ram Singh, the bus driver, and his 26-year-old brother, Mukesh Singh, who were both arrested in Rajasthan. Ram and Mukesh Singh lived in Ravidas camp, a slum in South Delhi. 20-year-old Vinay Sharma, an assistant gym instructor, and 19-year-old Pawan Gupta, a fruit seller, were both arrested in UP and Bihar. A 17-year-old juvenile named Mohammed Afroz, from Budaun, Uttar Pradesh, was arrested at the Anand Vihar Terminal railway station in Delhi. The juvenile had only met the others that day. 28-year-old Akshay Thakur, who had come to Delhi seeking employment, was the final suspect to be arrested in Aurangabad, Bihar; he was married with one son at the time of his arrest.

According to reports, the group had been eating and drinking together and "having a party" earlier in the day. Although the charter bus which Ram Singh drove on weekdays was not permitted to pick up public passengers or even to operate in Delhi because of its tinted windows, they decided to take it out "to have some fun". A few hours before committing the gang rape, the attackers had robbed a carpenter. The carpenter was 35-year-old Ramadhir Singh (unrelated to Ram, Mukesh and Jyoti), who boarded the bus that was being driven by Mukesh Singh. The juvenile convict had lured him into the bus saying it was going to Nehru Place. He was then beaten up and robbed of his mobile phone and ₹1500 in cash. After robbing him, the group dumped him at the IIT Flyover. He reported the robbery to three police constables: Kailash, Ashok and Sandeep, who were passing nearby. They refused to take any action in response, saying that the crime scene wasn't under their purview as they were from the Hauz Khas police station, and that he would have to report the incident to the station in Vasant Vihar.

Shortly after the attacks, Pawan Gupta said he accepted his guilt and should be hanged. Mukesh Singh, who was placed in Tihar Jail after his arrest, was assaulted by other inmates and was kept in solitary confinement for his own protection.

Ram Singh was presented before the Metropolitan Magistrate on 18 December 2012. He refused to participate in an identification process. Investigation revealed a history of frequent drinking that resulted in "blinding rage", "bad temper", and quarrels with employers, that had led friends to call him "mental". On 11 March, Ram Singh was discovered hanging from a ventilator shaft in his cell which he shared with 3 other prisoners, at about 5:45 a.m. Authorities said it was unclear whether it was a suicide or a murder.

== Trial ==
The male victim, Avindra Pratap Pandey, testified in court on 19 December 2012. Pandey recorded his statement with a sub-divisional magistrate at the Safdarjung Hospital on 21 December, in the presence of the Deputy Commissioner of police. He was reportedly plagued with guilt and trauma over the incident.

On 21 December, the government promised to file the chargesheet quickly and seek the maximum penalty of life imprisonment for the perpetrators. Following public outrage and a demand for a speedy trial and prosecution, on 24 December, the police promised to file the charge sheet within one week. The Parliamentary Standing Committee on Home Affairs met on 27 December to discuss the issue, and Home Secretary R. K. Singh and Commissioner of the Delhi Police Neeraj Kumar were summoned to appear. The Delhi High Court approved the creation of five fast-track courts to try rape and sexual assault cases. The first of the five approved fast-track courts was inaugurated on 2 January 2013 by Altamas Kabir, Chief Justice of India, in Saket court complex in South Delhi.

On 21 December, the Delhi High Court reprimanded the Delhi police for being "evasive" in a probe status report providing details of officers on patrol duty in the area covered by the bus route. A further court hearing on the matter was scheduled for 9 January 2013. The following day, the Delhi Police initiated action against three Hauz Khas police station personnel for their inaction in responding to the robbery of the carpenter that took place on the bus earlier in the day. On 24 December, two Assistant commissioner of police were suspended for failing to prevent the gang rape incident.

=== Juvenile defendant ===
The juvenile defendant Mohammed Afroz, whose name was later changed to Raju in the media due to his age, was declared as 17 years and six months old on the day of the crime by the Juvenile Justice Board (JJB), which relied on his birth certificate and school documents. The JJB rejected a police request for a bone ossification (age determination) test for a positive documentation of his age.

On 28 January 2013, the Juvenile Justice Board determined that Afroz would not be tried as an adult. A petition launched by Janata Party president Subramanian Swamy seeking the prosecution of the minor as an adult due to the violent nature of his alleged crime was rejected by the JJB. The minor was tried separately in a juvenile court.

A verdict in the case was scheduled to be announced on 25 July, but was deferred until 5 August and then deferred again to 19 August. On 31 August, he was convicted of rape and murder under the Juvenile Justice (Care and Protection of Children) Act, 2000 and given the maximum sentence of three years' imprisonment in a reform facility, inclusive of the eight months he spent in remand during the trial. Reportedly, Jyoti's younger brother had impulsively tried to attack the juvenile convict after hearing the verdict but the crowd in the courtroom managed to restrain him. The juvenile was released on 20 December 2015.

For the rehabilitation and mainstreaming of Afroz as mandated by the Juvenile Justice (Care and Protection of Children) Act, 2000 management committees were set up before the release of juvenile convicts. Accordingly, a 'post-release plan' was submitted to the Delhi high court in December 2015. The plan was prepared and submitted by the management committee, headed by the officer of the District Child Protection Unit, and had recommended that "(Afroz) should lead a new life with a new identity provided by the appropriate government as applicable in his case if permissible to avoid any backlash or violent reaction". According to the report, the juvenile had learnt cooking and tailoring while staying in the reform house. The report further said that Afroz would need a tailoring shop, a sewing machine and other tailoring equipment. The report also mentioned that a one-time grant of ₹10,000 (US$100) from the government should be sufficient to support him initially. The Department of Women and Child Development and Social Welfare (WCD) of the government stated that it would provide the money and would arrange the machine from an NGO. Afroz's family had ostracized him for the crime and refused to accept him. However, after his release it was reported that he was working as a cook.

=== Adult defendants ===
Five days after Jyoti's death, on 3 January 2013, the police filed charges against the five adult men for rape, murder, kidnapping, destruction of evidence, and the attempted murder of the woman's male companion. Senior Lawyer Dayan Krishnan was appointed as the special public prosecutor. Mukesh Singh, Vinay Sharma, Akshay Thakur and Pawan Gupta denied the charges. Some of the men had confessed earlier; however, their lawyers said that their clients had been tortured and that their confessions had been coerced.

On 10 January, one of their lawyers, Manohar Lal Sharma, said in a media interview that the victims were responsible for the assault because they should not have been using public transportation and, as an unmarried couple, they should not have been on the streets at night. He went on to say: "Until today I have not seen a single incident or example of rape with a respected lady. Even an underworld don would not like to touch a girl without respect." He also called the male victim "wholly responsible" for the incident because he "failed in his duty to protect the woman".

The Delhi police filed a chargesheet against the defendants on 13 March in the robbery of Ramadhir.

The four surviving adult defendants went on trial in a fast-track court. The prosecution presented evidence including witness statements, the victim's statement, fingerprints, DNA testing, and dental modelling. It completed its case on 8 July.

=== Conviction, sentencing, and imprisonment ===
On 10 September 2013, in the fast track court of Delhi, the four adult defendants were found guilty of rape, murder, unnatural offences and destruction of evidence. The four men faced the death penalty, and demonstrators outside the courthouse called for the hanging of the defendants. The victim's father also called for the defendants to be hanged, stating, "We will get complete closure only if all the accused are wiped off from the face of the earth." Lawyers for three of the four stated that their clients intended to appeal the verdict. The four men were sentenced on 13 September to death by hanging. Judge Yogesh Khanna rejected pleas for a lesser sentence saying the case has "shocked the collective conscience of India" and that "courts cannot turn a blind eye to such crimes." The victim's family was present for the sentencing and her mother expressed satisfaction over the verdict saying, "We were waiting with bated breath, now we are relieved. I thank the people of my country and the media." After the verdict was delivered, the people waiting outside the courtroom applauded.

Upon hearing that he would be executed, Vinay Sharma collapsed and pleaded with the judge, saying, "Please sir, please sir." As the men left the courtroom, they shouted out to the crowd, "Brothers, save us!"

While on death row, Mukesh Singh blamed Jyoti for being raped, saying "You can't clap with one hand – it takes two hands. A decent girl won't roam around at 9 o'clock at night. A girl is far more responsible for rape than a boy. Boy and girl are not equal. Housework and housekeeping is for girls, not roaming in discos and bars at night doing wrong things, wearing wrong clothes. About 20 percent of girls are good." Singh also blamed Jyoti for her death, saying "When being raped, she shouldn't fight back. She should just be silent and allow the rape. Then they'd have dropped her off after 'doing her', and only hit the boy."

On 13 March 2014, the Delhi High Court found each of the defendants guilty of rape, murder, unnatural offences and destruction of evidence. With the verdict, the High Court confirmed the death sentences for the four men convicted in September 2013. The court noted that the crime, which stirred widespread protests over sexual crimes against women in the country, fell into the judicial system's "rarest of the rare category" that allows capital punishment. The lawyers of the four men said they would appeal to the Supreme Court.

== Supreme Court appeal ==
On 15 March 2014, the Supreme Court of India stayed the execution of two of the four convicts, Mukesh Singh and Pawan Gupta, to allow them to make their appeal against their conviction on 31 March. This was further extended by the court to the second week of July. On 2 June, the two other convicts, Sharma and Thakur, also asked the Supreme Court to stay their execution to allow them to make an appeal of their convictions. On 14 July, their execution was also stayed by Supreme Court. On 27 August 2015, Vinay, Akshay, Mukesh and Pawan were convicted of robbing Ramadhir and were later sentenced to 10 years' imprisonment.

On 5 May 2017, the Supreme Court rejected the convicts' appeal and, saying they had committed "a barbaric crime" that had "shaken society's conscience", the court upheld the death sentence of the four who had been charged in the murder. The verdict was well received by the family of the victim and the civil society. According to legal experts, the convicts still had the right to file a review petition to the Supreme Court. On 9 July 2018, the Supreme Court rejected a review petition by three of the convicts.

In November 2019, the Supreme Court dismissed a review petition from Akshay pleading for mercy. In doing so, the court retained the death sentence. After the verdict, Akshay's lawyer told the Supreme Court that he would appeal to the president. For this, he should be given three weeks' time. In January 2020, a five-judge bench of the Supreme Court of India rejected the curative petitions of convicts, Vinay Sharma and Mukesh.

On 7 January 2020 a death warrant was issued for the convicts by a Delhi court, setting an execution date of 22 January 2020 at 7:00 a.m. IST in Tihar Jail.

Government authorities and the victim's mother alleged that the four convicts were "intentionally delaying" and "frustrating" the legal process in this case by filing their pleas in stages, so that the execution could be postponed. Under prison rules, if any one particular case results in more than one death penalty conviction (as here) and any one of those convicted in the case petitions for a mercy plea, the execution dates of all others convicted in the case must be postponed until a decision is made on the pending mercy plea.

=== Mercy plea to the President of India ===
Mukesh Singh filed a mercy plea in January 2020. The Delhi government made a recommendation to reject the plea and forwarded it to the Lieutenant Governor. On 17 January 2020, the President of India rejected the mercy plea. Both the Government of Delhi and Ministry of Home Affairs had recommended the president that the plea should be rejected.

=== Second, third and fourth death warrants ===
On 17 January 2020, hours after the rejection of the mercy plea, Judge Dharmender Rana issued a second death warrant for the convicts to be hanged after a mandatory fourteen-day gap on 1 February at 6:00 a.m. The fourteen days' reprieve was provided in accordance with law which states that the convicts awaiting an execution must have a reprieve after their mercy plea is rejected. During the same hearing, the court also rejected a plea by the convict Mukesh to postpone the execution.

On 17 January, Pawan appealed to the Supreme Court against the Delhi High Court order that rejected his claim that Pawan was a juvenile during the crime in 2012. On 31 January, a Delhi court stayed the death warrant. The judge did not issue a fresh warrant for their execution. The lawyer cited Rule 836 of the prison manual which says that in a case where more than one person has been sentenced to death, the execution cannot take place unless all the convicts have exhausted their legal options.

On 17 February 2020, a third death warrant was issued by the court with the execution date as 3 March 2020 at 6:00 a.m. On 4 March 2020, a fourth death warrant was issued by court with the execution date as 20 March 2020 at 5:30 a.m. Numerous pleas and appeals were made by both the families of the convicts and the convicts themselves, including three of the convicts moving the International Court of Justice for a stay on the death sentence; however, the date for the execution remained the same.

== Executions ==
On 20 March 2020, at 5:30 a.m. IST, Mukesh Singh, Vinay Sharma, Akshay Thakur and Pawan Gupta were executed at Tihar Jail. The gallows used for the execution had been specially designed for four people. According to prison officials, the four convicts refused the offers of a last meal and new clothes prior to the execution. They were blindfolded and did not resist as they were led to the gallows; however, Vinay Sharma suffered a breakdown prior to his execution and began pleading with the guards. The four convicts were pronounced dead after hanging for 30 minutes. Mukesh Singh reportedly requested to donate his organs.

== Public protests ==
=== After the incident ===
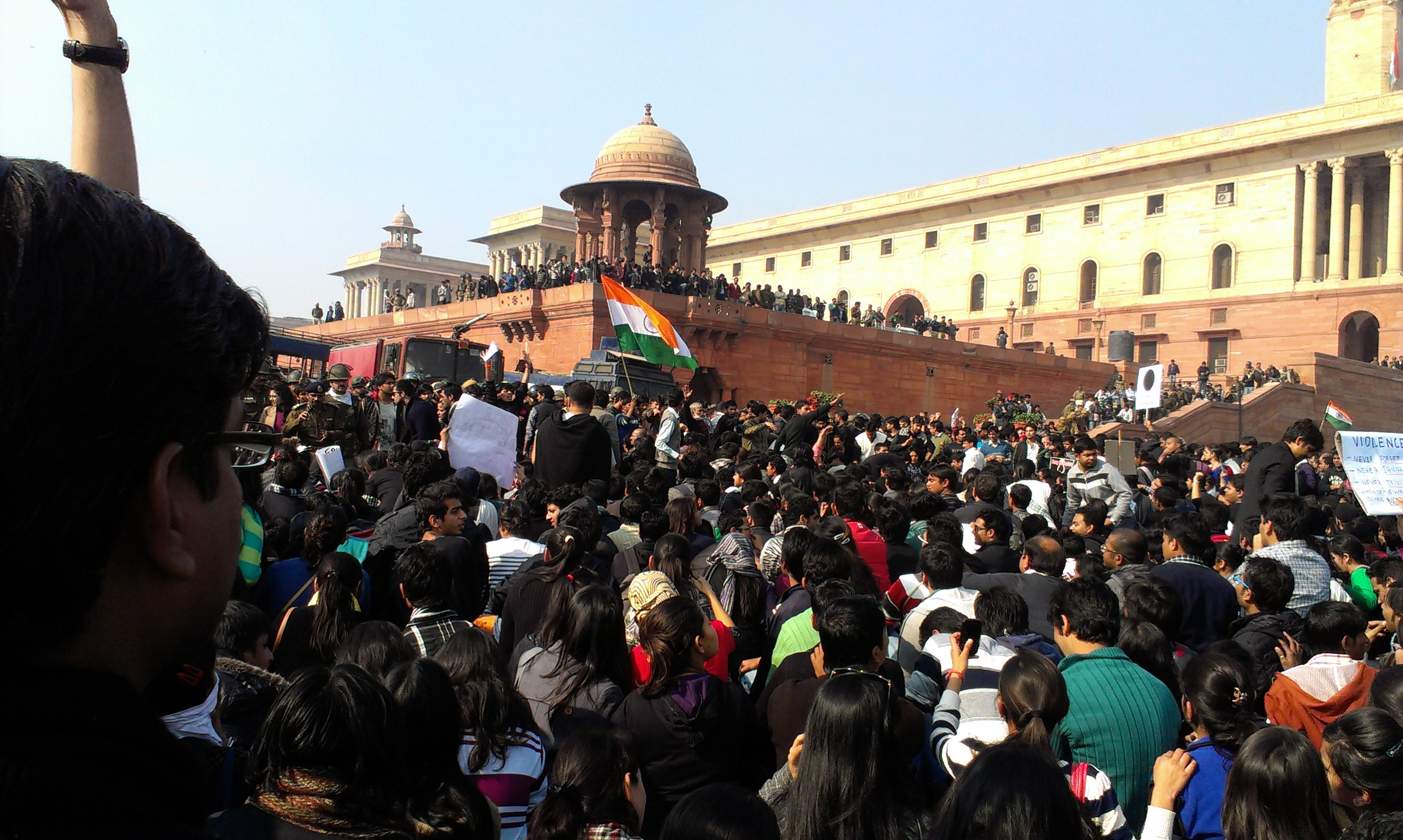
Students protest at Raisina Hill, Rajpath, New Delhi

Public protests took place in New Delhi on 21 December 2012 at India Gate and Raisina Hill, the latter being the location of both the Parliament of India and Rashtrapati Bhavan, the official residence of the President of India. Thousands of protesters clashed with police and battled Rapid Action Force units. Demonstrators were baton charged, shot with water cannon and tear gas shells, and arrested.

Similar protests occurred throughout the country. More than 600 women belonging to various organisations demonstrated in Bengaluru. Thousands of people silently marched in Kolkata. Protests occurred online as well on the social networking sites Facebook and WhatsApp, with users replacing their profile images with a black dot symbol. Tens of thousands signed an online petition protesting the incident.

Yoga guru Ramdev and former Chief of the Army Staff General V. K. Singh were among the demonstrators who clashed with Delhi Police at Jantar Mantar. On 24 December, activist Rajesh Gangwar started a hunger strike, saying about the accused men, "If my death shakes the system and gets them hanged, I am ready to die". Gangwar ended his fast after 14 days, saying, "My fight to demand a strict law against rape will be continued in the future... I have dedicated myself for this cause". Middle Finger Protests, a Chandigarh-based pressure group and NGO headed by human rights and social activist Prabhloch Singh, also played a key role in the agitations and protests in New Delhi.

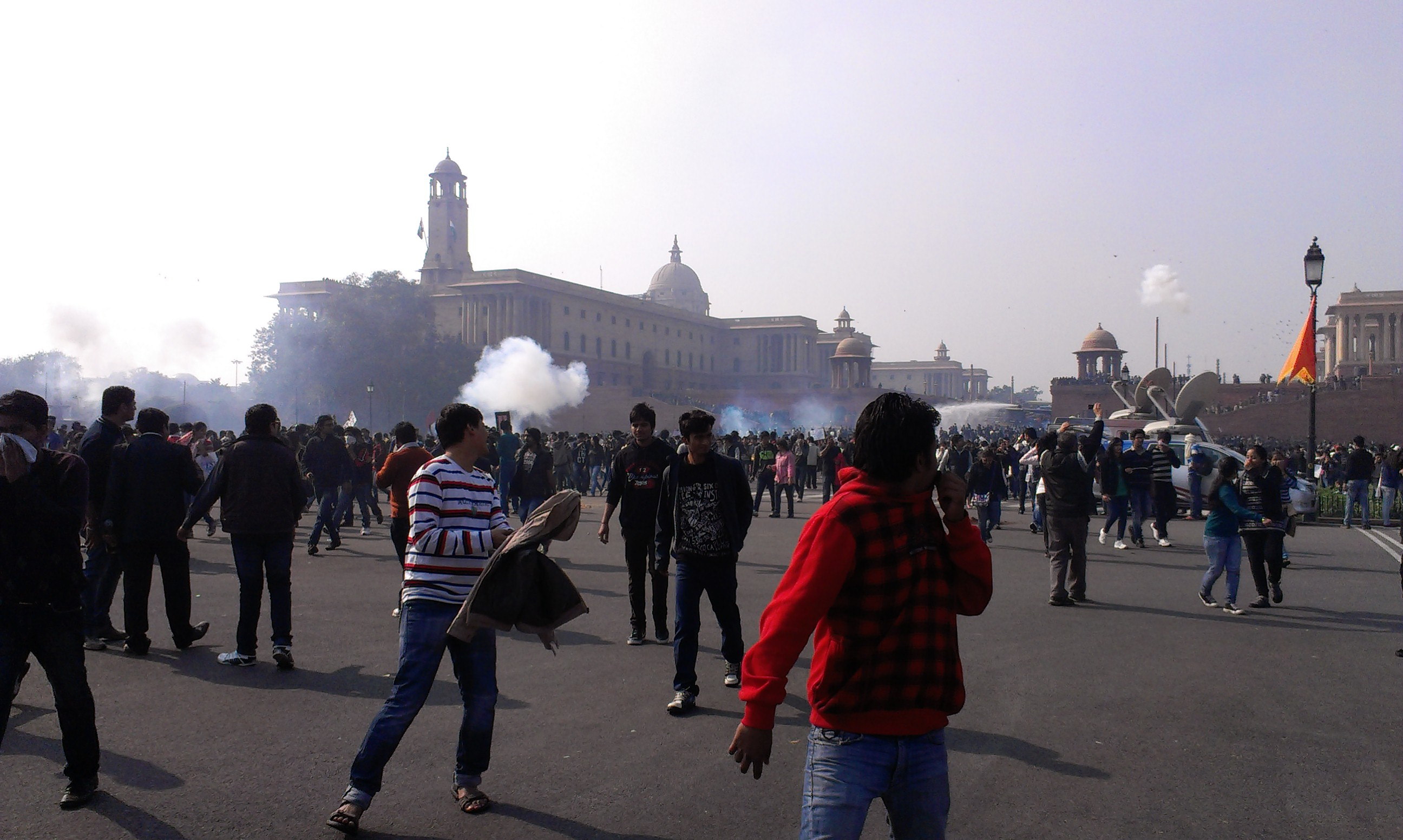
Police used water cannon and tear gas to attempt to break up the protestors.

Seven metro rail stations in New Delhi were closed on 22 December to discourage protesters from gathering at Raisina Hill. On 24 December, police blocked roads leading to India Gate and Raisina Hill to prevent possible mass protests, and closed nine metro stations, affecting thousands of transit patrons. News reporters were not allowed to reach India Gate and Raisina Hill. In addition to Code of Criminal Procedure, 1973 section 144, which disallows assembly of groups larger than five, curfew was imposed near the presidential residence. The Hindustan Times accused police of using excessive force against the protestors, reporting that 375 tear gas canisters were used at India Gate and elsewhere in Delhi to disperse the crowds. An article in Firstpost criticised the Government of India as well, saying that they failed to act positively or give credible assurances to the protesters and instead used police force, lathi-charging, pushing the media out of the scene, and shutting down metro rail stations.

Police stated that peaceful protests had been "hijacked" by hooligans and political activists.

During one protest, a Constable named Subhash Tomar collapsed and later died in hospital. Two witnesses claimed that Tomar collapsed without being hit by any protesters, while a third disputed this. Hospital doctors and the post-mortem gave contradictory reports: he died due to cardiac arrest, but it is not known if the heart attack was caused by blunt-force injuries that he suffered to his chest and neck. Some experts state that his chest injuries may have been a side effect of the administration of CPR. The Delhi Police arrested 8 young men and charged them with Tomar's murder and rioting at India Gate. Later in March 2013, the police admitted in the Delhi High Court they had no evidence against the eight and dropped the murder charges against them. The youths said the move by the commissioner of police to charge them with murder had been "irresponsible".

=== After the victim's death ===
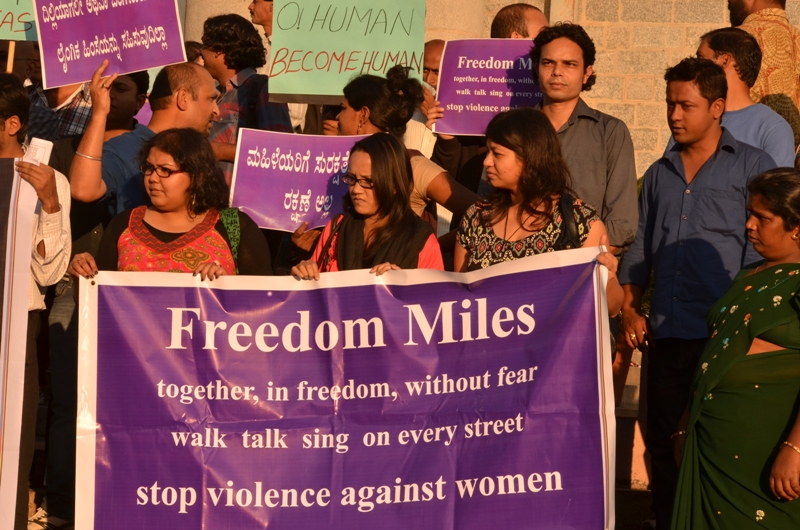
People in Bengaluru protesting outside Bengaluru Town Hall on 30 December 2012

After Jyoti Singh's death on 29 December 2012, protests were staged throughout India, including Kolkata, Chennai, Bengaluru, Hyderabad, Kochi, Thiruvananthapuram, Mumbai, Bhubaneswar and Visakhapatnam. Many of the mourners carried candles and wore black dresses; some pasted black cloth across their mouths.

The following day a large number of people staged protests near Jantar Mantar, New Delhi. There were minor clashes between some groups of protesters and the police; the police then removed some protesters from the area. One group of protesters also observed a one-day hunger strike at Jantar Mantar. All roads leading to India Gate were closed by police and areas where protesters had gathered during the previous week were out of bounds to the public. Some of the protesters drew graffiti and slogans on papers spread on the road, condemning the incident and demanding stricter laws and speedy judgement. The BJP renewed its demand for a special parliament session to discuss the case and to adopt stricter laws on crime against women.

New Year's celebrations were scaled down to a large extent, with the Indian Armed Forces and some clubs and hotels in Delhi cancelling their New Year parties.

The Indian protests also sparked protests across South Asia, including marches and rallies in Nepal, Sri Lanka, Pakistan and Bangladesh. In Nepal, hundreds of demonstrators in Kathmandu called for legal reforms and an overhaul of attitudes to women. In Bangladesh the human rights group Ain o Salish Kendra (ASK) said the protests in Delhi had given fresh impetus to protests against sexual violence. According to an ASK spokesperson, "although previous demonstrations on similar issues were largely dominated by women, men were now protesting too. The protests had also drawn people from a broad range of society."

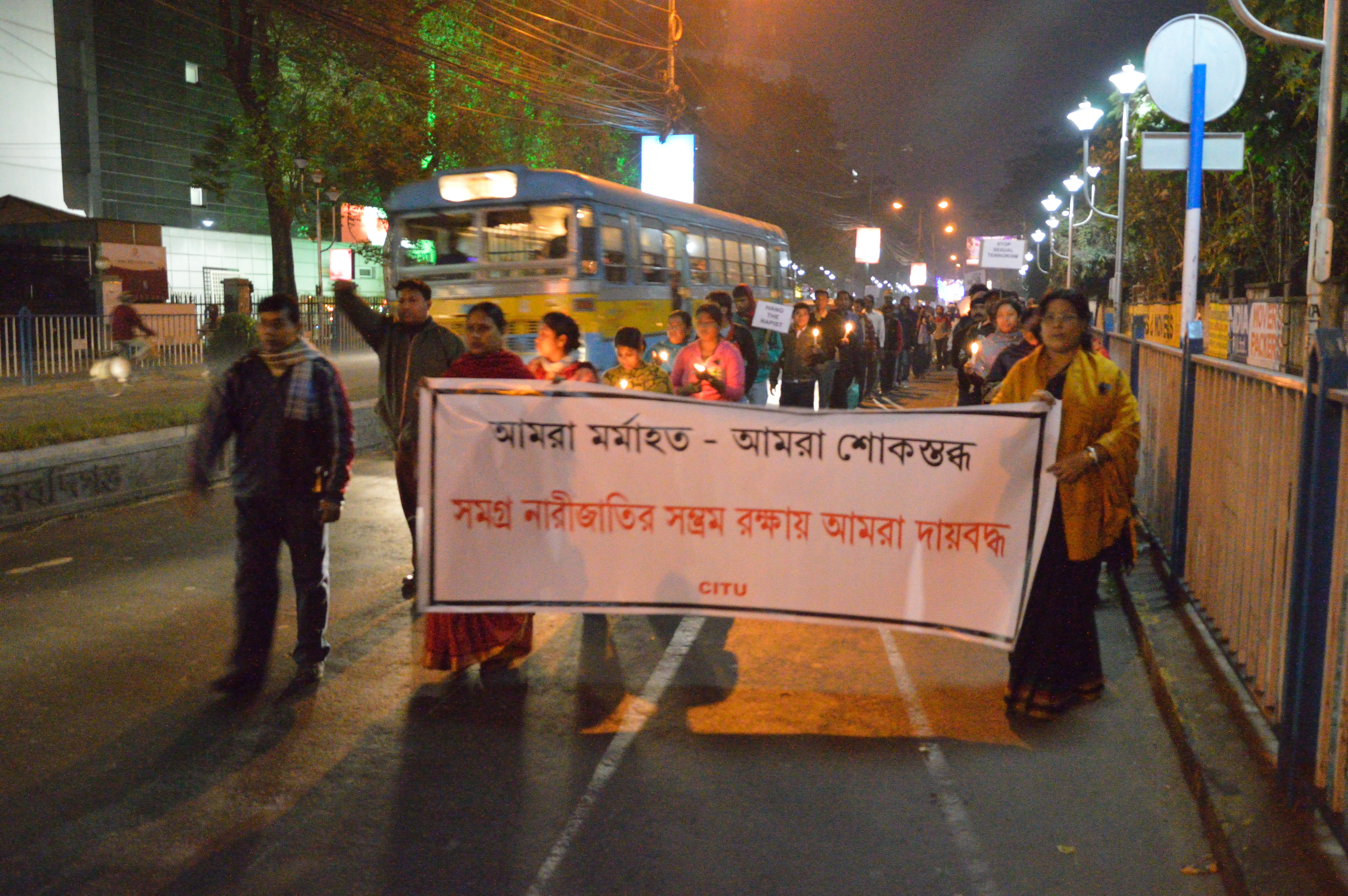
People protest with candlelight tributes at Bidhannagar in Kolkata on 29 December 2012

In Paris, people participated in a march to the Indian embassy where a petition was handed over asking for action to make India safer for women.

An author for the South Asia Analysis Group explained the protests as expressions of middle class angst arising out of a collapse of a social contract between them and the liberal state.New Delhi has the highest number of sex crimes among India's major cities. Police figures show a rape reported on average every 18 hours; reported rape cases rose by nearly 17 percent between 2007 and 2011. Only one of the 706 rape cases filed in Delhi in 2012 saw a successful conviction against the attacker. Between 16 December and 4 January 501 calls for harassment and 64 calls for rape were recorded by the Delhi Police, but only four were followed up by inquiries. The regional program director for United Nations Women South Asia said, "There are rape cases in almost all cities and rural areas, where the victim dies immediately because of the brutality of the crime... This time, it was like, 'Wake up.'"

== Reactions ==
Members of the Indian parliament demanded severe punishment for the perpetrators. then Leader of the Opposition in Lok Sabha, Sushma Swaraj, stated: "The rapists should be hanged". Chairperson of the then ruling United Progressive Alliance Sonia Gandhi visited the Safdarjung Hospital and met doctors on duty in the anesthesia and surgery departments for an update on the woman's health. Bahujan Samaj Party chief, Mayawati, said that proper investigation was required, and that "action should be so strict that no one should dare to act in such a manner again". Actress and Member of the Rajya Sabha Jaya Bachchan said that she was "terribly disturbed" over the incident, and felt "ashamed" sitting in the House, feeling "helpless" for "not being able to do anything". Meira Kumar, the then Speaker of the Lok Sabha, told reporters a "new law should be brought in and must get passed to ensure the safety of women." She went on to say: "The laws at present are not enough, we need stricter laws."

The then Chief Minister of Delhi Sheila Dikshit, said that she did not have the courage to meet the victim and described Delhi as a "rape capital" in interviews. She said that senior police officials should be held accountable for the failure to take adequate measures to stop such incidents and called for "immediate setting up of fast-track courts to try rape cases and to get justice in a time-bound manner". The three constables who had refused to take action upon Ram Adhar's complaint of robbery were suspended for dereliction of duty.

On 24 December 2012, in his first official reaction after the incident, then Prime Minister of India Manmohan Singh appealed for calm, stressing that "violence will serve no purpose". In a televised address, he assured that all possible efforts would be made to ensure the safety of women in India. Singh expressed empathy, saying: "As a father of three daughters I feel as strongly about the incident as each one of you". As a tribute to Nirbhaya, the prime minister cancelled all his official events to celebrate the new year. Then Chief Minister of Uttar Pradesh, Akhilesh Yadav, announced a package of financial assistance ₹2 million (US$21,000) and a government job to her family.

Speaking out against the protesters, President Pranab Mukherjee's son Abhijit Mukherjee argued that the women protesters did not appear to him to be students. He said

What's basically happening in Delhi is a lot like Egypt or elsewhere, where there's something called the Pink Revolution, which has very little connection with ground realities. In India, staging candle-lit marches, going to discothèques ... I can see many beautiful women among them – highly dented-painted ... [but] I have grave doubts whether they're students ...

The remark was widely condemned as sexist. His sister Sharmistha Mukherjee said that she and their father, the president both disapproved. Then Chief Minister of Maharashtra Prithviraj Chavan also expressed disapproval. Abhijit quickly withdrew his comment and apologised. Spiritual guru, and later convicted rapist Asaram also provoked extensive criticism from the public by saying that the victim was also to blame for her own assault because she could have stopped the attack if she had "chanted God's name and fallen at the feet of the attackers".

Following the gruesome crime, several celebrities like Preity Zinta, Shah Rukh Khan, Kareena Kapoor, Amitabh Bachchan, Farhan Akhtar and many more expressed outrages on social medial platforms like Twitter. Many of them demanded that the rapists be castrated or hanged. The incident was later featured in the first episode of Satyamev Jayate season 2. Hosted by Aamir Khan, the episode also dealt with other incidents of rape, as well as the sufferings of rape survivors at the hands of police officers, medical personnel, judicial system, and the general public.

=== International ===
The Embassy of the United States, New Delhi released a statement on 29 December 2012, offering their condolences to Nirbhaya's family and stated, "we also recommit ourselves to changing attitudes and ending all forms of gender-based violence, which plagues every country in the world". Nirbhaya was posthumously awarded one of the 2013 International Women of Courage Awards of the United States Department of State. The citation stated that "for millions of Indian women, her personal ordeal, perseverance to fight for justice, and her family's continued bravery is helping to lift the stigma and vulnerability that drive violence against women."

The crime of rape became a capital offence in India following the rape. Indian politician Mulayam Singh Yadav opposed this change in the law, saying that "Boys will be boys. Boys commit mistakes". Two years later, in response to these comments and another incident of rape that took place in Uttar Pradesh where Yadav's party was governing, United Nations Secretary-General Ban Ki-moon said "We say no to the dismissive, destructive attitude of, 'Boys will be boys'" and stated, "Violence against women must never be accepted, never excused, never tolerated. Every girl and woman have the right to be respected, valued and protected". UN Women called on the Government of India and the Government of Delhi "to do everything in their power to take up radical reforms, ensure justice and reach out with robust public services to make women's lives more safe and secure".

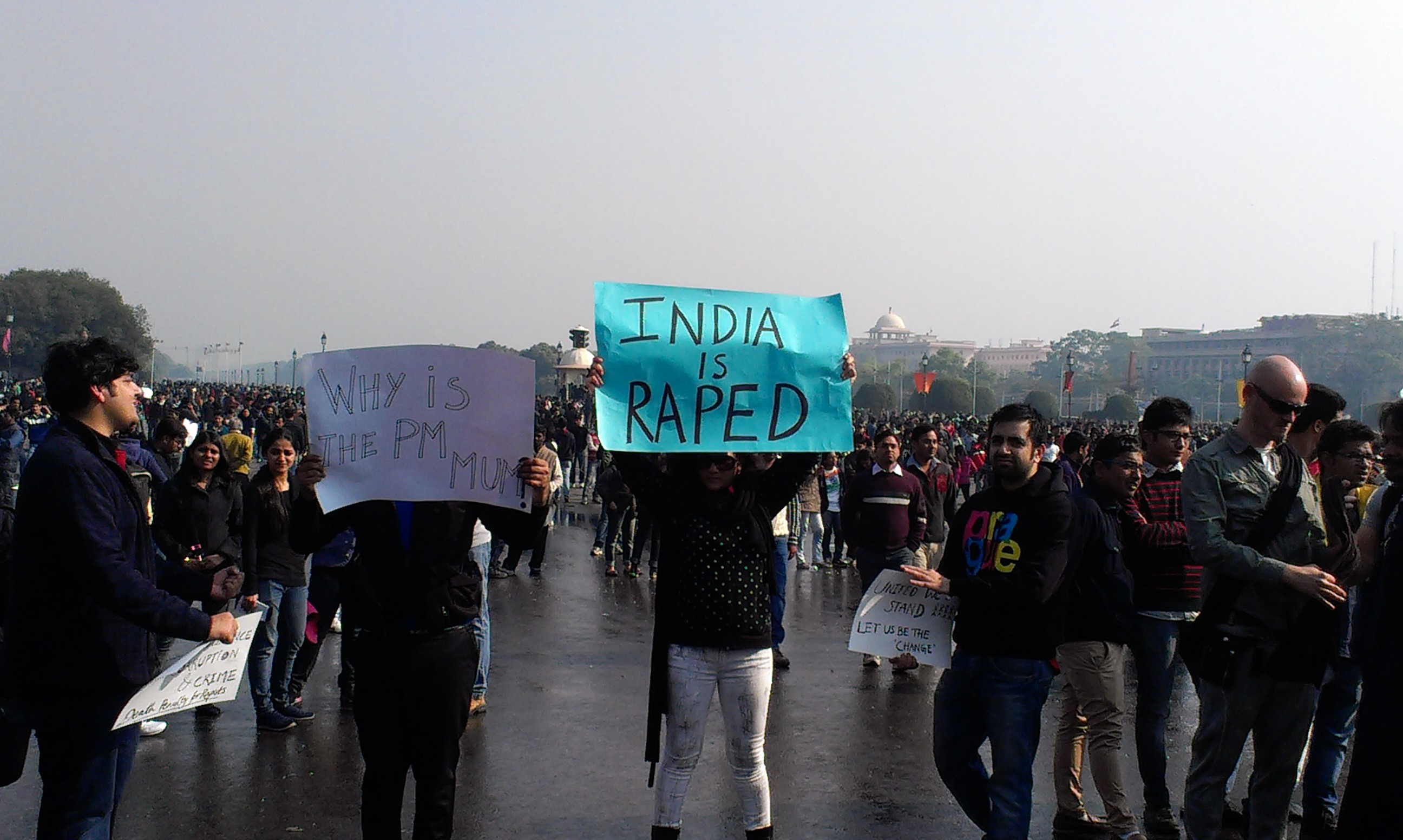
Students voice for women after the 2012 Delhi gang rape

In the wake of remarks against India in Western media, Jessica Valenti, writing in The Nation, argued that such rapes are also common in the United States, but US commentators exhibit a double standard in denying or minimising their systemic nature while simultaneously attacking India for an alleged rape culture. Author and activist Eve Ensler, who organised One Billion Rising, a global campaign to end violence against women and girls, said that the gang rape and murder was a turning point in India and around the world. Ensler said that she had travelled to India at the time of the rape and murder, and she commented:

After having worked every day of my life for the last 15 years on sexual violence, I have never seen anything like that, where sexual violence broke through the consciousness and was on the front page, nine articles in every paper every day, in the centre of every discourse, in the centre of the college students' discussions, in the centre of any restaurant you went in. And I think what's happened in India, India is really leading the way for the world. It's really broken through. They are actually fast-tracking laws. They are looking at sexual education. They are looking at the bases of patriarchy and masculinity and how all that leads to sexual violence.

=== Tourism ===
In the aftermath of the rape case the number of female tourists to India fell by 35% compared to the same period the previous year, according to an industry survey by ASSOCHAM. The Foreign, Commonwealth and Development Office, United Kingdom modified its travel advice and advised women against travelling alone.

In 2014, Minister of Finance Arun Jaitley commented "one small incident of rape in Delhi' advertised world-over is enough to cost us billions of dollars in terms of lower tourism".

== Results of protests ==
In the view of widespread protests, governments at the centre and various states announced several steps to ensure the safety of women. The Government of Karnataka announced the launch of a 24/7 dedicated helpline (1091) to be operated by the state police to register sexual abuse complaints from women. It is also checking the possibility of setting up fast-track courts to dispose of pending cases pertaining to crimes against women. The Government of Tamil Nadu also announced a 13-point action plan to ensure safety of women in Tamil Nadu and said that incidents of sexual assault would be treated as a grave crime, and probes would be entrusted to top police officials. The Chief Minister of Tamil Nadu also said that daily hearings would be conducted in all sexual abuse cases in the state for speedy trials at specially constituted fast-track courts, and women prosecutors would be appointed as government counsels. The Government of Jammu and Kashmir also announced plans to change the state's laws against sexual offenses and gender crimes. The Government of Himachal Pradesh decided to set up state and district-level committees to review progress of all cases of crimes against women.

Despite these state government responses, Singh herself endured great hardship during and after the protests. As one scholar put it, she continued to be "raped" (literally and figuratively): Singh faced a demeaning medical examination, a harsh cross-examination by the court, as well as "salacious media reports" and an insensitive response from society as a whole, including from people who knew her.

=== Justice Verma Committee and changes in law ===
On 22 December 2012, a judicial committee headed by J. S. Verma, a former Chief Justice of India and one of India's most highly regarded Chief Justices and eminent jurists was appointed by the Central government to submit a report within 30 days to suggest amendments to criminal law to sternly deal with sexual assault cases. The committee urged the public in general and particularly eminent jurists, legal professionals, NGOs, women's groups and civil society to share "their views, knowledge and experience suggesting possible amendments in the criminal and other relevant laws to provide for quicker investigation, prosecution and trial, and also enhanced punishment for criminals accused of committing sexual assault of an extreme nature against women." The Committee held its first meeting on 26 December 2012; it had received more than 6,000 emails with suggestions by then. The Justice Verma Committee report was submitted after 29 days, after considering 80,000 suggestions received during the period. The report indicated that failures on the part of the government and police were the root cause behind crimes against women. Suggestions in the report included the need to review the Armed Forces (Special Powers) Act, 1958 (AFSPA) in conflict areas, and setting the maximum punishment for rape as death penalty rather than life imprisonment. The committee did not favour lowering the age of an adult from 18 to 16.

On 26 December 2012, a Commission of Inquiry headed by former Delhi High Court judge Usha Mehra was set up to identify lapses, determine responsibility in relation to the incident, and suggest measures to make Delhi and the wider National Capital Region safer for women. On 1 January 2013, a task force headed by the Union Home Secretary was established to look into women's safety issues in Delhi and review the functioning of the city police force on a regular basis.

On 3 February 2013, the Criminal Law (Amendment) Act, 2013 was promulgated by President Pranab Mukherjee. It provides for amendment of the Indian Penal Code, Indian Evidence Act, 1872, and Code of Criminal Procedure, 1973, on laws related to sexual offences. The ordinance provides for the death penalty in cases of rape. According to Minister of Law and Justice Ashwani Kumar, 90 percent of the suggestions given by the Verma Committee Report were incorporated into the Ordinance. However, critics state that many key suggestions of the commission have been ignored, including the criminalisation of marital rape and trying military personnel accused of sexual offences under criminal law.

In a December 2013 interview, Nirbhaya's parents, Badri Nath Singh and Asha Devi, said they were trying to get the juvenile law changed in such crimes as the rape and murder of their daughter. They petitioned the Supreme Court to try the juvenile in a criminal court instead of a Juvenile court. The juvenile defendant was sent to borstal youth detention for three years and then released. He was just short of 18 years when he committed the crime.

In a March 2015 interview with The Tribune, Ministry of Women and Child Development Maneka Gandhi said that Government is going ahead with a law treating juveniles as adults in grave crimes.

On 22 December 2015, Rajya Sabha passed the revised Juvenile Justice (Care and Protection of Children) Act, 2015, which proposed that the accused of heinous crimes who are above 16 years of age will be treated as an adult in the court of law.

== Legacy ==
=== Anniversary memorials ===
On 16 December 2013, the first anniversary of the attack, activists held memorials throughout New Delhi in memory of the victim widely known as Nirbhaya, meaning "fearless". Members of women's organizations lit candles in her memory and protested against exploitation of women. University students and others organized a candlelight march at the bus stand in South Delhi where Nirbhaya and her friend Pandey boarded the bus in which the rape and beatings took place. At a commemorative prayer meeting political leaders resolved to increase efforts to improve women's security. Speaking with the victim's mother, former Chief Minister of Delhi Sheila Dikshit said that Delhi's society and the various authorities will work together to build a permanent legacy to her daughter: "... whatever you will want in her memory, we will try to fulfil. And we will try with a conviction that such an incident is not repeated with anybody else in the future". The victim's parents spoke at a memorial saying that they were proud of the courage that their daughter showed, which they believe "has spurred more women to speak out instead of hiding the crimes committed against them".

In December 2014, the second anniversary of the attack, referring to a woman who was raped in a car operated by an Uber driver, the parents remarked to the press that not much had changed: "Nothing in India has changed since 16 December 2012. All promises and statements made by our leaders and ministers have turned out to be shallow. Our suffering gives them their moment in limelight. My daughter asks me what I have done to get her justice. She asks what am I doing so that many more like her get justice and I wake up to realise how helpless and trivial I am..."

"Nirbhaya Chetna Diwas", a public event organised by women's and citizens groups, candlelight vigils, prayer meetings, and other events were held on 16 December 2015 at the Jantar Mantar to pay homage to Jyoti on the third anniversary of her death. In what was called "a brave homage to her daughter", Jyoti's mother, Asha Devi, said, "My daughter's name was Jyoti Singh and I am not ashamed to name her. Those who commit heinous crimes like rape, their heads should hang in shame, not the victims' or their families'." Devi spoke out against the upcoming release of the juvenile and put forth four demands for justice:

On the third death anniversary of our death, we are seeing the release of the juvenile convict. Where is justice in that? I do not know whether he is 16 or 18. I only know that he has committed a brutal crime and there should be no age limit for punishment; [...] the juvenile convict should be sentenced to death, fast-track courts be set up in all the courts to offer speedy justice to sexual assault victims, amendments to the Juveniles Justice Act be passed and utilisation of Nirbhaya Fund for setting up high quality forensic labs in all states.

=== Changes to the legal system ===
The outpouring of anger and grief following the rape and murder gave rise to hopes for change in India. The government responded with the passage of several new sexual assault laws, including a mandatory minimum sentence of 20 years for gang rape, and six new fast-track courts created solely for rape prosecutions. As an indicator of the scope of the problem of rape prosecution, the "Nirbhaya" case was the only conviction obtained among the 706 rape cases filed in New Delhi in 2012. Between 16 December 2012 and 4 January 2013, Delhi police recorded 501 allegations of harassment and 64 of rape, but only four inquiries were launched. However, it appears that the "Nirbhaya" case has had an effect on the willingness of rape or molestation victims to report the crime; police records show that during the final nine months of 2013 almost twice as many rape victims filed a police report and four times as many allegations of molestation were made. A recent report released by the National Crime Records Bureau shows that 95 percent of the cases brought to the police were classified as a crime. However, there is a large backlog of cases with fewer than 15 percent of those charged tried in 2012, leaving 85 percent waiting to come to trial.

On 16 December 2013, the first anniversary of the rape was commemorated in London with a public memorial to honour the victim. Speakers included Meera Syal, whose parents are from New Delhi. Speaking of the anger that was expressed at the time of the rape, she said, "We need to hold onto that anger and demand that the Government of India enforces all the promised changes of its recent Criminal Law Amendment Act, which changed laws to expand the definition of rape and incorporated new offences including acid attack, sexual harassment, voyeurism and stalking". She also said that activists need to act in solidarity with other organisations to stop violence against women and girls around the world.

Following the incident the government set up the Nirbhaya Fund for "empowerment, safety and security of women and girl children." The Fund is administered by Department of Economic Affairs of Ministry of Finance. However, an Oxfam India report published in 2021 shows that the fund remains underused and underutilized.

=== Public discussions about violence against women ===
Observers agree that the victim's ordeal has brought a change to public conversations about women's issues, with men joining in the discussions as well. A young woman who had taken part in the protests at the time of the rape said a year later, "A welcome change is that the taboo on discussing rape and sexual violence has been broken. The protests brought debates and discussions to our homes." She also said that since the rape and protests the media is now providing coverage of sexual violence. However, she saw "absolutely no change in the rape culture and related brutality. The streets are not safe. Teasing and catcalling or worse are to be found everywhere. Sexual harassment in public places as well as inside the home is still rampant." She added, "I do acknowledge, however, that a year is too less to undo what patriarchy has done over centuries. It is too embedded in our homes, our institutions and in our laws. The police may be a little more receptive, but it is not out of a sense of duty but out of the fear of censure".

Women in urban spaces in India yet feel unsafe. They report needing to wear clothing that covers their bodies in order to "make them feel safe". Public officials and commentators in India often claim that women who wear "skimpy" clothing and go around partying with other guys "invite these attacks" and thus cannot claim it is rape. In reality, the majority of women actually do not wear Western clothing in public because of the fear of provoking sexual assault.

The discussion surrounding women's attire "provoking assault" is described as victim blaming by government officials, social commentators, men, and even other women. As society and the Indian government have not been able to successfully address the root of the issue, women resort to strategies to feel safe. Some of these "strategies" include ignoring sexual commentary, avoiding direct eye-contact with men, dressing more modestly, and "refrain[ing] from going out at night". This has escalated to women avoiding public spaces altogether including public transportation, feeding into the expectation that women should stay at home and that they belong there. Critics claim that these avoidance tactics are just a band-aid solution to a much deeper issue relating in victim-blaming and lack of accountability for men in Indian society.

A poll in October 2017, the first of its kind in the world, which was published by Thomson Reuters Foundation, found that Delhi was the fourth most dangerous city in the world for women and it was also the worst city in the world for women when it came to sexual violence, rape and harassment.

In response to incident, Safecity, a non-profit organisation and free website, was developed by the Red Dot Foundation and launched in 2012. The website allows users to make anonymous reports of incidents of gender-based harassment, abuse, and violence, and creates maps of these reports which are publicly available to be viewed and downloaded. Safecity has used this data to increase public awareness of sexual harassment, abuse, and violence, and advocate for improvements in public safety measures to prevent sexual violence.

=== Nirbhaya Trust ===
In December 2013, the family of the victim along with social entrepreneur Sarvesh Kumar Tiwari established the Nirbhaya Trust, an institute formed to assist women who have experienced violence to find shelter and legal assistance. Due to the fact that Indian laws do not allow the publishing of a rape victim's name, it was named Nirbhaya which means fearless in Hindi, after the name used by the media. The victim's father stated, "So many people supported us, so... we want [to] help those girls who have no one."

=== Women of India Summit ===
Inspired by the protests and international attention, women's rights activists organized the first Women of India Leadership Summit, later renamed the Women of India Summit, in 2013. It is an annual summit that gathers activists together in order to develop strategies that empower women, especially in the National Capital Region, so that Delhi is no longer known as the "rape capital of the world."

== Artistic depictions of Nirbhaya ==
=== BBC Storyville: India's Daughter ===
India's Daughter (2015) is a documentary film directed and produced by Leslee Udwin, and is part of the BBC's ongoing Storyville series. It was scheduled to be broadcast on International Women's Day, 8 March 2015, in India on NDTV 24x7 and in United Kingdom on BBC Four. On 1 March it was revealed that the filmmakers had interviewed one of the rapists while he was being held in the Tihar jail. Soon, the news was picked up by Indian media outlets. The Government of India blocked its broadcast in India by obtaining a court order on 4 March. The BBC said it would comply with the order and did not broadcast the film in India. In the UK however, the BBC moved the transmission forward to 4 March, and it was shown on that date. The film was also uploaded on YouTube and soon went viral with various shares on social media. On 5 March, the Government of India directed YouTube to block the video in India and YouTube complied with the order. The film has generated a great deal of controversy in both India and worldwide.

Because India does not permit a rape victim's name to be published, the victim was called "Nirbhaya", which means fearless, because of her efforts to fight off her rapists and her insistence on making a detailed statement to the police before she died. However, following the death of their daughter, the parents were quoted in several media articles as saying they had no objections to using their daughter's name. In the film the father states he is "happy" to reveal her name, Jyoti Singh, and on 5 March the father was quoted as saying he thought "everyone should watch the documentary, which showed 'the bitter truth' about attitudes to women in India". Even still, on 6 March, the news outlet The Hindu ran an article "Father objects to revealing gangrape victim's name in 'India's Daughter'" in which they quoted the father as saying that he planned to take legal action because her name was used.

The film's director and producer Leslee Udwin said that it was the courage and bravery shown by the unprecedented numbers of men and women who protested the rape and murder that inspired her to make the film. Speaking in an interview, Udwin said:

Courageous and impassioned ordinary men and women of India braved the December freeze to protest in unprecedented numbers, withstanding an onslaught of teargas shells, lathi charges [baton charges] and water cannons, to make their cry of "enough is enough" heard. In this regard, India led the world by example. In my lifetime, I can't recall any other country standing up with such commitment and determination for women's rights.

In reference to the actual film, Nirbhaya's father, Badrinath Singh, said that India's Daughter "holds up a mirror to society", and that the screening of the film holds a significance in the sense "that the struggle that my daughter was part of continues." Singh has also said that since the death of his daughter "every girl on the street is [now] like a daughter" to him and his wife, and that people in general need to understand that their sons need to be taught to respect women. Speaking on 5 March, Singh said:

My wife and I brought up our children with the sole intention of making them good citizens. I can proudly say that we have achieved that. Our daughter has shown society its true face. She has changed the lives of many young girls. She remains an inspiration even after her death. She fought back those devils. We are proud of our daughter.

— Badrinath Singh

=== Anatomy of Violence by Deepa Mehta ===
Indian-Canadian filmmaker Deepa Mehta's 2016 film Anatomy of Violence was also based on the incident, exploring the social conditions and lack of mental and Sex education in Indian society that made it possible.

=== Crime Patrol: "A Nation Awakens" ===
"A Nation Awakens" is the 296th and 297th special two-part episode of the fourth season of the Sony TV television series Crime Patrol (which features real crime stories) and the 546th and 547th episodes overall. Originally aired in two parts on 21 September and 22 September 2013, the episodes were written by Subramanian S. Iyer and director by R. Amit Kumar Jha. The principal photography of the episodes was held in Mumbai, and was commenced in the first week of January 2013. The episode was hosted by Anup Soni and role of head police inspector was played by Sanjeev Tyagi.

=== Netflix series Delhi Crime ===
Richie Mehta, a Canadian filmmaker, made a seven-part web series titled Delhi Crime in 2019. It was based on the aftermath and the subsequent manhunt of the perpetrators of the case. Starring Shefali Shah, Rasika Dugal and Adil Hussain, the series was released on Netflix. This 7-episode series won the International Emmy Award for Best Drama Series at 48th International Emmy Awards.

=== Literary works ===
Wo desh ki beti' (The daughter of the Nation), poems written and narrated by Sunil Kumar Verma, depicting the national pain at the gang rape of its daughters

The comic book Priya's Shakti was inspired by the Nirbhaya case. The protagonist fights against gender-based sexual violence in India and around the world.

A book on the Nirbhaya case titled Courting Injustice: The Nirbhaya Case and its Aftermath was authored by Rajesh Talwar, and published by Hay House in 2013

On 5 September 2014, Bandaru Dattatreya, a MP and BJP National Vice President, inaugurated "Wo Desh Ki Beti" (Nation's Daughter), a social event at Hyderabad showcasing a collection of sixteen poems authored by Sunil Kumar Verma which depicted the pain of a nation at the gang rape of its daughters.

=== Art ===
Several artists have been inspired to create artworks based on Nirbhaya's story. In January 2014, artists from all over the country came together to hold an art exhibition about Nirbhaya and sexual assault in India. Contemporary scroll painter, Kalam Patua created a painting titled Nirbhaya that was exhibited in The 8th Asia Pacific Triennial of Contemporary Art. Feminist artist Pritika Chowdhry has created several artworks reimagining Nirbhaya as a superheroine. To depict the large number of rape victims every year, she has created a Nirbhaya superheroine, an Anonymous Nirbhaya mask, and more art projects to advocate against sexual assault through art. Polish-American artist Mónica Weiss has created an art memorial for Nirbhaya.

== See also ==
=== General ===
- Death of Anjali Singh
- Capital punishment in India
- Dekh Le, a viral video released on the first anniversary of the incident
- Delhi Crime, Indian drama series based on the incident
- India's Daughter, documentary about the incident
- It's Your Fault (video)
- Nirbhaya Fund
- Nirbheek, revolver named in tribute of the victim
- Nirbhoya, a Bengali film based on the incident
- Priya's Shakti
- Rape in India
- Gender inequality in India
- Slut-shaming
- Victim blaming
- Women in India

=== Rape crimes ===
- Mathura rape case, a 1972 custodial rape
- 1990 Bantala rape case, a 1990 rape-murder case
- Priyadarshini Mattoo, a 1996 rape-murder case
- Ajmer rape case
- Prathibha Srikanth Murthy, a 2005 rape-murder case
- Soumya murder case, a 2011 rape-murder case
- Shakti Mills gang rape
- 2014 Badaun gang rape allegations
- Murder of Özgecan Aslan – psychology student murdered in a bus in February 2015
- Aruna Shanbaug case – left in vegetative state after assault in November 1973, died May 2015
- Nadia nun rape case
- 2017 Unnao rape case
- 2019 Hyderabad gang rape and murder
- 2024 Kolkata rape and murder
