= India's Daughter =

- Directed by: Leslee Udwin
- Written by: Leslee Udwin
- Produced by: Leslee Udwin
- Cinematography: Abhay Anand, Harmeet Basur, Jehangir Choudhary, Mintu Kumar, Narender Kumar, Rajesh Kumar, Faroukh Mistry, Tushar Prakash, Anuradha Singh, Rajiv Singh
- Edited by: Anuradha Singh
- Music by: Krsna Solo
- Production companies: Assassin Films; Tathagat Films
- Distributed by: Berta Film
- Release date: 4 March 2015
- Running time: 63 minutes
- Country: United Kingdom
- Languages: English; Hindi

India's Daughter is a documentary film directed by Leslee Udwin and is part of the BBC's ongoing Storyville series. The film is based on the 2012 Delhi gang rape and murder of 23-year-old Jyoti Singh, aliased "Nirbhaya", who was a physiotherapy student. The documentary explores the events of the night of 16 December 2012, the protests which were sparked both nationally and internationally as a result of the assault, and the lives of the men before they committed the attack. The film is told through the use of reconstructed footage and interviews with those involved in the case, including the defence lawyers, psychiatrists, and one of the rapists.

The film was scheduled to be aired on TV channels around the world on 8 March 2015, to coincide with International Women's Day. However, when excerpts of the film, which included an interview with Mukesh Singh, one of the four men convicted of the rape and murder, were broadcast, a court stay order prohibiting the telecast was obtained by the Indian police. The BBC complied with the request and did not air the film in India. It aired outside India on 4 March, was uploaded on YouTube, and soon went viral via shares on social media. On 5 March, the Indian government directed YouTube to block the video in India. The film was later removed from YouTube by the BBC, citing copyright violation.

== Background ==
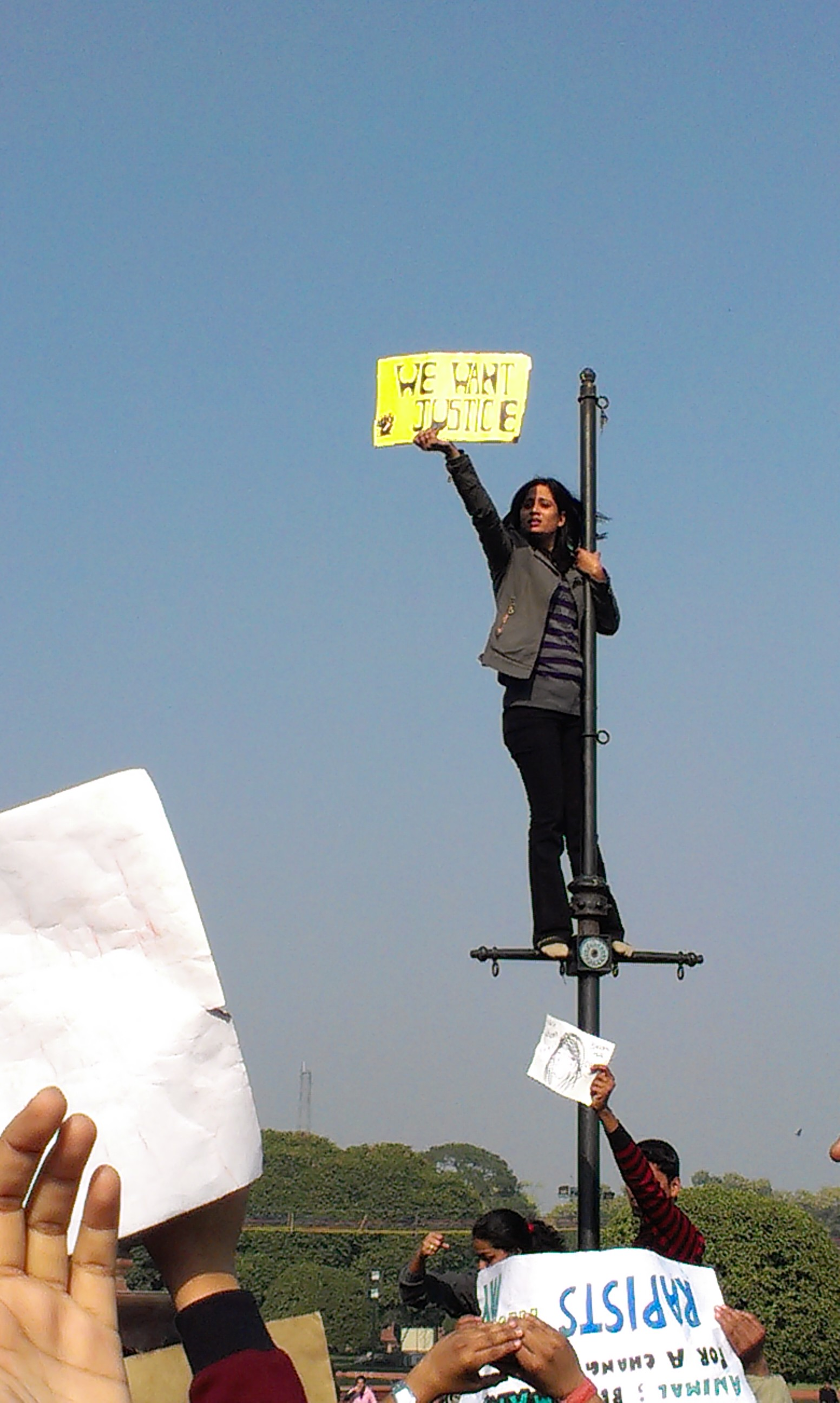
Students protesting at Raisina Hill, Rajpath, December 2012

The documentary is based on the Delhi gang rape, an incident that occurred on 16 December 2012 in South Delhi. The victim, Jyoti Singh, watched the film Life of Pi with a male friend, Awindra Pratap Pandey, after which they boarded a privately run bus to return home. She was assaulted and gang raped on the bus; her friend was also physically assaulted during the incident. Both of them were subsequently thrown from the bus. She received emergency treatment including several surgeries in India and Singapore but died on 29 December 2012 due to the serious nature of the injuries she sustained in the assault.

The incident received widespread media coverage. It was condemned and triggered widespread public protest and criticism of the Indian government for not providing enough protection to women. International media covered the incident only after persistent public protests.

Six men were arrested, including a 17-year-old juvenile, and accused as perpetrators of the assaults. One detainee was found dead in his prison cell, as a result of a possible suicide, although his relatives alleged that he had been murdered. The four accused men were found guilty and sentenced to death, whilst the juvenile was given 3 years imprisonment, under the Juvenile Justice Act.

== History ==
The film is part of the BBC's ongoing Storyville series, as part of a series of international documentaries by a range of film-makers It was planned to be broadcast on International Women's Day, 8 March 2015, in India on NDTV 24x7 and in UK on BBC Four. On 1 March 2015, it was revealed that the film-makers had interviewed one of the rapists while he was being held in the Tihar jail. Soon, the news was picked up by Indian media outlets. The Indian government blocked its broadcast in India by obtaining a court order on 4 March 2015. The BBC said it would comply with the order and did not broadcast the film in India. In the UK however, the BBC moved the transmission forward to 4 March and it was shown on that date. The film has generated a great deal of controversy in both India and worldwide.

Udwin has said it was the protests in response to the rape that drew her to make this film. "I was absolutely awestruck by the ordinary men and women of India who poured out onto the streets in response to this horrific gang rape and who demanded change for women's rights. And I thought the least I could do was amplify their voices." In the month following the attack there were widespread protests across India against violence towards women. Areas across Delhi were closed and methods such as water cannons and tear gas were used in attempts to dispel the large crowds. Likewise, there was a strong social media presence and the circulation of petitions calling for change. The documentary has also sparked debates itself when it was subsequently banned in India, with NDTV refusing to broadcast another show in its place. Likewise, there has been debate over whether the film oversimplifies the case, reinforcing the narrative of 'good' vs 'evil', ultimately creating a two dimensional retelling of the case.

== Production ==
=== Development ===
As a filmmaker and Human Rights Activist, Leslee Udwin's interest in making the film was sparked initially by the enormous numbers of people who protested in India for over a month in response to the rape of Jyoti Singh. She wanted to help give the activists a platform on which their voices would be heard around the world. In addition, Udwin had a desire to understand the mentality of the rapists, wondering why anyone would commit such a brutal attack. She was adamant that the documentary must involve interviews with the rapists from the attack and originally focused her attention exclusively on the rape of Jyoti Singh, a stance which later broadened.

=== Filming ===
To begin with Udwin wrote to the director general of Tihar Jail asking for permission to interview Jyoti Singh's rapists as this was to be at the heart of her documentary; she wanted to know why men raped women. She was granted access and filmed for thirty-one hours over seven days in prison, which she found particularly gruelling. One of the rapists refused to speak to her, whilst Vinay Sharma and Pawan Gupta denied their involvement saying they weren't on the bus that night. Mukesh Singh, the bus driver, readily answered Udwin's questions and for this reason his interview was included in the film. Following these interviews her interest expanded to the wider patriarchal society and the part it plays in fuelling violence towards women and rape in India.

=== Post-production ===
According to Udwin several clips had to be cut during editing. For example, an interview with one of the rapists revealed new information that was to be used in the ongoing case and therefore could not be shown in the film. Further interviews were cut as they were inappropriate to include; one interviewee asked for money on camera whilst the father and brother of another would not allow her to be involved in the film. Udwin says she would have liked to have shown a photo of Jyoti Singh in the film but could not as not only were her parents against the idea, but it was against the law in India to do so.

== Interview ==
One of the convicted rapists, Mukesh Singh, was interviewed for the documentary. He said in the interview "When being raped, she shouldn’t fight back. She should just be silent and allow the rape. Then they’d have dropped her off after ‘doing her’, and only hit the boy." He later added, "A girl is far more responsible for rape than a boy … A decent girl won’t roam around at nine o’clock at night … Housework and housekeeping is for girls, not roaming in discos and bars at night doing indecent things, wearing indecent clothes." A report by the Navbharat Times speculated that Mukesh Singh was paid ₹40,000 (about £420) to do the interview. According to the report, initially he had asked for ₹200,000, but the amount was negotiated down and the sum was given to his family. However, the filmmakers deny that he was paid for the interview.

A. P. Singh, a defence lawyer in the case, was shown saying, "If my daughter or sister engaged in pre-marital activities and disgraced herself and allowed herself to lose face and character by doing such things, I would most certainly take this sort of sister or daughter to my farmhouse, and in front of my entire family, I would put petrol on her and set her alight."

== Release ==
Initially, the film was set to be released on the BBC on 8 March on International Women's Day in 2015 but was banned with short notice by the Indian government due to the Indian Home Minister announcing that Leslee Udwin had failed to obtain permission to interview one of the criminals in prison or allow authorities to view versions of the interview that had not yet been cut. Following the Indian Home Minister's statement, Leslee Udwin went on to release her permission letters. The BBC reacted to the Minister of Home Affairs (India) by rescheduling the film's release in the UK to 11 March 2015. The desire amongst people to see the film spread, as unauthorised copies were released of the film, despite the Indian government's attempt to have the film banned. Jyoti's father himself, Badri Singh, states that 'everybody should see the film'.

India's Daughter was given a U.S.A. theatrical release on 23 October 2015.

A number of productions were made highlighting the events of the 2012 Delhi gang rape; these included Vibha Bakshi's Daughters of Mother India, which focuses on the Government and Indian societies response to the rape. More recently, a YouTube documentary United Kingdom's Daughters by Harvinder Singh, was a response to India's Daughter that put India as a country in a negative light.

Upon India's Daughter release, following the controversy that surrounded the case, the government banned the film, which then pushed the film further into the spotlight, with critics becoming aware of the film and then censored by the Indian Administration. The movement that followed this film's release meant that Jyoti Singh became a 'symbol' of the drive for the change in injustices of violence against women.

During its release, Meryl Streep was amongst the public figures who rallied behind India's Daughter, attending multiple screenings of the film, including one at the World Congress on Family Law and Children's Rights.

== Reception ==
Then U.N. Secretary-General Ban Ki-moon's spokesman Stéphane Dujarric stated on 5 March, "I'm not going to comment on the unspeakable comments that were made by the person accused of raping this girl, but I think the secretary-general has spoken very clearly on the need to halt violence against women and on the need for men to get involved in halting violence against women and decrying it loud and clear every time it occurs."

In an interview on 5 March 2015, the parents of the victim said that everybody should watch the documentary. Bollywood figures including Anushka Sharma, Abhishek Kapoor, Sonal Chauhan, Twinkle Khanna and Punit Malhotra condemned the ban on the same day.

Awindra Pandey, the friend of the victim who was injured in the attack, said, "The facts are hidden and the content is fake. Only Jyoti and I know what happened on that night and the documentary is far from truth."

=== Negative perceptions ===
The Indian government was aware of the negativity that this film would bring; they were quick to try to ban the release of the film anticipating the ethical and legal problems that would follow with this film's release.

There have been questions raised around the rape and the 'cinematic interrogation' that have brought a number of different tensions with the film displaying interviews from the perpetrators themselves about the incident and their ideals of rape and the woman.

The impact of tourism was a worry to the Indian government with the film showing India in a negative light.

Negativity was projected onto Leslee Udwin following the release of the film; she was accused of using 'bribery' for the interviews with the convicted rapists. Udwin responded by claiming she remained 'ethical' throughout the filming process.

Some believe the film has brought 'nothing new' and the purpose of the audience being blurred.

Feminist campaigner Kavita Krishnan, who appears in the film, praised aspects of the film but stated that the film's title reinforces patriarchal attitudes that Indian women are expected to "behave themselves". She says that the film is part of a wider "white saviour" mentality. She also said the film failed to profile Indian men who are "on the side of law and order and morality". Christopher Booker, columnist for The Telegraph, said that by leaving out comparison to the number of rapes in other countries that previews of the documentary reportedly included, the film reinforced the stereotype of Indian men as sexual predators to an exceptional degree.

Meenakshi Lekhi, a Bharatiya Janata Party spokesperson, claimed that in screening the documentary on BBC 4 – which she falsely claimed was a channel that did not cover "social" issues – filmmakers didn't stick to the stated objective of a "social purpose" and were instead trying to benefit "commercially" by creating controversies, despite the fact that BBC 4 – like all BBC channels in the UK – does not show and is not funded by advertising.

=== Positive perceptions ===
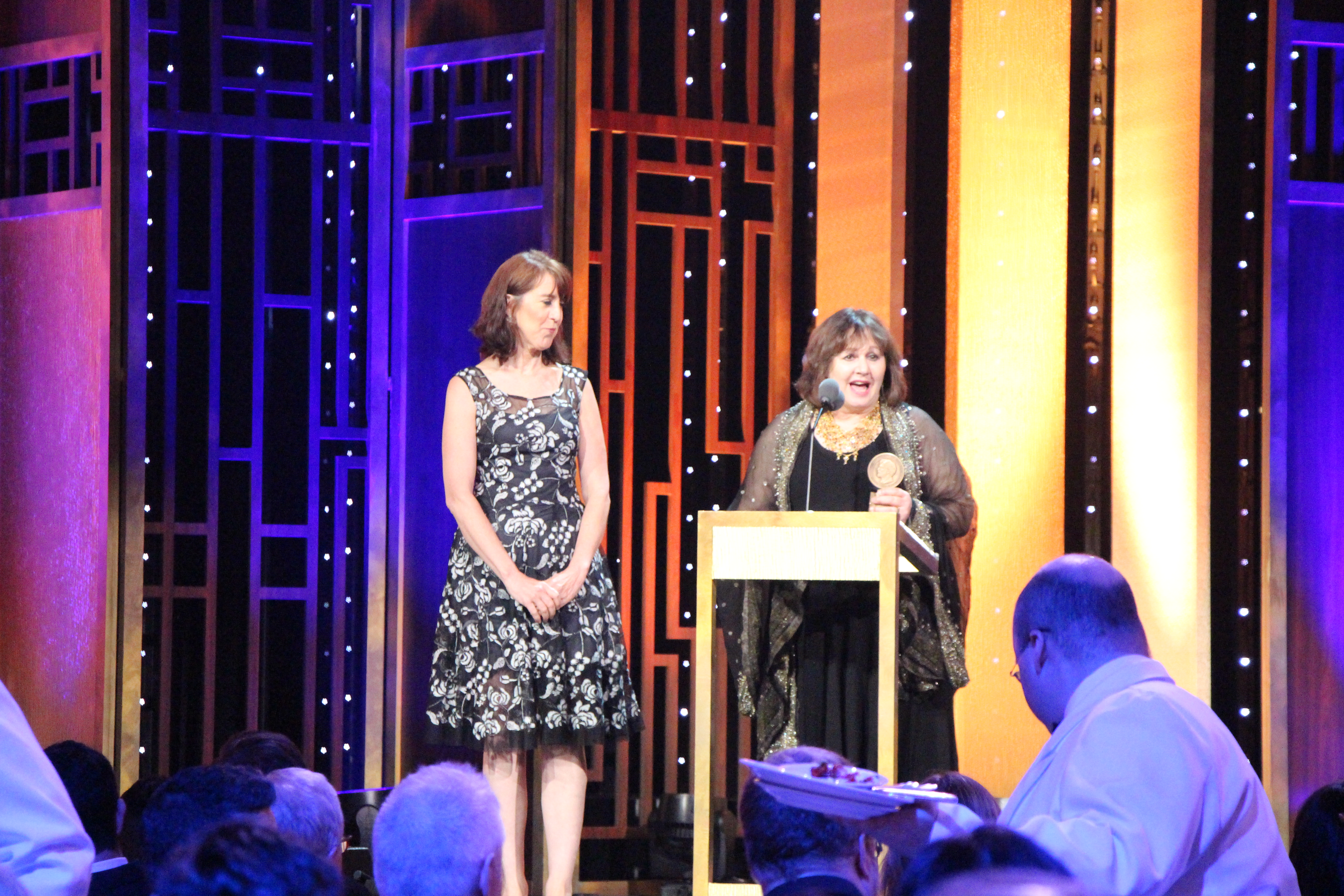
Lois Vossen (left) and Leslee Udwin (right) at the 75th Annual Peabody Awards

Meryl Streep and Freida Pinto, actresses and ambassadors of Because I Am a Girl, expressed their support to the director and film. On 9 March, the documentary film screened during an event at Baruch College, New York City. Freida Pinto used her social media outreach for action on Twitter to target Prime Minister of India.

The Guardian are amongst some of the positive reviews that India's Daughter acclaimed, describing the film as 'essential viewing' and notes how Leslee Udwin juxtaposes the 'light' of Jyoti Singh with the 'darkness' of depiction of the rapists.

== Accolades ==
Award	Year	Category	Recipients	Result	Ref.
Kering Corporate Foundation in association with the Gucci Tribeca Documentary Fund	2014	Spotlighting Women Documentary Award	India's Daughter	Won	
Asian Media Awards	2015	Best Investigation	Leslee Udwin	Won	
Bahamas International Film Festival	2015	Spirit of Freedom Documentary Award - Best Film	Leslee Udwin	Won	
Biografilm Festival	2015	Audience Award - Biografilm Contemporary Lives	Leslee Udwin	Won	
Peabody Awards	2015	Independent Lens	Assassin Films, BBC Storyville, UK-INDIA, and Tathagat Films in association with Gramini Plyatissa Foundation, DR, Plus Pictures	Won	
San Diego International Film Festival	2015	Festival Award - Best Documentary	Leslee Udwin	Won	
Stuttgart Indian Film Festival	2015	Audience Award	India's Daughter	Won	
United Nations Association Film Festival	2015	Grand Jury Award for Best Documentary	India's Daughter	Won	
Women Film Critics Circle Awards	2015	Adrienne Shelly Award	India's Daughter	Nominated	
Women Film Critics Circle Awards	2015	Best Documentary by or About Women	India's Daughter	Nominated	
Motion Picture Sound Editors, USA	2016	Golden Reel Award - Best Sound Editing - Short Form Documentary in Television	Resul Pookutty (supervising sound editor, sound designer, supervising dialogue/adr editor) Amrit Pritam Dutta (supervising sound editor, sound designer) Vijay Kumar (supervising foley editor, sound effects editor) Karnail Singh (foley artist) Sajjan Choudhary (foley artist) Sampath Alwar (sound effects editor, dialogue/adr editor) Krsna Solo (music editor)	Won	

== Ban in India ==
On 1 March 2015, the film-makers revealed that they had interviewed one of the rapists, when he was being held in the Tihar jail. The news was picked up by Indian media outlets soon afterwards. The statements made by the convict created a public outcry in India.

The Delhi Police filed a First Information Report (FIR) on 3 March against the filmmakers under Sections 505 (Statements conducing to public mischief), 504 (Intentional insult with intent to provoke breach of the peace), 505(1)(b) (With intent to cause, or which is likely to cause, fear or alarm to the public), 509 (Word, gesture or act intended to insult the modesty of a woman) of the Indian Penal Code and Section 66A of the Information Technology Act, 2000 (Punishment for sending offensive messages through communication service). The Deputy Commissioner of Police (Economic Offences Wing) of New Delhi, Rajneesh Garg said, "These excerpts of the interview as published are highly offensive and have already created a situation of tension and fear among women in society. Therefore, in the interest of justice and maintenance of public order, an application was made in court seeking restraining order from publishing, transmitting, uploading and broadcasting the interview."

The Indian government blocked the broadcast in India by obtaining a court order on 4 March 2015. BBC sources said they would comply with the order in India. In the United Kingdom, however, the BBC broadcast the film on the evening of 4 March. The film was also uploaded to YouTube, and soon went viral with several shares on the social media. On 5 March, the Indian government requested that YouTube block the video in India and YouTube complied the same day. NDTV expressed its silent protest by screening flickering lamp on a black screen during the scheduled time slot.

On 4 March in the Indian Parliament, Home Minister Rajnath Singh said, "Our government condemns the incident of December 16, 2012 in the strongest possible terms and will not allow any attempt by any individual, group or organisation to leverage such unfortunate incidents for commercial benefit. The respect and dignity of women, constitutes a core value of our culture and tradition. Our government remains fully committed to ensuring safety and dignity of women." Rajya Sabha member Javed Akhtar said, "It's good that this documentary has been made. Crores of men in India have now come to know that they think like a rapist. If it is sounding dirty, they have to think." (A crore is equal to ten million.)

The film's director, Leslee Udwin, appealed to the Indian Prime Minister, Narendra Modi, to lift the ban in India on 4 March 2015.

On 5 March, Tihar Jail authorities sent a legal notice to the filmmakers. They claimed that the filmmakers had violated the conditions under which they were given permission to film inside the prison. They claimed they had been screened a shorter version of the documentary and also said that they asked the producers to delete the interview with the convict. Udwin denied this saying that she had submitted 16 hours of "raw, unedited footage", but the review committee told her after watching three hours of it, "We can’t sit through all this, it’s too long." She said that she then submitted an edited version that was cleared.

On 6 March the Bar Council of India sent a show cause notice to the two lawyers, M. L. Sharma and A. P. Singh, who had made misogynistic statements in the documentary.

On 7 March Najma Heptullah, the Minority Affairs Minister, blamed the previous UPA government for allowing the film to be made. She said she fully supports Home Minister Rajnath Singh's stance on the subject.

On 8 March Siddaramaiah, the Chief Minister of Karnataka, criticised the BBC for giving priority to the film. An email posted on Quora, which showed a German professor of Leipzig University rejecting an Indian male student's internship because of the "rape problem in India", went viral. The professor later apologised to the student. The German Ambassador to India, Michael Steiner tried to contain damage and criticised the professor in an open letter.

A Public Interest Litigation was filed in the Delhi High Court to lift the stay order on the broadcast of the documentary. The petitioners claimed the ban violated freedom of expression under Article 19 of the Indian Constitution. On 12 March 2015, the Court said the ban cannot be lifted as the appeals of the convicts are under trial in the Supreme Court of India. There has been no change in the status of the ban in India because the convicts have been under trial. In 2020, their death penalty sentence by hanging has been ordered by the Magistrates Court to happen on 20 March 2020. There has been no word on what the status of the film's ban in India will be after the convict's deaths.

== See also ==
- Censorship in India
- Geeta and Sanjay Chopra kidnapping case, a 1978 case in which the death row convicts were allowed to be interviewed
- Nirbhaya Fund, projects to utilize on dignity and ensuring safety of women in India
- Nirbheek, India's first revolver for women
- Rape in India
