= Satyamev Jayate season 2 =

The second season of Satyamev Jayate premiered on 2 March 2014. While Hindi is the show's primary language, it was dubbed and simulcast in Bengali, Malayalam, Marathi, Tamil and Telugu.

The second season was supposed to have three installments. The first installment, consisting of five episodes, was aired in March 2014. The second installment was ready in July 2014, and aired in September 2014.

== Episodes ==
=== Episode 1: Fighting Rape ===
Episode 1 began with the 2012 Delhi Gang Rape Case. It highlighted facts and figures about rape incidents and focused on the problems that prevent survivors from getting justice, ranging from the following factors -

- An Apathetic Police Force - In conversation with Shamina Shafiq from NCW, she stated that police officials often refuse to file reports despite mandatory in the law, and instead blame the victim for the crime, suggest a compromise with the culprits, and sometimes even lock-up the victim or her kin, apart from police officers committing the gruesome crime themselves inside the police stations. Furthermore, Shafiq added that while the law states that a copy of the FIR is to be given to the victim, it often does not happen, which leads to inconsistency during trials, as oral statement can differ from FIR.
- Incompetence of Medical Personnel - As per Dr. Sangeeta Rege and Dr. Nikhil Datar, both part of an NGO named CEHAT, most doctors or nurses often do not tend to the rape victims immediately due to attention towards other patients, along with a lack of a standardized procedure to treat victims and collect evidence for a stronger conviction. Furthermore, the episode highlights that doctors cannot deny treatment or first aid to rape survivors. CEHAT formulated gender sensitive treatment to change mindset of doctors towards women, and developed a standardized protocol for medical examination and to collect evidence.
- Judicial Insensitivity - Stories unfolded during the episode that rape victims/survivors are often humiliated in courts by defense lawyers as a tactic to ensure they do not visit the courts after initial hearings, to ensure culprits walk free and the case is closed. Several lawyers and activists have stated about hearings being adjourned for implausible reasons, which delay proceedings, as well as the unfair and unequal legal processes in cases of rape. Aamir, in conversation with retired Delhi High Court judge Justice Usha Mehra, stated that setting up One-Stop Rape Crisis Centers could ensure speedy justice to the victims.
- The Societal Attitudes of Victim Blaming - Aamir condemned this mindset after hearing several stories of victims being blamed and ostracized in the community, as many activists stated the irrelevant reasons to blame rape victims, such as clothing, life-choices. In his conclusion, he stated that by blaming the victims, the culprits receive encouragement.

A survey that was conducted in Madhya Pradesh in 2013 that reported that 48% of the victims were wearing salwar kurta, 41% were clad in sari and 10% of toddlers wore frocks and pyjamas at the time of the incident.

=== Episode 2: Indian Police ===
Episode 2 highlights the issues faced by the police. It talks about the attempts made to introduce reform and protect police from political interference. The episode split into the following portions that stated about challenges faced -

- A Ruler's Police Force - As per top current and retired police officers, state governments fail to provide basic resources for patrolling and investigation, including contingency funds to maintain law and order. Furthermore, retired DGP of Uttar Pradesh Prakash Singh stated on the show that political interference is rampant for transfer, suspension, promotion, or giving desired postings to police officers. Singh's PIL in Supreme Court on political interference and police reforms was also highlighted. Aamir also shared how personnel are not reimbursed for expenses like conducting recovery and disposal of remains, post mortem, or official travel.
- A Broken System - Around 92% of the force is made up of constables, who are overworked, underpaid, compelled to live in cramped housing which are in poor conditions, suffer from health problems, and forced to obey orderlies of senior officers. Corruption in police force further affects the constabulary. The section also highlights the use of force within custody instead of scientific evidence leading to custodial deaths, along with psychological implications of difficult working conditions.
- Reforms From Within - Visiting guest Bipin Gopalkrishna, the DGP of Karnataka CID, has stated that the Police Act of 1861, was brought in to prevent mutiny and suppress protests during the colonial era, which is not relevant in current times. He also stated that in western nations, each officer starts as a constable, while in India, police recruitment happens at different ranks - Constable, Sub-Inspector, State Service, and IPS, causing a disunity in force. DGP Gopalkrishna concluded by saying the idea of having single entry into the force i.e. constable has been opposed by ruling establishment and senior officers as the current system benefits them.

The episode also featured reforms made by Kerala Police under retired DGP Jacob Punoose, who stated that under Janamaithri Suraksha Project, registering FIRs was mandatory, and that each constable would retire as a Sub-Inspector. Another officer, Deputy Commissioner Suresh Khopade, started mohalla committees in the communally-sensitive Bhiwandi town of Maharashtra, which ensured peace during the 1992 riots, and it was carried forward by his successor Gulabrao Pol. The episode concluded with Aamir discussing reforms in police with Julio Ribeiro, which the latter believes should be led by senior officers.

=== Episode 3: Don't Waste your Garbage ===
This episode highlighted the importance of waste management, negligence from the municipal corporations of Indian cities in managing trash efficiently. It showed simple, sustainable ways of recycling and reusing waste. Every year 1,60,000 megatons of waste is generated in India; about 1.5 tons of waste per head per month.

=== Episode 4: Kings Every Day ===
This episode highlights how politicians and government officials in a joint venture swallow public money raised from taxes. It mentions scams worth thousands of crores. It focuses on the fact that it is important to pay taxes and to be aware of what happens to the money.

=== Episode 5: Criminalization of Politics ===
This episode highlights how criminals enter into Indian political life. Aamir Khan focused on politicians' criminal records and showed how commoners display no apprehensions in demanding money for their votes. While a section of voters think their votes don't matter, another group of voters willingly sells their votes for TV sets, money and refrigerators.

== Music ==
Sona Mohaptra came up with Bekhauff. Sona Mohaptra concluded the subject matter with Ram Sampath's composition. In the last episode Shankar Mahadevan sings about the importance of the vote.

== See also ==
- Satyamev Jayate (talk show)
- Satyamev Jayate (season 1)
- Satyamev Jayate (season 3)
