= Amarendra Sharan =

Indian lawyer (1949–2019)

Amarendra Sharan (1949–2019) was Additional Solicitor General of India from 2004 to 2009 and a designated senior attorney at the Indian Supreme Court. He appeared in a number of prominent cases including coal allocation and 2G scam cases on behalf of the CBI, the Priyadarshini Mattoo case, and the re-investigation of Mahatma Gandhi's murder.

== Early life and education ==
Amarendra Sharan was born in Patna, Bihar on 23 October 1949. His father was an income tax commissioner and his mother a housewife. He graduated from Patna Law College in 1975 and started his practice in Patna High Court.

== Career ==
Sharan moved to Delhi to practice in the Supreme Court of India in 1981. He was designated a Senior Attorney by the Supreme Court of India in 2000. In 2003, he was appointed as a member of the Mashelkar Committee (named after its chairman, R.A. Mashelkar, former director-general of Council of Scientific and Industrial Research (CSIR), constituted to examine the problem of spurious/substandard drugs in the country. As Additional Solicitor General, he argued the Priyadarshini Mattoo case and defended reservation under the constitution. In 2008, Sharan received an award for Outstanding Contribution for the Development of Scientific Jurisprudence on National Law Day. In 2009, he was appointed by the All India Football Federation to arbitrate a case between Bhaichung Bhutia and owner of Mohun Bagan owner, whereby he granted interim relief to Bhutia to play as a free agent.

In 2017, he was appointed amicus curiae (friend of the court) in the re-investigation of Mahatma Gandhi's murder, where he argued that there was no reason to re-investigate the case and the case was closed. He was also appointed amicus curiae in Scheduled Castes and Scheduled Tribes (Prevention of Atrocities) Act, where he advocated that Section 18 of the Act, which did not allow anticipatory bail, was unconstitutional.

In 2018 and 2019, Sharan argued several prominent cases including representing CBI in coal block allocation case, and the CBI v. CBI case. He was appointed to the Medical Council of India, and successfully argued for instituting a common national entrance exam for all public medical colleges in India (NEET), and later argued for removing the upper age limit for NEET exams.

== Politics ==
Sharan was a senior leader in the Nationalist Congress Party and served as its spokesperson.
