= Pink Revolution =

Pink Revolution may refer to:

- Tulip Revolution or Pink Revolution, a 2005 revolution in Kyrgyzstan
- Pink Revolution in India, refers to meat production in India
- Pink Revolution (album), a 2016 album by Apink
