= Child Welfare Committee =

Indian institution

A Child Welfare Committee is an autonomous institution in India formed under the Juvenile Justice Act, 2015 to handle and resolve complaints relating to children who are either abandoned, orphaned, voluntarily given away by parents, or lost and who are in need of care on issues relating to growth, protection, treatment, development, and rehabilitation, and includes provision of requirements for their basic needs and protection. Such children are taken into care by a Child Welfare Committee, and the Juvenile Justice Act recommends that each district should have a minimum of one such Committee.

== History and objective ==
A Child Welfare Committee in India is an autonomous institution formed to help children in need of care and protection such as those abandoned, orphaned, given away, or lost, under the Juvenile Justice Act 2015 for issues relating to their protection, treatment, development and rehabilitation and includes provision for their basic needs and protection. Each district in India should have at least one Child Welfare Committee as per the Juvenile Justice Act, 2015 recommendations.

== Composition ==
Child Welfare Committees in each district of India should have one chairperson and four members with a tenure of each committee being three years. Among the included members there should be a woman and child related issues specialist.

== Member eligibility ==
Following are the eligibilities to become member of Child Welfare Committee

- A Chairperson or member should not receive or had received any foreign contribution in their personal capacity either as an individual or organisation.
- The person should not have a past record of violating Child rights or human rights.
- The person who wants to become its Chairperson or member should not have been convicted in the past of any moral turpitude.
- The person should not have been suspended in the past from the services of Central or State Government.
- The person should not have been found guilty in the past of any abuse involving children or employing them.

== Powers ==
Child Welfare Committee has the powers of Metropolitan Magistrate or a Judicial Magistrate (First Class) bestowed as per Criminal Procedure Code, 1973.

== See also ==
- Child protection
