= Prathibha Srikanth Murthy =

Rape and murder victim (1977–2005)

- Born: 1 May 1977; Karnataka, India
- Died: 13 December 2005 (aged 28); Bangalore, India
- Occupation: BPO Employee

Prathibha Srikanth Murthy was a 28-year-old BPO employee of HP Globalsoft (the BPO arm of Hewlett-Packard), who was raped and killed on 13 December 2005, after leaving home for her night shift.

== Significance of the case ==
It was a murder that made companies change their policies towards safety of working women, a crime that made police debate about night shifts for women employees and NGOs demanding nothing less than capital punishment for Shivakumar, the taxi driver charged with murdering Pratibha.

== Early background and personal life ==
Prathibha was barely 15 days old when her father died in a stove burst in 1977. Her mother's name is Gowramma Pratibha was married to Pawan Shetty, a private company employee. She joined HP Globalsoft in 2005 after her marriage. Gowramma claimed that her son-in-law and in-laws never battled to bring justice to Prathibha. After Prathibha died, her husband has left Bangalore and remarried.

== The murder ==
On 13 December 2005, Shiva Kumar called Prathibha Murthy on the mobile and misled her into believing that the regular driver, Jagdish, was on leave and he had been given the task of dropping her at the office. Kumar then took the victim to a deserted place, where he raped her and slit her throat. He dumped the body in a pit nearby, where it was found three days later. Kumar was arrested on the basis of Jagdish's statements.

== Trial Court judgment ==
The trial related to Prathibha's murder was done in the Seventh Fast Track Sessions Court, Bangalore. The trial started in January 2007, but was later shifted to a fast track court in December 2009. The court examined 64 witnesses. Shiva Kumar reportedly told the police that he committed the crime since he was starved of sex and hence frustrated ever since his wife became pregnant (Shiva Kumar's wife was seven months into her pregnancy when Prathibha was murdered. She delivered after he was arrested, and then left him soon after). The trial revealed that Shiva Kumar had tried to collect two women that same night before Prathibha. The first had already left for work when he phoned her; the second found it strange that he did not know the directions to her house, and chose not to use him for her ride to work. He later retracted the statement in court. The public prosecutor sought death sentence to the accused. There were three more accused, apart from Shivakumar who was the cab driver. In October 2010, the fast track court held cabbie Shiva Kumar guilty of kidnapping, raping and slaying Prathibha Murthy. The case took over four years to reach conclusion despite being handled by 11 fast task courts. The 11th Fast Track Court (FTC) judge BV Guddal awarded life imprisonment till death sentence to Shivkumar, five years after the crime was committed. He also sentenced the accused to 10 years rigorous imprisonment and Rs10,000 fine for the charge of kidnapping under section 366 of the IPC and in case of failure to do so one year additional RI. The driver was given another 10 years rigorous imprisonment for charge of rape under section 376 of the IPC and a fine of Rs20,000, in case of failure to do so, two years additional RI.

== Supreme court direction ==
In February 2008, Supreme Court of India declined to re-examine the contentions of Som Mittal, former Managing Director of Hewlett-Packard Global Soft Ltd (HP) and president of the National Association of Software and Services Companies (NASSCOM), for quashing the FIR lodged against him by Karnataka police, for violating the aforementioned statutory orders.

== See also ==
- Murder of Jessica Lal
- Priyadarshini Mattoo
- Bhanwari Devi
