= Juvenile Justice (Care and Protection of Children) Act, 2000 =

Act of the Parliament of India

Parliament of India
- Long title: An Act to consolidate and amend the law relating to juveniles in conflict with law and children in need of care and protection, by providing for proper care, protection and treatment by catering to their development needs, and by adopting a child-friendly approach in the adjudication and disposition of matters in the best interest of children and for their ultimate rehabilitation through various institutions established under this enactment.
- Citation: Act No. 56 of 2000
- Territorial extent: Whole of India
- Enacted by: Parliament of India
- Assented to: 30 December 2000
- Commenced: 1 April 2001

Amended by
- Juvenile Justice (Care and Protection of Children) Act, 2015
- Status: Repealed

The Juvenile Justice (Care and Protection of Children) Act, 2000 is the primary legal framework for juvenile justice in India. The act provides for a special approach towards the prevention and treatment of juvenile delinquency and provides a framework for the protection, treatment and rehabilitation of children in the purview of the juvenile justice system. This law, introduced in compliance with the 1989 UN Convention on the Rights of the Child (UNCRC), repealed the earlier Juvenile Justice Act of 1986 after India signed and ratified the UNCRC in 1992. In the wake of the Delhi gang rape (16 Dec 2012), the law suffered a nationwide criticism owing to its helplessness against crimes where juveniles get involved in heinous crimes like rape and murder. In 2015, responding to the public sentiment, both the houses of parliament in India further amended the bill that proposed adult-like treatment for juveniles aged 16–18 above accused of heinous crimes. The lower house, i.e. Lok Sabha passed the bill on 7 May 2015 and the upper house, i.e. Rajya Sabha on 22 December 2015. The bill was approved by President Pranab Mukherjee's assent on 31 December 2015.

The Act is considered to be extremely progressive legislation and the Model Rules 2007 have further added to the effectiveness of this welfare legislation. However, the implementation is a very serious concern even in 2013 and the Supreme Court of India is constantly looking into the implementation of this law in Sampurna Behrua Versus Union of India and Bachpan Bachao Andolan Versus Union of India. In addition to the Supreme Court, the Bombay and Allahabad High Courts are also monitoring implementation of the Act in judicial proceedings. In order to upgrade the Juvenile Justice Administration System, the Government of India launched the Integrated Child Protection Scheme (ICPS) in 2009-10 whereby financial allocations have been increased and various existing schemes have been merged under one scheme.

A separate petition titled Deepika Thusso Versus State of Jammu and Kashmir is also pending consideration before the Supreme Court on implementation of the Juvenile Justice Act, 1997 which is applicable in the State of Jammu and Kashmir.

Based on a resolution passed in 2006 and reiterated in 2009 in the Conference of Chief Justices of India, several High Courts have constituted "Juvenile Justice Committees" headed by sitting judges of High Courts. These committees supervise and monitor implementation of the Act in their jurisdiction.

== History of juvenile justice legislation in India ==
The original Juvenile Justice Bill only held children from 7-12 legally responsible for their crimes if the crimes were heinous, and children from 12-14 legally responsible for their crimes for other crimes. These juveniles were punished with a maximum of three years in rehabilitation centre, no matter the magnitude of the crime. The most important impact of the Juvenile Justice Act of 2000 was that it shifted the age criterion for the legal definition of a child from 14 years and below to 18 years and below. There were many other valuable revisions surrounding child marriage and immoral trafficking, as well.

After the passing of the 2000 Act, a revamped Juvenile Justice Bill was passed in the Lok Sabha on 7 May 2015 in the aftermath of the Delhi Rape Case of December, 2012 in which a minor was found guilty. The new bill will raise the maximum sentence to seven years for serious crimes, and allow minors in the age group of 16-18 to be tried as adults if they commit heinous crimes. The heinous crime will be examined by the Juvenile Justice Board to ascertain if the crime was committed as a 'child' or an 'adult'.

== Rehabilitation ==
For the rehabilitation and mainstreaming of the juvenile as mandated by the Juvenile Justice Act, 2000, management committees are set up before the release of juvenile convicts. Accordingly a 'post release plan' for the same is submitted to the court.

== Debates and controversy ==
The discussion required to pass this bill sparked heavy controversy. The decision to make the new age of juveniles as less than 18 was declared a selfish decision by many. The United Nations had stated the international "juvenile" age cutoff to be 18, and many citizens of India felt that following that rule was a reflection of its poor priorities (prioritizing the UN over the needs of its own citizens). A lot of crime in India is committed by those less than the age of 18, and this could potentially let all of them free. Due to this debate, many of the members of the Lok Sabha and Rajya Sabha actually were hesitant to choose 18 as the age boundary, but were complying to UN guidelines. This decision was very important in the debates surrounding the 2015 revision of the act, which then discussed the potential exceptions to this rule given the intensity of a crime.

The Ministry of Women and Child Development started contemplating bringing several desired amendments in 2011 and a process of consultation with various stake holders was initiated. A draft Bill in this regard was prepared and was pending before the Ministry of Law and Justice for scrutiny and put up on the official website of Ministry of Women & Child Development in June 2014 for public inputs. The Delhi gang rape case in December 2012 had tremendous impact on public perception of the Act. One of the convicts was found to be juvenile and sentenced to 3 years in a reform home. Eight writ petitions alleging the Act and its several provisions to be unconstitutional were heard by the Supreme Court of India in the second week of July 2013 and were dismissed, holding the Act to be constitutional. Demands for a reduction of the age of juveniles from 18 to 16 years were also turned down by the Supreme Court, when the Government of India stated that there is no proposal to reduce the age of a juvenile.

In July 2014, Indian Express reported that Pakistan-based terrorist organization Lashkar-e-Taiba had asked its members to declare their age to be below 18 years. This would ensure that they are tried under the Juvenile Justice Act instead of the Indian Penal Code (IPC). The maximum punishment under the Act was three years.

== Notable cases ==
- 2012 Delhi gang rape where the juvenile accused was tried under this law. The case also led to amendments leading to the JJA 2015.

== See also ==
- Juvenile Justice (Care and Protection of Children) Act, 2015
- Victimology
