= Satyamev Jayate season 3 =

Satyamev Jayate
- Season 3
- Starring: Aamir Khan

Release
- Original network: STAR India Network

Season chronology
- ← Previous; Season 2

The third season of the Indian television show Satyamev Jayate premiered on Star Plus. The title of the third season is tagged with Mumkin Hai (It is possible). It was scheduled to be launched on 21 September 2014, but later its start date was postponed to 5 October 2014. Unlike its first and second season, Satyamev Jayate (TV series) (Season 3) had longer episodes and celebrity interactions. The trailers, presented in the show's documentary style, featured real interviews with people who have been affected by the show, on a deeper, personal level.

== Promo ==
The promotional video of Satyamev Jayate (Season 3) showed how a bus conductor deals with a pervert traveling in the bus, staring at a girl. In order to protect the girl, the bus conductor asks him to buy a ticket and informs him about the start of its new season.

== Episodes ==
Episode	Title	Topic	Song	Original Air date
1	Let's Play India	Changing Lives with Sports	"Khelen"	5 October 2014
2	Road Accidents Or Murders?	Road Safety	"Yeh Duaa"	12 October 2014
3	Accepting Alternative Sexualities	Perceptions of alternate sexualities in India	"Maati"	19 October 2014
4	TB - The Ticking Time Bomb	Tuberculosis - Biggest public health problem India facing today		26 October 2014
5	Nurturing Mental Health	Depression - Leading cause of suicide in India	"Dekho Saawan Aayo re"	2 November 2014
6	When Masculinity Harms Men	Deeply entrenched notions of masculinity victimize society	"Mumkin Hai"	8 November 2014
