= Safecity =

Harassment reporting website serving India, Kenya, Cameroon, Nepal, Malaysia

- Headquarters: Red Dot Foundation
- Country of origin: India
- Area served: India, Kenya, Cameroon, Nepal, Malaysia
- Founder: ElsaMarie D’Silva
- CEO: Supreet K Singh
- Products: Safecity CrowdMap, Safecity Data Dashboards, SafeCircle
- Website: www.safecity.in
- Commercial: No
- Registration: Not for Profit in India, CIN U93000MH2014NPL259081, USA 501(c)3 organisation, EIN 82-1206435
- Launched: 2012

Safecity, also known as Safecity.in, is a free website that allows anonymous reporting of incidents of gender-based harassment, abuse, and violence, and creates a map that can be viewed and downloaded by anyone. It is available in India, Kenya, Cameroon, Nepal, and Malaysia.

The website was developed by the Red Dot Foundation after the 2012 Delhi gang rape and murder of Jyoti Singh (also known as Nirbhaya). Safecity has used the data collected to advocate for improvements in public safety measures and to increase public awareness of sexual harassment, abuse, and violence.

== Development ==
After the 2012 Delhi gang rape and murder of Jyoti Singh (also known as Nirbhaya), ElsaMarie D'Silva co-founded Safecity with Surya Velamuri, Aditya Kapoor, and Saloni Malhotra, to track and map incidents of public sexual harassment, abuse, and violence in India. Over the next several years, Safecity grew from mapping Delhi to Mumbai, Pune, Patna and Ahmedabad, and has worked with local communities to organize educational workshops for women and girls.

In 2015, Safecity had collected over 6,000 reports, and began a collaboration with Twitter India to facilitate the sharing of reports from Delhi, Mumbai and Goa by hashtag or direct message.

In 2016, data collected by Safecity showed that public toilets and public transportation were particularly dangerous, including due to poor lighting and maintenance, as well as bystanders failing to take action in response to sexual harassment and violence. Community members used the data from Safecity to advocate for increased public safety measures, including the addition of doors on public toilets. Police have been able to increase patrols and safety issues, such as lighting, have been reviewed. According to D'Silva, the data supports activism, because "You can monitor it, draw trends, and use it in a structured way at a local level, and when people take ownership of their own neighbourhood they feel empowered to take on bigger problems."

In 2017, Safecity data was incorporated into a case study co-authored by D'Silva and published in a special issue of the journal Crime Prevention and Community Safety. As of 2018, Safecity had received over 10,000 reports.

By 2021, Safecity had collected over 25,000 reports. In April 2021, Safecity conducted the #Dhakaldo campaign to encourage bystanders to intervene against street harassment. In 2021, Safecity also partnered with the Bumble dating app, in an initiative called "Stand for Safety" that includes the release of an online safety guide.

== Red Dot Foundation ==
The Safecity website was developed by the Red Dot Foundation, an NGO based in Mumbai. Red Dot Foundation founder and CEO ElsaMarie D'Silva previously had a twenty-year career in the aviation industry, eventually becoming a Vice President of Network Planning at Kingfisher Airlines, but the 2012 Delhi gang rape and murder of Jyoti Singh (also known as Nirbhaya) inspired her to create Safecity and change her career.

In her role as CEO of the Red Dot Foundation, D'Silva has engaged in a variety of public commentary, including on social media, as a co-author of an opinion article for CNN, and providing her expert opinion to The Times of India. D'Silva also contributed an essay titled "Dignity and Gender-Based Violence" to the 2018 Aspen Institute publication Development as Dignity: Frontline Stories from Development Experts in the Global South. In 2021, she participated in a panel on the theme, "Socially just transition towards sustainable development: the role of digital technologies on social development and well-being of all" for the United Nations Commission for Social Development.
