= ICRA =

ICRA may refer to:

- ICRA Limited, an Indian credit ratings agency
- Indian Civil Rights Act of 1968, a United States Act regarding civil rights of American Indians/Native Americans
- International Cultivar Registration Authority, organisation responsible for registering new cultivars of a particular genus
- Internet Content Rating Association, an international non-profit organization
- Irish Civil Rights Association, a United Kingdom political party
- International Conference on Robotics and Automation, an academic conference sponsored by IEEE
- International Center for Relativistic Astrophysics, research organization with headquarters in Rome, Italy
- The Catalan Institute for Water Research
- Infection Control Risk Assessment, a documented process to identify and develop infection prevention within hospitals
