= Nadia nun rape case =

Crime in West Bengal, India

The Nadia nun rape case was a crime in Ranaghat, Nadia district, West Bengal, in March 2015. A 71-year-old Syro-Malankara Catholic nun was gang raped by eight men who robbed a Catholic missionary school. Before the attack, school officials had told police that they had received death threats, but instead of investigating the threats, police recorded them in a book used for minor complaints. Journalist Rana Ayyub blamed the incident on Hindutva groups. Two Bangladeshi nationals were detained on March 20, 2015, on suspicion of their involvement in the sexual assault of the 71-year-old nun at the Ranaghat convent school six days prior, police said. Uttar Dinajpur Superintendent of Police S. W. Reza said that the two suspects — Mukul Alam (28) and Md Majid (29) — bore a striking resemblance to those caught on the CCTV camera at the Convent of Jesus and Mary school on March 14, one of them having 75 percent similarity. Five other men were jailed for 10 years for robbery during the assault and sixth men was handed a seven-year term for harbouring the attackers.

== Reaction ==
Cardinal Baselios Cleemis met the victim in the hospital and told the press that "such inhuman acts should be stopped. We request the authorities to ensure that justice is done and made visible".

== See also ==
- 1997–1999 anti-Christian violence in Gujarat
- Jhabua nuns rape case
