= Pink Revolution in India =

The Pink Revolution in India refers to meat production in India.

== Background ==
During the 2014 Indian general election campaign, Narendra Modi used the term "Pink Revolution" (gulabi kranti) in speeches, accusing the then Congress-led government of promoting the slaughter of animals through meat exports, in contrast to the Green Revolution and White Revolution.

== Buffalo meat exports ==
Indian exports of buffalo meat had been 11.08 lakh tonnes in the period 2012–13, amounting to US$2.3 billion. Uttar Pradesh was the top buffalo meat-producing state with 3 lakh tonne produced in 2011. From 2009 to 2013, India beef exports had risen 44%.

A 2016 report by the rating agency ICRA said that India's buffalo meat exports had grown at a compound annual rate of 29% over the preceding eight years, from ₹3,533 crore in FY08.

According to Commerce Ministry data, India exported 14.8 lakh tonnes of buffalo meat worth US$4.8 billion in 2014–15, about 45% of it to Vietnam. Exports then fell in both value and quantity until 2023–24, and recovered from 2024–25, when they reached US$4.1 billion. In 2025–26 exports rose 25.6% to US$5.1 billion, exceeding US$5 billion for the first time and making buffalo meat India's best-performing agricultural export. APEDA data put the volume at about 14.2 lakh tonnes. Exports in April–June 2026 were nearly US$1.5 billion, up 66.6% from US$896.8 million a year earlier, and a Commerce Ministry official said they were on track to exceed US$6 billion in 2026–27.

In 2025–26, ten countries each imported more than US$100 million of Indian buffalo meat, led by Vietnam (US$933.9 million), Egypt (US$725 million), Malaysia (US$654.1 million), the United Arab Emirates (US$444.2 million) and Saudi Arabia (US$359.3 million). Uzbekistan (US$307 million) has been described as a new emerging market for Indian buffalo meat. According to US Department of Agriculture data, India is the world's third-largest bovine meat exporter, behind Brazil and Australia.

== Regulations ==
Buffalo meat may be exported only from plants registered with APEDA. As of 2026, there were 83 APEDA-approved integrated abattoir-cum-meat processing plants, along with five standalone slaughterhouses and ten meat processing plants registered for export. India does not permit the export of cattle beef and exported buffalo meat comes from animals that no longer produce enough milk, are infertile, or are male. Since 29 October 2025, APEDA has charged a levy of ₹250 per tonne on frozen and chilled buffalo meat exports to fund a Meat Export Development Fund for export promotion.
