= Usha Mehra =

Former judge of the Delhi High Court, in India

Hon'ble Ms. Justice (Retd.) Usha Mehra

Judge of Delhi High Court
- In office 13 July 1990 – 14 November 2003
- Nominated by: Ranganath Misra
- Appointed by: Ramaswamy Venkataraman

Personal details
- Born: 14 November 1941 (age 84)

Usha Mehra (born 14 November 1941) is a former judge of the Delhi High Court, in India. She authored a significant report on lapses in police and judicial procedure in investigating and prosecuting cases of sexual assault in India, following the 2012 Delhi gang-rape and murder.

== Career ==
=== Judicial career ===
Mehra enrolled with the Bar Council of Delhi in 1962, and practiced law in Delhi. She represented the Northern Railway between 1965 and 1980, until her appointment to the judiciary. In 1980, Mehra was appointed as a District and Sessions Judge, and became the Registrar of the Delhi High Court between 1984 and 1987. She was appointed as an additional judge of the Delhi High Court on 13 July 1990, and her appointment was made permanent on 7 November 1990. She retired from judicial service on 14 November 2003.

As a High Court judge, Mehra, along with Judge Pradeep Nandrajog, acquitted S.A.R. Geelani and Afsan Guru of all charges in relation to the 2001 Indian Parliament attack, setting aside the death penalty awarded to Geelani, and confirming it for two other persons convicted in the case. Their order was confirmed by the Indian Supreme Court, and was widely reported. In 2003, Mehra and Nandrajog also issued guidelines for witness protection, which would remain in force until the enactment of a law for witness protection.

=== Commission Report on the 2012 Delhi Gang-Rape and Murder ===
In December 2012, following the 2012 Delhi gang-rape and murder, the Government of India established a Commission of Inquiry to examine lapses in security and safety of women in Delhi, and to make recommendations for improving the same. Mehra was appointed to head this commission. Mehra consulted with a number of civil society groups and student organizations, and with the Delhi Police, and submitted a report for the commission on 22 February 2013. The Commission noted that the Delhi Police had handled the incident negligently, and had failed to co-ordinate adequately with transport authorities. Mehra recommended, amongst other things, that rules of evidence and procedure should be amended to make it easier for survivors of sexual assault to provide testimony; called for more rigorous sentencing for such offences, and also recommended several institutional reforms within the police force, such as increased recruitment of female officers.

The Delhi Police and Delhi Government have since begun implementation of several of the recommendations that Mehra has made in her report. In August 2013, the Delhi Police announced that they had expanded recruitment for women in the force, following Mehra's recommendations. In 2014, the Ministry for Women and Child Development announced that their intention to establish special one-stop centers for the reporting of crimes against women, in all districts, following Mehra's recommendation for such centers. In 2014, Mehra criticized the Delhi Government and Police for failing to implement most of her recommendations. In 2015, the Delhi Police confirmed that they had commissioned a study on the psychology of offences committed against women, which was also recommended by Mehra, in order to help with better policing and investigation of sexual assault cases.

=== Law Commission of India ===
In 2013, Mehra was appointed as a member of the Law Commission of India. During her tenure at the Law Commission, the Commission presented a report calling for the abolition of the death penalty, except in terror cases. Mehra disagreed with the commission, including a note of dissent in the report, stating that she felt that the death penalty should be retained, "...keeping in view the circumstances prevailing in our country."

=== Other appointments ===
In 2005, Mehra was appointed by the Delhi High Court to supervise the Delhi Development Authority's implementation of orders to remove illegal establishments built on the riverbed and floodplain of the Yamuna river.

In 2007, Mehra was appointed to head a commission to inquire into the categorisation of sub-castes, for the purpose of affirmative action. Mehra's report stated that castes could not be seen as a homogeneous group, and recommended categorisation of castes to improve affirmative action policies. The Report received wide public attention.

In 2011, Mehra was appointed as a member of the Indian Court of Arbitration for Sports (ICAS), a dispute resolution body established by the Indian Olympic Associationto address sports-related disputes.
