= Nirbhaya Fund =

Fund to support female victims in India

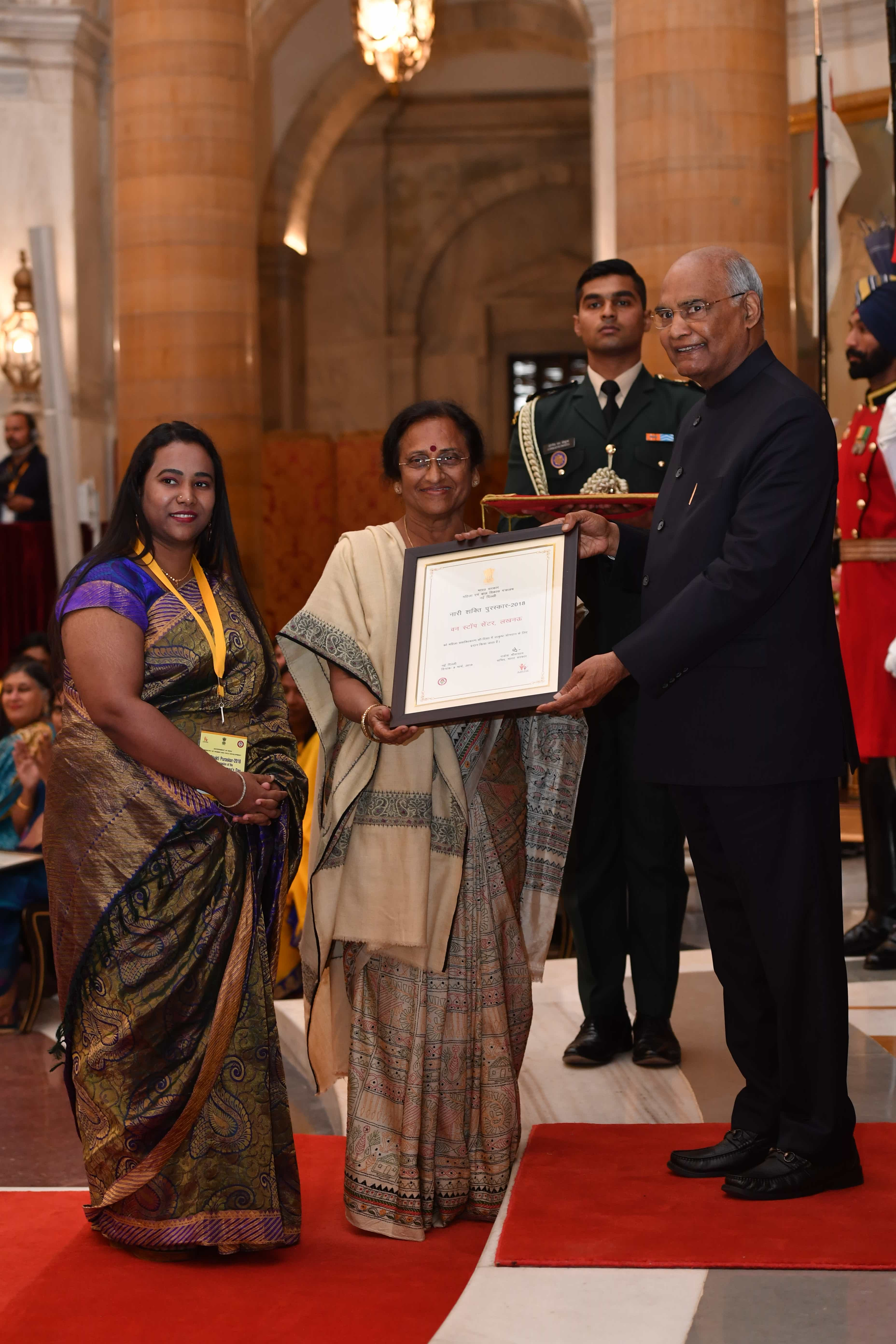
The One Stop Centre in Lucknow (funded by Nirbhaya) gained an award on International Women's Day 2019

Nirbhaya Fund was a ₹1000 crore corpus announced by Government of India in its 2013 Union Budget, in the aftermath of the 2012 Delhi gang rape. The Finance Minister P. Chidambaram announced the fund to support initiatives protecting the dignity and ensuring safety of women in India. Nirbhaya (transl. fearless) was the pseudonym given to the 2012 Delhi gang rape victim. The Ministry of Women and Child Development and several other ministries decided the application of the fund. One of its uses was to open One Stop Centers to support women who are victims of violence.

== History ==
Nirbhaya Fund was announced by the Finance Minister in his 2013 budget speech, with Government contribution of Rs. 1000 crores for empowerment, safety and security of women and girl children. The fund is administered by Department of Economic Affairs of the finance ministry.

== Use of funds ==
Various ministries proposed projects to use this fund to enhance the safety and security of women. Some of the ministries which submitted proposals were the Ministry of Information Technology, the Ministry of Road Transport and Highways, Ministry of Railways and Ministry of Home Affairs. The Ministry of Home Affairs (MHA) approved a Safe City project for Lucknow at a total cost of Rs. 194.44 crore under the Nirbhaya Fund Scheme.

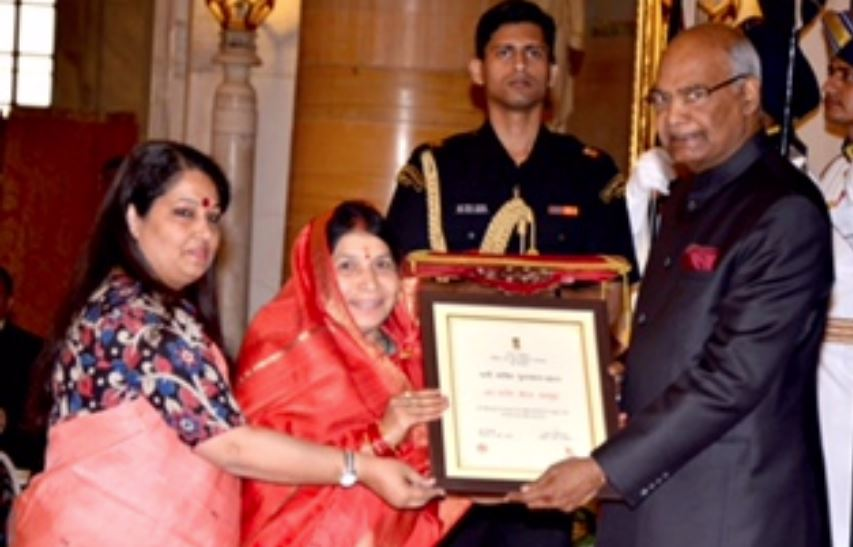
The One Stop Centre in Raipur was awarded the Nari Shakti Puraskar for 2017

In November 2013, the Ministry of Urban Development asked states to propose and implement new plans that can be financed through the Nirbhaya Fund. The ministry has also notified States and Union Territories who would not get their quotas of new buses under the Jawaharlal Nehru National Urban Renewal Mission if they fail to put in place steps to make public transport system safe for women.

The fund was used to create "One Step Centres" or "Sakhi" across the country where women who were victim's of violence could find support. The One Stop Centres were initially set up with one proposed for every Indian state after a recommendation in 2013. The One Stop Centre in Raipur and the one in Lucknow (both funded by Nirbhaya) gained Nari Shakti Puraskar awards on International Women's Day in 2018 and 2019 respectively for their work in empowering women.

== Criticism ==
The government was criticized for not using the fund effectively, with long delays and inadequate implementation of projects.

The One Stop Center scheme, initially under the ‘Mission for Protection and Empowerment for Women’, was subsumed with other schemes, under a new programme, ‘Sambal’ of ‘Mission Shakti’. Of the total allocated amount of Rs 587 crore for Sambal in 2021–22, Rs 183 crore, or roughly around 31%, has been used in that particular year. As a result, the allocation for the scheme was reduced to Rs 562 crore in subsequent years.
