= Juvenile Justice (Care and Protection of Children) Act, 2015 =

Act of the Parliament of India

Parliament of India
- Long title: An Act to consolidate and amend the law relating to children alleged and found to be in conflict with law and children in need of care and protection by catering to their basic needs through proper care, protection, development, treatment, social re-integration, by adopting a child-friendly approach in the adjudication and disposal of matters in the best interest of children and for their rehabilitation through processes provided, and institutions and bodies established, hereinunder and for matters connected therewith or incidental thereto.
- Citation: No 2 of 2016
- Territorial extent: India
- Enacted by: Parliament of India
- Enacted: 7 May 2015 (Lok Sabha); 22 December 2015 (Rajya Sabha
- Assented to: 31 December 2015
- Commenced: = 15 January 2016

Legislative history
- Bill title: The Juvenile Justice (Care and Protection of Children) Bill, 2015
- Bill citation: Bill No 99-C of 2014
- Introduced by: Maneka Gandhi, Minister of Women and Child Development
- Introduced: 12 August 2014
- First reading: Rh
- Second reading: Dh
- Third reading: Fh
- Committee report: Standing Committee Report

Repeals
- Juvenile Justice (Care and Protection of Children) Act, 2000

Amended by
- Juvenile Justice (Care and Protection of Children) Amendment Act, 2021
- Status: In force (amended)

The Juvenile Justice (Care and Protection of Children) Act, 2015 has been passed by Parliament of India amidst intense controversy, debate, and protest over many of its provisions by the child rights fraternity. It replaced the Indian juvenile delinquency law, Juvenile Justice (Care and Protection of Children) Act, 2000, and allows for juveniles in conflict with law in the age group of 16–18, involved in heinous offences, to be tried as adults. The Act also sought to create a universally accessible adoption law for India, overtaking the Hindu Adoptions and Maintenance Act (1956) (applicable to Hindus, Buddhists, Jains, and Sikhs) and the Guardians and Wards Act (1890) (applicable to Muslims), though not replacing them. The Act came into force from 15 January 2016.

It was passed on 7 May 2015 by the Lok Sabha amid intense protest by several Members of Parliament. It was passed on 22 December 2015 by the Rajya Sabha.

To streamline adoption procedures for orphan, abandoned and surrendered children, the existing Central Adoption Resource Authority (CARA) has been given the status of a statutory body to enable it to perform its function more effectively. A separate chapter on Adoption provides detailed provisions relating to adoption and punishments for non compliance. Processes have been streamlined with timelines for both in-country and inter-country adoption including declaring a child legally free for adoption.

This Act has further been amended by the Juvenile Justice (Care and Protection of Children) Amendment Act, 2021 which have come into force from 1 September 2022.

== History ==
The Ministry of Women and Child Development began contemplating several desired amendments in 2011 and a process of consultation with various stake holders was initiated. The Delhi gang rape case in December 2012 had tremendous impact on public perception of the Act. One of the accused in the 2012 Delhi gang rape was a few months younger than 18 years of age and under the Act was tried in a juvenile court. Eight writ petitions alleging the Act and its several provisions to be unconstitutional were heard by the Supreme Court of India, prompting the juvenile court to delay its verdict. In the second week of July 2013, the Supreme Court dismissed the objections, holding the Act to be constitutional. Demands for a reduction of the age of adults from 18 to 16 years were also turned down by the Supreme Court, when the government of India stated that there is no proposal to reduce the age of an adult. On 31 August 2013, the case returned to the juvenile court and a sentence of 3 years in a reform home was handed down. The victim's mother criticized the verdict and said that by not punishing the juvenile the court was encouraging other teenagers to commit similar crimes.

In July 2014, Minister of Women and Child Development, Maneka Gandhi said that they were preparing a new law which will allow 16-year-olds to be tried as adults. She said that 50% of juvenile crimes were committed by teens deliberately, but they thought that they could get away with it. She added that changing the law, which will allow them to be tried for murder and rape as adults, would scare them. The bill was introduced in the Parliament by Maneka Gandhi on 12 August 2014. On 22 April 2015, the Cabinet cleared the final version after some changes.

A revamped Juvenile Justice Bill was passed in the Lok Sabha on 7 May 2015. The new bill will allow minors in the age group of 16-18 to be tried as adults if they commit heinous crimes. The heinous crime will be examined by the Juvenile Justice Board to ascertain if the crime was committed as a 'child' or an 'adult'.

== Summary ==
The bill will allow a Juvenile Justice Board (JJB), which would include psychologists and social workers, to decide whether a juvenile criminal in the age group of 16-18 should be treated as an adult or not. The bill introduced concepts from the Hague Convention on Protection of Children and Cooperation in Respect of Inter-Country Adoption, 1993 which were missing in the previous act. The bill also seeks to make the adoption process of orphaned, abandoned and surrendered children more streamlined. Appeals against JJB's order can be made to the Children's Court. Subsequently, orders of the Children's court can be appealed in the High Court.

The bill introduces foster care in India. Families will sign up for foster care and abandoned, orphaned children, or those in conflict with the law will be sent to them. Such families will be monitored and shall receive financial aid from the state. In adoption, disabled children and children who are physically and financially incapable will be given priority. Parents giving up their child for adoption will get 3 months to reconsider, compared to the earlier provision of 1 month.

A person giving alcohol or drugs to a child shall be punished with 7 years imprisonment and/or ₹1,00,000 fine. Corporal punishment will be punishable by ₹50,000 or 3 years of imprisonment. A person selling a child will be fined with ₹1,00,000 and imprisoned for 5 years.

One of the most criticized step in the new Juvenile Justice Bill 2015 is introduction of "Judicial Waiver System" which allows treatment of juveniles, in certain conditions, in the adult criminal justice system and to punish them as adults. This is for the first time in India's history that such a provision has been prescribed. Given to the severe criticism, Bill was referred to a Standing Committee of Parliament which also rejected such provisions. Since recommendations of Parliament's Standing Committee are not binding, Government has moved ahead and introduced the Bill in Lok Sabha, where it stands passed.

The bill is also criticized for prescribing an opaque Age Determination System and its poor draft. There are numerous drafting errors which have been coming to notice after the Bill has been rolled out for implementation on 15 January 2016. The government is working on an amendment to sure such errors.

The bill now stands Passed in Rajya-Sabha on Tuesday 22 December 2015, after the Nirbhaya case accused juvenile was released.

== 2021 amendments ==
As of July 2018, there were 629 adoption cases pending in various courts. In order to expedite adoption proceedings, the new amendment transfers the power to issue adoption orders to the district magistrate.

In 2021, The Juvenile Justice (Care and Protection of Children) Amendment Act, 2021 was passed by the Parliament of India. The previous provisions state that adoption of a child is final on the issuance of an adoption order by the civil court. The new amendment provides that instead of the court, the district magistrate shall issue such adoption orders.

As per the 2015 Act, offences committed by juveniles are categorised as heinous offences, serious offences and petty offences. Serious offences include offences with three to seven years of imprisonment. The new amendment adds that serious offences will also include non-heinous offences for which maximum punishment is imprisonment of more than seven years and minimum punishment is not prescribed or is less than seven years.

== Criticism ==
During the debate in the Lok Sabha in May 2015, Shashi Tharoor, an INC Member the Parliament (MP), argued that the law was in contradiction with international standards and that most children who break the law come from poor and illiterate families. He said that they should be educated instead of being punished.

Child Rights Activists and Women Rights Activists have called the bill a regressive step and have criticized the Bill. Many experts and activists viewed post December 2012 Delhi Gang Rape responses as creation of media sensationalisation of the issue, and cautioned against any regressive move to disturb the momentum of Juvenile Justice Legislation in the Country. However some sections in the society felt that in view of terrorism and other serious offences, the Juvenile Justice Act of 2000 needed to be amended to include punitive approaches in the existing Juvenile Justice Law, which so far is purely rehabilitative and reformative. Some argued that there is no need of tampering with Juvenile Justice Act for putting up effective deterrent against terrorism. Retired Judge of Delhi High Court, Justice RS Sodhi on 8 August 2015 told Hindustan Times, "We are a civilised nation and if we become barbaric by twisting our own laws, then the enemy will succeed in destroying our social structure. We should not allow that but we must condemn this move of sending children to fight their war".

The Bill has been criticized for insufficient provisions on minors involved in underage driving, especially if it results in accidents and bodily harm, although the Motor Vehicles Act, amended in 2019, holds parents, guardians, and vehicle owners criminally liable for minors driving. According to the Supreme Court, the makers and framers of the law committed a serious mistake to allow juveniles to evade being treated as adults in such cases of hit-and-run, leading to homicide not amounting to murder. As a result of this, the Juvenile Justice Board has been criticized for rejecting petitions from families of victims and law enforcement to try minors as adults for involvement in hit-and-run cases which resulted in deaths, as well as granting bail to the culprits on frivolous grounds.

== See also ==
- 2012 Delhi gang rape and murder, a rape case where one of the convicts was a juvenile
- 2024 Pune Porsche car crash, where the driver was a minor
- Odisha State Child Protection Society
- Bangladesh Children Act
