= Priyadarshini Mattoo =

Murdered law student in New Delhi

- Born: 23 July 1970; Srinagar, Jammu and Kashmir, India
- Died: 23 January 1996 (aged 25); New Delhi, India
- Occupation: Student

Priyadarshini Mattoo (23 July 1970 – 23 January 1996) was a 25-year-old law student who was found raped and murdered at her house in New Delhi on 23 January 1996. On 17 October 2006, the Delhi High Court found Santosh Kumar Singh guilty on both counts of rape and murder, and on 30 October of the same year sentenced him to death. On 6 October 2010, the Supreme Court of India commuted the death sentence to life imprisonment. Santosh Kumar Singh, the son of an Inspector-General of Police, had earlier been acquitted by a trial court in 1999, and the High Court decision was widely perceived in India as a landmark reversal. This decision was overturned as the facts were not presented correctly in the lower court.

== Significance of the case ==
The acquittal of Santosh Singh in 1999 led to the investigating agency CBI, challenge the judgment in the Delhi high court on 29 February 2000.

Justices RS Sodhi and PK Bhasin of Delhi High Court shifted from a traditional lax pace, with hearings every few months, to a day-to-day trial, and judgment was reached in 42 days. The original acquittal was overturned and Santosh Singh was found guilty of murder and rape.

The case is one of several in India that highlight the ineffectiveness of the traditional criminal law system, especially when it comes to high-profile perpetrators, including the Murder of Jessica Lall and Sanjeev Nanda acquittals.

== Childhood ==
Priyadarshini was a Kashmiri Pandit. She was raised in Srinagar. After Priyadarshini finished school at the Presentation Convent School in Srinagar, she migrated with her family to Jammu due to increasing Militancy in Kashmir. Priyadarshini received her BCom while in Jammu from MAM College, before being accepted to Delhi University to earn an LLB degree. It was during her time as a student in Delhi that Santosh Singh became besotted with her, and made indecent proposals. However, at one point, he started stalking her, and her family lodged several FIRs with the police. A police escort was provided for some time, but the stalking continued.

== The murder ==
Priyadarshini was in the third year of her law program when she was found strangled in her uncle’s residence. She had been raped, struck 14 times with a motorcycle helmet, and finally strangled with a wire. Santosh Kumar Singh, her senior in college, had been stalking and harassing her for several years, and was the immediate suspect. But Santosh came from an influential family - his father J.P. Singh was then Inspector General of Police in Pondicherry - in the course of the trial, he served as Joint Commissioner of Police in Delhi, where the crime had been committed. In view of these connections, the court handed over the investigation of the case to the Central Bureau of Investigation (CBI). In 1995, Priyadarshini had complained that Santosh Singh was harassing and stalking her. She had been provided with a personal security officer at the time. In retaliation, Santosh had lodged a complaint with the university alleging that she was pursuing two degrees simultaneously. However, it turned out that Priyadarshini had passed M.Com in 1991 and the complaint was merely malicious. On the morning of 23 January 1996, Santosh was seen knocking for entrance into Priyadarshini's uncle's house, where she was living, in the Vasant Kunj area of Delhi. A servant saw Santosh entering her house, apparently saying that he wanted a compromise in their legal complaints. Subsequently, he raped her, strangled her with an electric wire, and then battered her face beyond recognition with his motorcycle helmet. Santosh's presence in the house after the murder was also established by the prosecution.

== Trial Court judgment ==
Delivering the ironical and widely criticized judgment in the trial court proceedings in 1999, the Additional Sessions Judge. G.P. Thareja said of Santosh, that though he knew that "he is the man who committed the crime," he was forced to acquit him, giving him the benefit of doubt.

In a 450-page judgment the judge came down heavily on the role of Delhi Police; "There has been particular inaction by Delhi Police", he said, while commenting that the accused’s father may have used his official position to influence the agencies. "The influence of the father has been there in the matter and there was deliberate inaction" (at the time his father was second in command of the police forces in Delhi).

The helmet was found with a shattered visor - however, the evidence was so poorly presented that the defense was able to discount it.

He further stated that the rule of law doesn’t seem to apply to the children of those who enforce it.

The Delhi police according to the judge, attempted to assist the accused during the investigation and trial. "Lalit Mohan, the Inspector was instrumental in creating false evidence and false defense for the accused. The witnesses of the police including a Sub-Inspector deposed falsely".

The judgment held the CBI responsible for unfair investigation and failure to produce Virender Prasad, Mattoo’s household help, which resulted in the obstruction of justice. The police had claimed Prasad had gone missing and was not traceable, yet in the aftermath, a journalist could easily find him in his Bihar village.

The judge added that the CBI fabricated the DNA test in the rape case as it was not obtained in accordance with the judicial procedure and could not, therefore, be admitted in evidence in view of Section 45 of the Indian Evidence Act.

The "state had failed to bring home the charge of rape against the accused", and while indicting Santosh as "the man who committed the crime", the judge was constrained to acquit him, because of "the benefit of the doubt".

== High Court appeal ==
Following a public outcry, the CBI then appealed the district court's verdict in Delhi High Court on 29 February 2000. Initially, the trial was not a priority, and there was no presentation of evidence or hearings in the Delhi High Court well into 2006. However, intense public scrutiny was mounted in the case after the acquittals in the Jessica Lal case, with Priyadarshini's aged father Chaman Lal Mattoo making frequent appearances on TV, bringing the judiciary under intense pressure.

On 31 August 2006, six years after the initial appeal by CBI, justices RS Sodhi and PK Bhasin took up the case on a day-to-day hearing basis, which is extremely rare in India. Judgment was reached within 42 days which is quite unprecedented.

=== Verdict ===
On 17 October 2006, Santosh Singh, who meanwhile had married and become a practicing lawyer in Delhi itself, was found guilty under Indian Penal Code sections 302 (murder) and 376 (rape). The verdict blames G.P. Thareja's original judgment:

The trial judge acquitted the accused amazingly taking a perverse approach. It murdered justice and shocked the judicial conscience.

In particular, the verdict held that there were no lacunae in the DNA testing and that the combination of the forensic and circumstantial evidence was clinching. However, the bench agreed with the trial's court observation that police were reluctant to act on repeated complaints of harassment and stalking against Singh as his father was the senior IPS officer (now retired) Director-General of Police J.P. Singh.

The verdict says "junior staff do not react to complaints against the relatives of their fraternity" and referred to the trial court's observation that the approach and working of the subordinate staff of Delhi Police clearly reflected that the rule of law "is not meant for those who enforce the law nor for their near relatives".

The verdict was reached on the basis of strong circumstantial evidence. Santosh's father J.P. Singh was in court. Priyadarshini's father expressed satisfaction that justice had been achieved ten years after the gruesome murder.

=== Death penalty ===
As recommended by the Central Bureau of Investigation the death penalty was awarded to Santosh Singh on 30 October 2006.

Pronouncing its verdict, the court said the mitigating circumstances under which leniency was begged for Santosh was not enough and the brutal rape and murder do fall in the bracket of "rarest of rare" cases. Santosh was sitting just five feet away from the jam-packed court. The court had convicted Santosh of the crime earlier that month.

The two-judge bench, comprising Justice R. S. Sodhi and Justice P. K. Bhasin, heard both sides before pronouncing the verdict. The court said Santosh Singh had been given many chances to reform by the police when Priyadarshini had complained that he was stalking her. However, he didn't mend his ways and eventually raped and killed her.

"There is absolutely no doubt in our mind that what was required of Singh was exemplary behavior being a son of a police officer and a lawyer himself. Yet with a pre-meditated approach, he continued to harass the victim for two years," the Bench said.

"In spite of repeated warnings by the police and his undertakings to them, he went about committing the most ghastly act. The act itself sent ripples in society and showed how insecure a citizen can get against this kind of a person," the bench remarked.

== Supreme Court appeal ==
Santosh Singh appealed against the death penalty sentence to the Supreme Court of India on 19 February 2006 . The court also issued a notice to the Central Bureau of Investigation on an appeal filed by the convict against the high court's judgment. The defense lawyers of the accused Santosh Singh questioned the validity of the DNA report, one of the main causes for which he was given the benefit of doubt in the Trial court. Further the issue of Trial by Media is likely to be raised and whether excessive media coverage has influenced the verdict.

In October 2010, the Supreme Court upheld the conviction of Santosh Kumar Singh but reduced the death sentence to life imprisonment. Priyadarshini's father expressed disappointment with the CBI for failing to appeal against this decision.

== Post-conviction ==
Santosh Singh, post-conviction, spent 4 years behind bars and was out on parole in March 2011. Upon return, he subsequently filed another application for grant of parole (subject matter of Criminal Writ Petition 224/2012) before Delhi High Court. The High Court granted him parole for another month on 6 March 2012.
