= Kannada cinema =

- No. of screens: 925 (as of 2022) including: 630 single screens (as of 2021–22), 260 multiplex screens (as of 2021)
  - Per capita: 1.3 per 100,000
- Main distributors: Mahatma Pictures; Sri Vajreshwari Combines; Sri Eswari Combines; KCN Movies; Rockline Entertainments; Jayanna Combines; Thoogudeepa Distributors; PRK Productions; Paramvah Studios; Hombale Films; Pushkar Films; KRG Studios; Mars Distributors

Produced feature films (2019)
- Total: 336

Kannada cinema, also known as Sandalwood, or Chandanavana, is the segment of Indian cinema dedicated to the production of motion pictures in the Kannada language, widely spoken in the state of Karnataka. Kannada cinema is based in Gandhi Nagar, Bengaluru. The 1934 film Sati Sulochana directed by Y. V. Rao was the first talkie film released in the Kannada language. It was also the first film starring Subbaiah Naidu and Tripuramba, and the first screened in the erstwhile Mysore Kingdom. It was produced by Chamanlal Doongaji, who in 1932 founded South India Movietone in Bengaluru.

Major literary works have been adapted to the Kannada screen, such as B. V. Karanth's Chomana Dudi (1975), (based on Chomana Dudi by Shivaram Karanth), Girish Karnad's Kaadu (1973), (based on Kaadu by Srikrishna Alanahalli), Pattabhirama Reddy's Samskara (1970) (based on Samskara by U. R. Ananthamurthy), which won the Bronze Leopard at Locarno International Film Festival, and T. S. Nagabharana's Mysuru Mallige (1992), based on the works of poet K. S. Narasimhaswamy.

Kannada cinema is known for producing experimental works such as Girish Kasaravalli's Ghatashraddha (1977), which won the Ducats Award at the Manneham Film Festival Germany, Dweepa (2002), which won Best Film at Moscow International Film Festival, Singeetam Srinivasa Rao's silent film Pushpaka Vimana (1987), Ram Gopal Varma's docudrama Killing Veerappan (2016), Prashanth Neel's action franchise K. G. F. film series being the highest-grossing Kannada film, and Rishab Shetty's Kantara (2022).

Kannada cinema is reported to have 8% market share in the gross domestic box office collections for the period January to August 2022, making it the fourth-biggest Indian film industry. The share rose to 9% by October 2022. The total gross collections of the top five Kannada movies of 2022 in first ten months was reported to be ₹1800 crores. The year 2022 began new era for the industry in terms of popularity, quality content and collections. However, the market share of Kannada movies in the gross domestic box office collections declined to 2% in 2023 with the footfalls dropping from 8.1 crores in 2022 to 3.2 crores in 2023. Critics have called it as one of India’s most unpredictable film industries.

== History ==
=== Early history ===
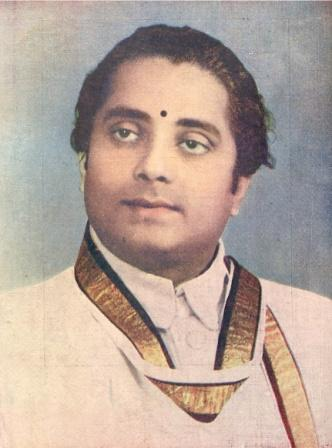
Kannada film doyen Honnappa Bhagavathar

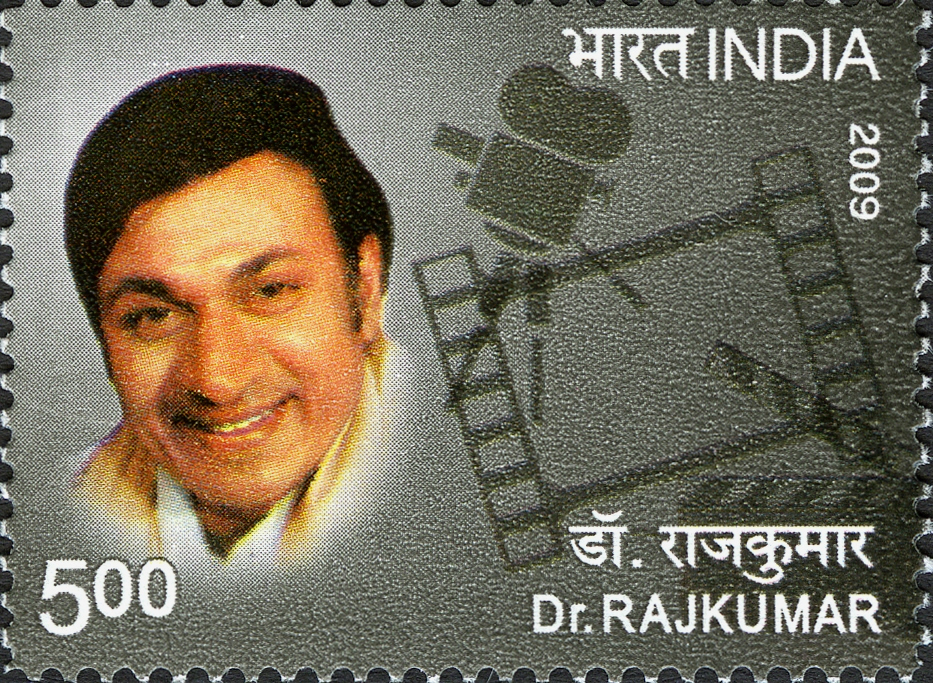
Rajkumar on a 2009 stamp in India

In 1934, the first Kannada talkie, Sati Sulochana, appeared in theatres, followed by Bhakta Dhruva (aka Dhruva Kumar). Sati Sulochana, starring Subbaiah Naidu and Tripuramba, was shot in Kolhapur at the Chatrapathi studio; most filming, sound recording, and post-production was done in Chennai.

In 1949, Honnappa Bhagavathar, who had earlier acted in Gubbi Veeranna's films, produced Bhakta Kumbara and starred in the lead role along with Pandaribai. In 1955, Bhagavathar again produced a Kannada film, Mahakavi Kalidasa, in which he introduced actress B. Saroja Devi. B. S. Ranga was an Indian photographer, actor, writer, producer and director made many landmark movies in Kannada, under Vikram Studios.

=== Mainstream ===
Matinee idol, Rajkumar entered Kannada cinema after his long stint as a dramatist with Gubbi Veeranna's Gubbi Drama Company, which he joined at the age of eight, before he got his first break as a lead in the 1954 film Bedara Kannappa.

He went on to essay a variety of roles and excelling in portraying mythological and historical characters in films such as Bhakta Kanakadasa (1960), Ranadheera Kanteerava (1960), Satya Harishchandra (1965), Immadi Pulikeshi (1967), Sri Krishnadevaraya (1970), Bhakta Kumbara (1974), Mayura (1975), Babruvahana (1977) and Bhakta Prahlada (1983). His wife Parvathamma Rajkumar founded Film production and distribution company, Sri Vajreshwari Combines.

Vishnuvardhan entered Kannada cinema with the National Award-winning movie Vamsha Vriksha (1972) directed by Girish Karnad based on the novel written by S. L. Bhyrappa. His first lead role was in Naagarahaavu, directed by Puttanna Kanagal and based on a novel by T. R. Subba Rao. It was the first in Kannada film history to complete 100 days in three main theatres of Bangalore. In his 37-year career, he has played a variety of roles in more than 200 films.

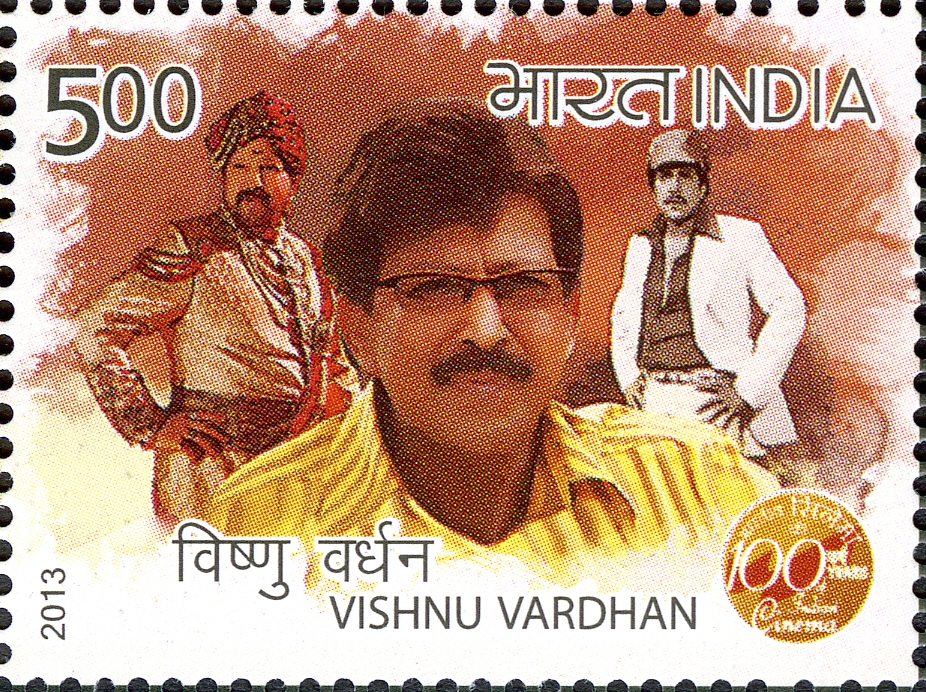
Vishnuvardhan on 2013 Indian stamp

With his debut in Puttanna Kanagal's National Award-winning Kannada film Naagarahaavu (1972), Ambareesh's acting career commenced with a brief phase of portraying antagonistic and supporting characters. After establishing himself as a lead actor portraying rebellious characters on screen in a number of commercially successful films, he earned the moniker "rebel star". He also earned the nickname Mandyada Gandu (transl. Man of Mandya)

Rajkumar, Vishnuvardhan and Ambareesh are collectively known as Kannada cinema's triumvirate.

Method actor Shankar Nag received the inaugural IFFI Best Actor Award (Male): Silver Peacock Award" at the 7th International Film Festival of India for his work in the film Ondanondu Kaladalli. He is the younger brother of actor Anant Nag. M. V. Vasudeva Rao, the first Kannada actor to win National Film Award for Best Actor, was starred in over 200 films in his career; however, post Chomana Dudi, he only played minor roles.

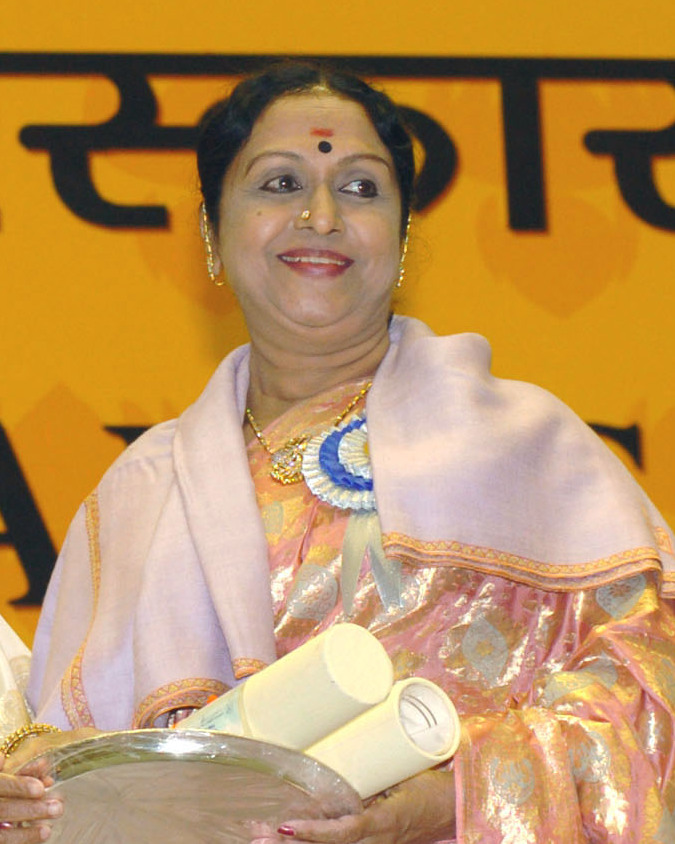
Actress B. Saroja Devi

B. Saroja Devi is one of the most successful female leads in the history of Indian cinema and has acted in around 200 films in over seven decades. She is known by the epithets "Abinaya Saraswathi" (Saraswati of acting) in Kannada and "Kannadathu Paingili" (Kannada's Parrot) in Tamil.

M. V. Rajamma (first female producer of Indian cinema) and Pandari Bai are considered as the earliest female superstars of Kannada cinema. Other popular female actresses of 1950s through 1990s include Prathima Devi, Harini, Sowcar Janaki, Leelavathi, Kanchana, Jayanthi, Kalpana, Bharathi, Lakshmi, Aarathi, Manjula, Sumithra, Jayamala, Hema Chaudhary, Arundathi, Sumalatha, Maadhavi, Suhasini, Geetha, Saritha, Urvashi, Umashree, Bhavya, Vinaya Prasad, Sudharani, Tara, Malashree, Shruthi, Soundarya, Prema among others.

=== Neo-realistic cinema ===
Kannada cinema contributed majorly to the parallel cinema movement of India. Directors like Girish Kasaravalli, Girish Karnad, and G. V. Iyer were the early names to join the movement. T. S. Nagabharana and B. V. Karanth were also popular names in the movement. Films of Puttanna Kanagal were however considered a bridge between mainstream and parallel cinema.

=== Modern era ===
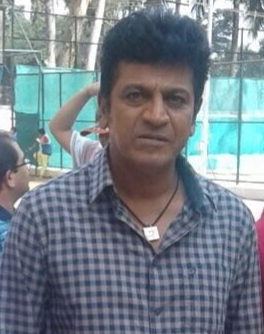
Shiva Rajkumar

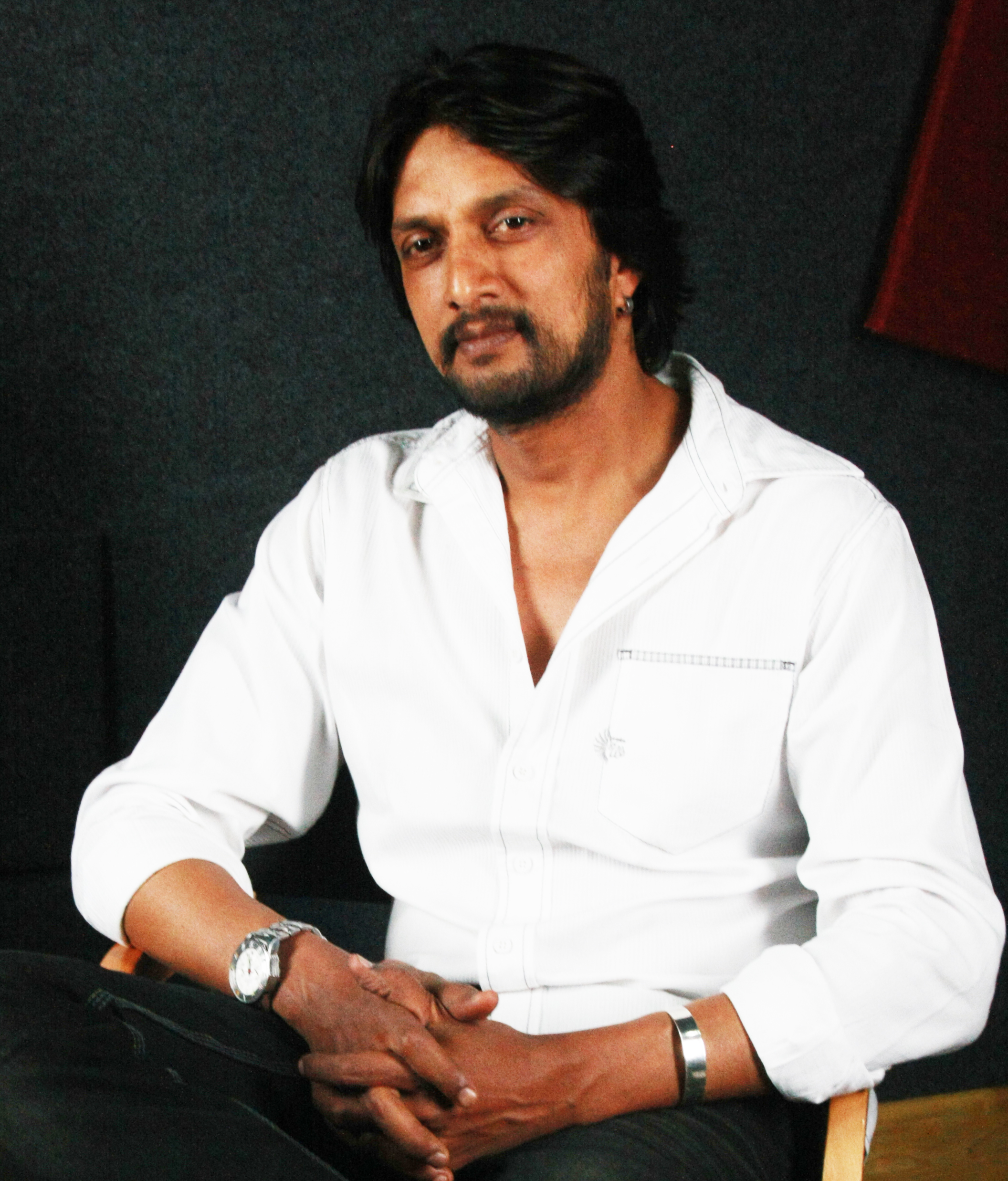
Sudeepa

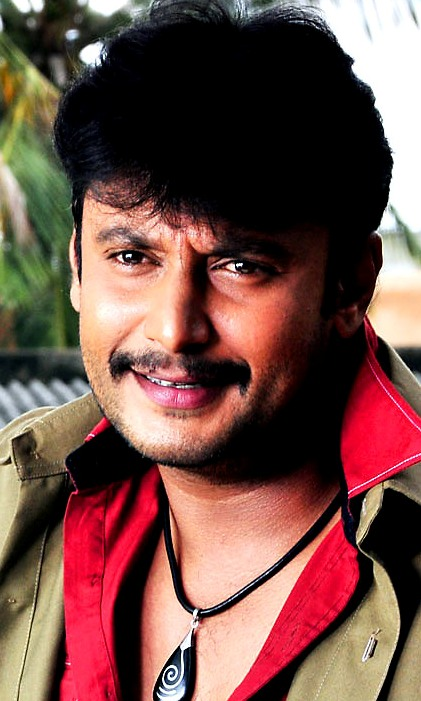
Darshan

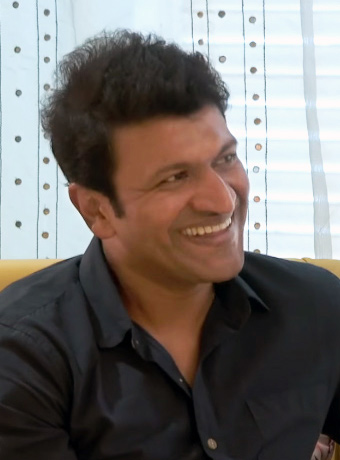
Puneeth Rajkumar

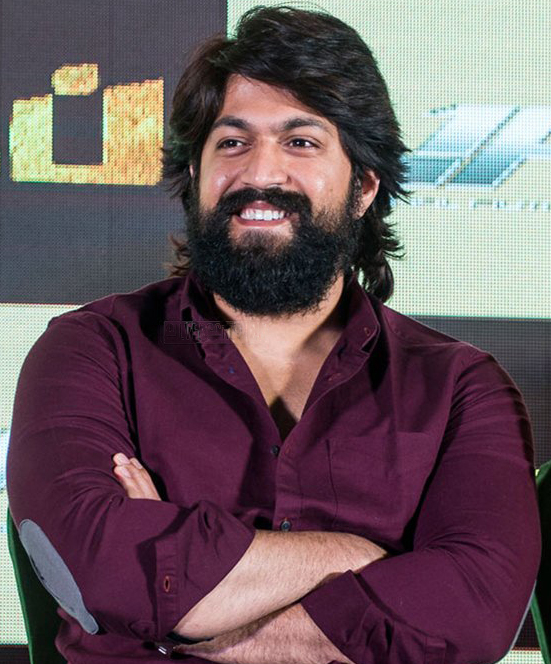
Yash

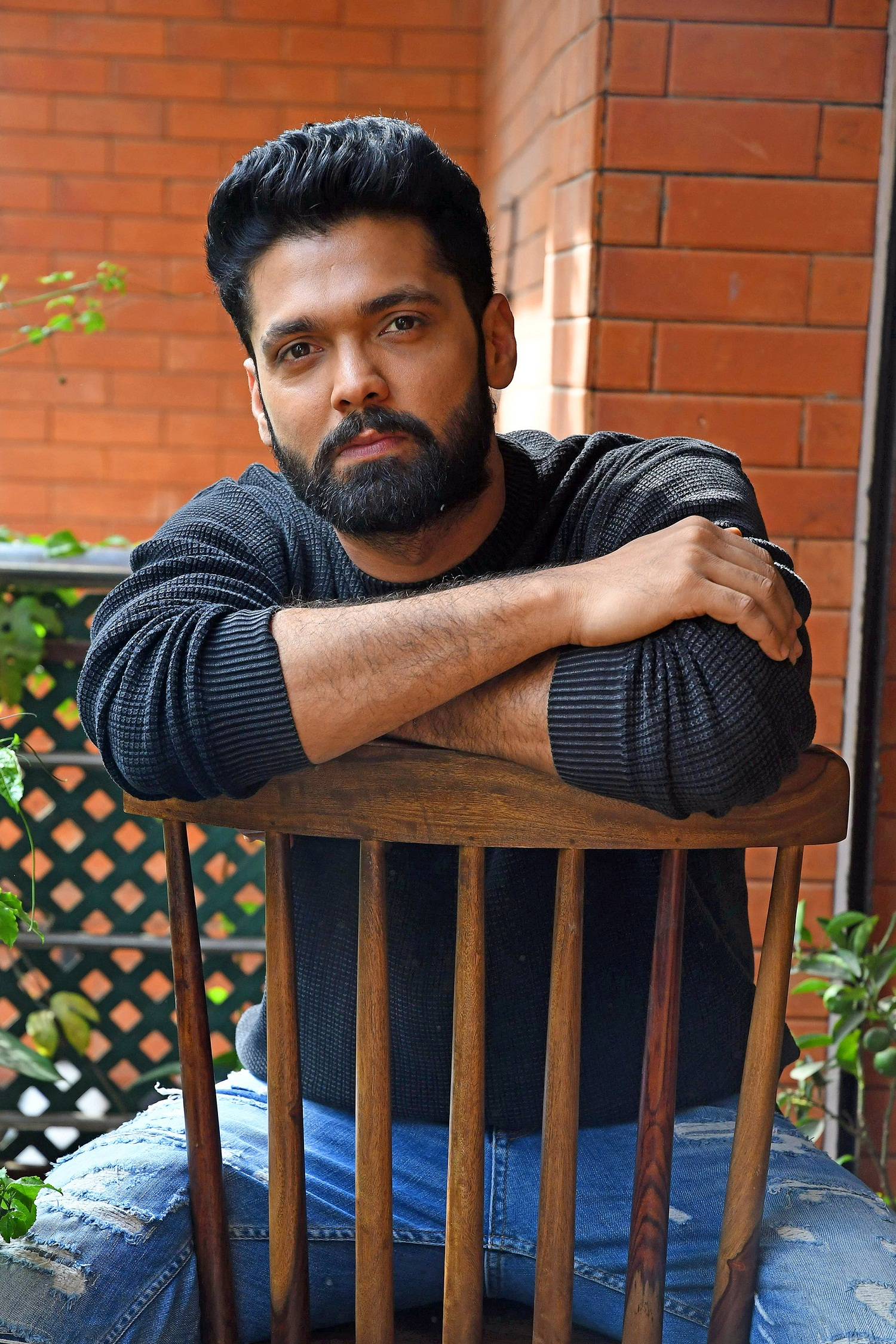
Rakshit Shetty

Prominent actors of the contemporary Kannada cinema

Prakash Raj began his acting career with Doordarshan serials such as Bisilu Kudure (Kannada) and Guddada Bhootha (Tulu and Kannada). He later took up supporting roles in Kannada films such as Ramachari, Ranadheera, Nishkarsha, and Lockup Death. He was known for his dialogue delivery and histrionics. His breakthrough role came in Harakeya Kuri, directed by K. S. L. Swamy starring Vishnuvardhan, with whom he had acted in other films such as Mithileya Seetheyaru, Muthina Haara and Nishkarsha. Prakash re-entered Kannada films through Nagamandala in 1997, directed by T. S. Nagabharana. Veteran Kannada actor Shakti Prasad's son Arjun Sarja is known for his work in South Indian cinema. He starred in movies such as Prasad (2012), which was screened at the Berlin Film Festival and Arjun received the Karnataka State Award for his performance in it.

Sanchari Vijay's portrayal of a transgender won him the National Best Actor Award. With the award, Vijay became the third actor after M. V. Vasudeva Rao, and Charuhasan to win the National Award for Best Actor for a performance in a Kannada film.

Shiva Rajkumar is known for his work in Janumada Jodi, Anand, Ratha Sapthami, Nammoora Mandara Hoove, Om, Simhada Mari and Chigurida Kanasu. He acted in Sugreeva, which was shot in 18 hours. His Om, directed by Upendra, set a trend of gangster movies in Kannada and other film industries in India. It continues to be shown even to this day.

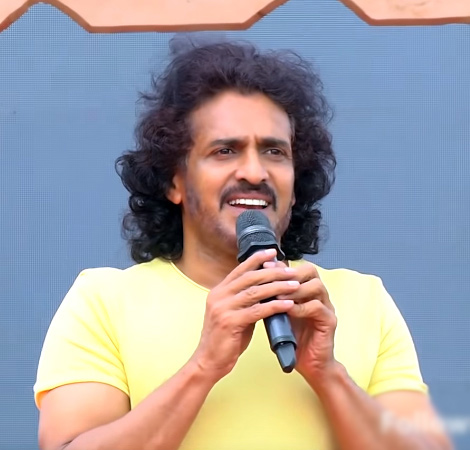
Upendra

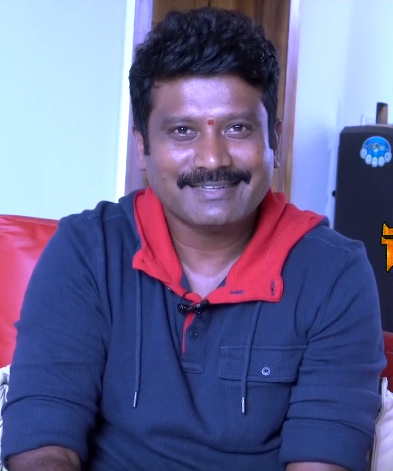
Prem

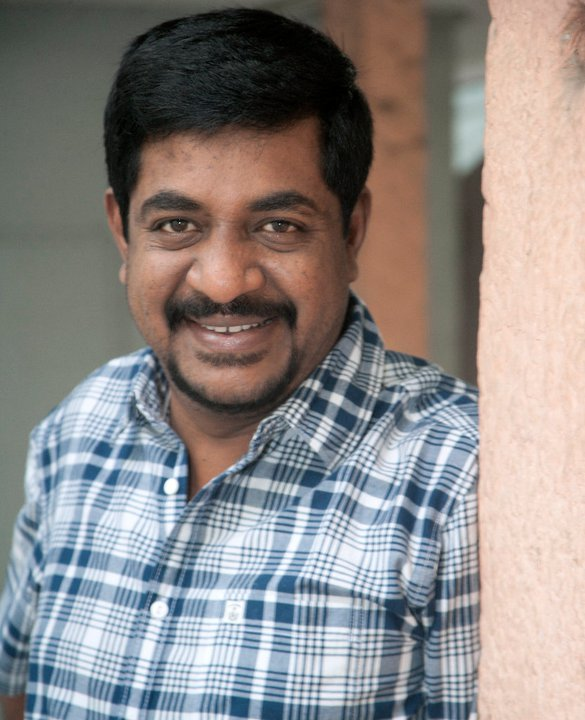
Yogaraj Bhat

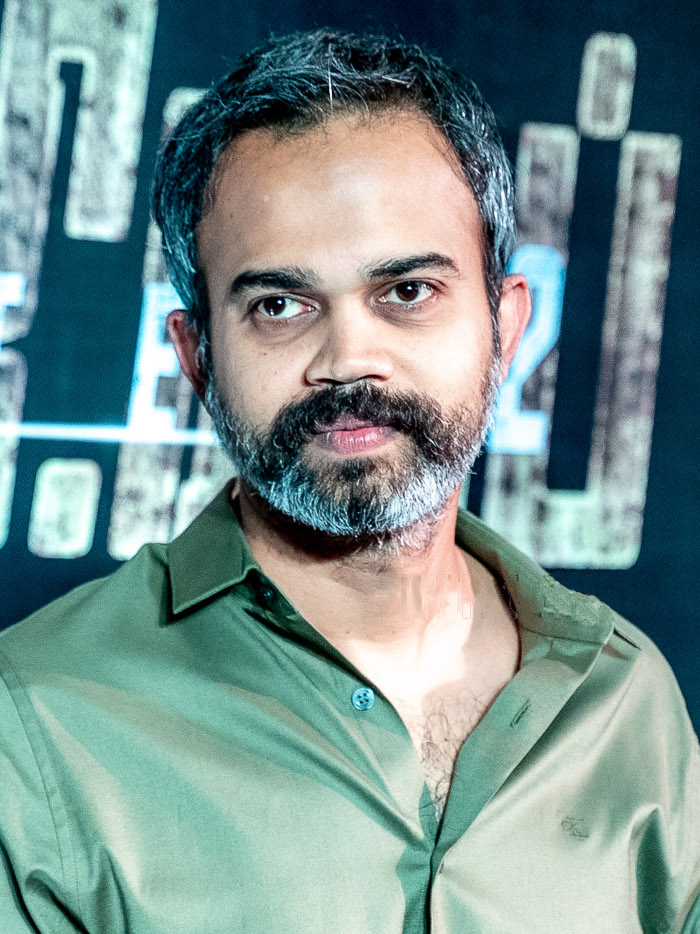
Prashanth Neel

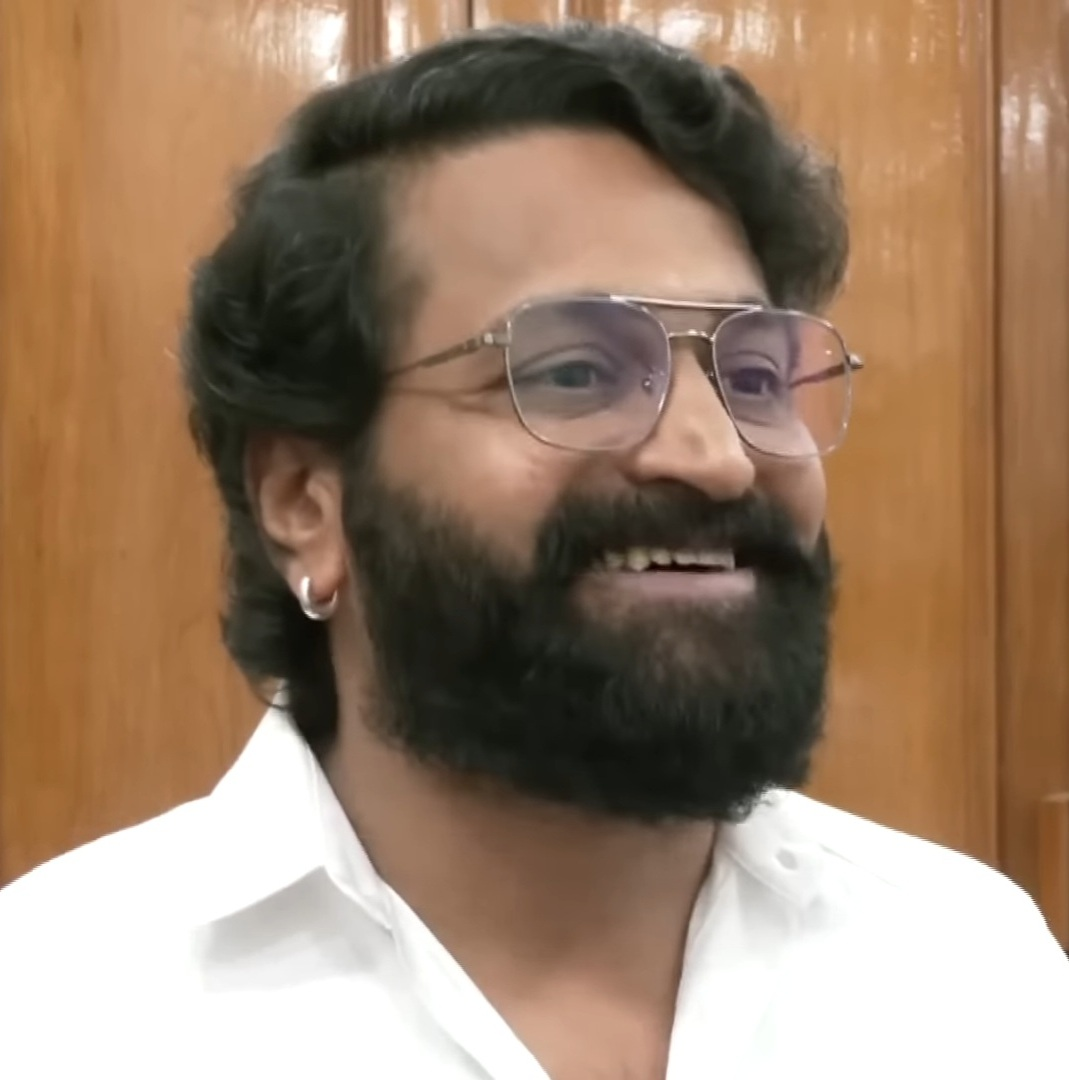
Rishabh Shetty

Prominent directors of the contemporary Kannada cinema

The new-age actors of Kannada cinema, Sudeepa, Darshan, Puneeth Rajkumar, Ganesh, Yash, Rakshit Shetty, and Rishab Shetty are some of the highest-paid actors.

The cult Ganesh-starrer, Mungaru Male (2006), was the first Kannada film to cross the ₹50 crore box-office collection mark. It was the first film to run for over 865 days in the history of Kannada cinema.

The 2015 release, RangiTaranga, starring Nirup Bhandari and directed by Anup Bhandari, created a huge overseas market for Kannada cinema with a mega release, amassing $318,000 in the United States alone. It went on to become the first Kannada film to enter the New York box-office listing, the first Kannada film to complete a theatrical run of 50 days in the United States, and the first Kannada film ever to release in several countries across the world; it ran for 365 days in Bangalore.

The Rakshit Shetty starrer, Kirik Party (2016), went on to become one of the highest-grossing Kannada films by collecting ₹50 crores, against a production budget ₹4 crores, and completed a theatrical run of 150 days in the main cities of Karnataka.

In 2018, the cult Yash starrer K.G.F: Chapter 1 became the first Kannada film to gross ₹250 crores at the box office. Its sequel, K.G.F: Chapter 2 (2022), made ₹ 1000 crores at the box office. The teaser for K.G.F: Chapter 2 trended at No. 1 on YouTube and gained more than 250 million views on the platform as of April 2022, surpassing the views of Avengers: Endgame. It became the highest-grossing Kannada film of all-time with a record collection of over ₹1000 crores within India itself.

Kananda cinema was reported to have 8% market share in the gross domestic box-office collections from the period of January to July 2022, making it the fourth-biggest Indian film industry. RangiTaranga, Kirik Party, K.G.F: Chapter 1, K.G.F: Chapter 2, and Kantara were the first Kannada films to get international audiences, and bring the industry to a global reach.

The 2020s have seen a rise in experimental and science-fiction storytelling in Kannada cinema, with films such as Blink (2024).

=== Film scores ===
Composer Hamsalekha is usually referred to by the title Naadha Brahma (transl. The Brahma of Music) who is considered to be the major cause for the change in the music composing and lyric writing style which would appeal much to the younger generation. He integrated folk and introduced western musical sensibilities into the Kannada cinema.

Mano Murthy scored the blockbuster film Mungaru Male starring Ganesh and Pooja Gandhi. Upon the album's release, it topped the charts with the song "Anisuthide" receiving significant radio and TV air time. The album emerged as a massive success topping every Kannada music chart. It was reported that by mid-May 2007, over 200,000 copies were sold in compact discs.

== International recognition ==
=== 1960–1969 ===
The 1964 movie Naandi set a landmark by being the first ever Kannada film to be screened at an international film festival. It was screened at IFFI 1992 Kannada cinema Retrospect. The 1969 movie Uyyale was screened twice at the IFFI retrospect—once in 1992 and again in 2019.

=== 1970–1979 ===
The 1970 movie Samskara won the Bronze Leopard at Locarno International Film Festival. The 1977 movie Ghatashraddha which had the distinction of being shown at the Museum of Modern Art, New York, became the only Indian film to be chosen by the National Archive of Paris among 100 others, during the centenary celebrations of cinema. It also won the Ducats Award at the Manneham Film Festival Germany. At the 2009 International Film Festival of India, it was announced one of the 20 best films in Indian cinema, having received 1.6 million votes. During February 2024, US film publication Variety announced that the Martin Scorsese's World Cinema Project, George Lucas' Hobson/Lucas Family Foundation and Shivendra Singh Dungarpur's Film Heritage Foundation (FHF) have partnered to restore the film in time for its 50th anniversary from the original camera negative preserved at India's National Film Development Corporation of India-National Film Archive of India. The restored version was showcased in the Venice Classics section of the 81st Venice International Film Festival.

The 1978 movie Ondanondu Kaladalli was released at The Guild Theatre, 50 Rockefeller Plaza on 17 May 1982. Vincent Canby, the chief film critic of The New York Times, called the movie "that is both exotic as well as surprising in view of all the bodies on the ground at the end, sweet natured!". The film was subtitled into English for its American premiere on 18 October 1995 in Shriver Hall at the Johns Hopkins University as part of the 1995 Milton S. Eisenhower Symposium "Framing Society : A Century of Cinema".

=== 1980–1989 ===
The 1981 movie Simhada Mari Sainya was selected for the Paris and Moscow International Film Festivals. The 1987 film Pushpaka Vimana featured retrospectively in the Shanghai International Film Festival and Whistling Woods Film Festival.

=== 1990–1999 ===
The 1999 film Upendra was screened at the Yubari International Fantastic Film Festival in Japan in 2001. The 1999 movie Deveeri was selected for 18 international film festivals including the International Film Festival Rotterdam, Jeonju International Film Festival (2003), the 44th London International Film Festival and the Cairo International Film Festival.

=== 2000–2009 ===
The 2000 movie Munnudi was screened at Palm Springs International Film Festival (2002). The 2002 movie Atithi was screened at Cairo International Film Festival. The 2002 movie Dweepa was screened at the Moscow International Film Festival. The 2004 movie Hasina was screened at Berlin's Asia Pacific Film Festival. The 2004 movie Bimba was selected for the Bangkok International Film Festival. The 2006 movie Thutturi won the Best Audience Award at the 9th Dhaka International Film Festival. and won the Earth Vision Award of 2005-06 at the 15th Tokyo Global Environmental Film Festival. The 2006 movie Naayi Neralu was screened at six international film festivals including International Film Festival Rotterdam, Bangkok International Film Festival, Palm Springs International Film Festival, Osian's Asian Film Festival (2006) and the Karachi International Film Festival. The 2006 movie Care of Footpath was selected for the Kids for Kids Film Festival at Cyprus and the 2006 film Cyanide was selected for the London Film Festival.

=== 2010–2019 ===
The 2010 movie Kanasemba Kudureyaneri won the NETPAC Award at the Asiatica Film Mediale (Italy) (2010). The 2011 film Koormavatara was screened in 17 film festivals and won acclaims at the film festivals of Bangkok, New York and Vancouver. Prasad (2012) premiered at the Berlin International Film Festival and was reported to be the first Kannada movie to premier at that festival. The 2012 movie Edegarike was selected for Mumbai Women's International Film Festival (2013). The 2013 movie Lucia premiered at the London Indian Film Festival on 20 July 2013. It won the Best Film Audience Choice award at the festival. It was also screened at the Zurich Film Festival. The 2015 movie Thithi won accolades at multiple international film festivals including 2 awards (Pardo d'oro Cineasti Del Presente Premio Nescens and Swatch First Feature Award) at the 68th Locarno International Film Festival and also won awards at the 19th Shanghai International Film Festival. The 2016 movie Railway Children won the Ecumenical Jury Award (special mention) at Zlín Film Festival. The 2016 film Bombeyaata won three awards at seven International Film Festivals. Hombanna (2017) won four awards at Five Continents International Film Festival, Venezuela and was also selected for screening at the 2017 Miami Independent Film Festival. The 2018 movie Nathicharami and Balekempa were screened at the MAMI Mumbai Film Festival. Balekempa also won the FIPRESCI Award at the 47th International Film Festival Rotterdam. The 2019 movie Arishadvarga also premiered at the London Indian Film Festival followed by the Asian Premiere at the Singapore South Asian International Film Festival and the North American Premiere at the Vancouver International South Asian Film Festival. The 2019 movie Manaroopa won 10 awards at various international film festivals including the Best Thriller Film at Out of the Can International Film Festival at England, Best Experimental Film at the Cafe Irani Chaii International Film Festival and was officially selected for the Miami Independent Film Festival in the United States and the Istanbul Film Awards in Turkey. The 2019 movie Bell Bottom premiered at the Indian Film Week in Japan in 2020.

=== 2020–2021 ===
In the post - pandemic era, Kannada cinema started making waves across the world in several international film festivals. Pinki Elli? was screened at around 50 International Film Festivals including the Prague International Film Festival and the Hainan International Film Festival. It opened the Busan International Film Festival and was screened at Hong Kong International Film Festival. It won three awards at the New York Indian Film Festival. It also won the Best Film award at the Asian Film Festival Barcelona 2021. Amruthamathi was screened at ten international film festivals including Boston Film Festival, Atlanta Film Festival, Austria Film Festival and won multiple awards. Abhilash Shetty's Koli Taal premiered at the 21st New York Indian Film Festival. It was then screened at various film festivals including the 18th Indian Film Festival of Stuttgart and the 12th Indian Film Festival of Melbourne. Neeli Hakki was selected for multiple international Film festivals including the New York Indian Film Festival. Pinni (2020) was selected in the competition category at the New York Indian Film Festival. Daari Yaavudayya Vaikunthakke won a total of 94 awards including multiple awards at Rajasthan Film Festival and other international film festivals like Sundance Film Festival, Barcelona, Nawada, 7 Colours International Film Festival and Golden Sparrow International Film Festival. Illiralaare Allige Hogalaare won the Director's Vision Award at the 18th Indian Film Festival of Stuggart. It was earlier screened at the Dhaka International Film Festival and had won an award at the Rome Film Festival. It also won award at the Spain International Film Festival in Madrid. Baraguru Ramachandrappa's Mooka Nayaka won the Best Picture of the Decade Award by competing with movies from different languages around the globe. Jeevnane Nataka Samy (2021) was screened at Miami International Film Festival. Avalakki Pavalakki won five awards in various categories at Uravatti International Film Festival, Indo Global International Film Festival, American Golden Pictures International Film Festival, Oniros Film Festival and the Sweden Film Festival. Rudri won multiple awards at Oniros Film Festival, Tagore International Film Festival and the Vindhya International Film Festival. Naanu Ladies had its world premier at the 16th Tasveer South Asian Film Festival in Seattle. It went on to win the Best Narrative Feature Award at the Kashish Mumbai International Queer Film Festival.

Pedro had its world premiere in the New Currents Section at the 26th edition of the Busan International Film Festival. and was shortlisted for the Directors Fortnight Cannes 2020. It went on to win the Best Director Award in the Crouching Tigers competition section at the Pingyao International Film Festival in Shanxi, China. It was also the joint winner of the Montgolfiere D'Argent Award at the Festival Des 3 Continents, Nantes, France. It was screened at the Indian Film Festival of Los Angeles (IFFLA) and at the Indian Film Festival of Melbourne. It was also screened at BFI London Film Festival, Golden Horse Film Festival and Awards, IndieLisboa International Film Festival, Kazan Film Festival, IFFSA Toronto and Greek Film Archive 12th Athens Avant-Garde Film Festival. Dollu was screened at the Dhaka International Film Festival. It was shortlisted for screening at 72nd Berlinale's European Film Market and the Dallas ft worth South Asian Film Festival (virtual). It was also screened at the Caleidoscope Indian Film Festival Boston where it won the Best Indian Film award. It also won the Best Kannada Movie award at Innovative International Film Festival. Namma Magu received recognition from the International Organization for Migration (IOM).

=== 2022–2025 ===
Taledanda (2022) was selected for London International Film Festival. Koli Esru was selected for screening at New York Indian Film Festival (2022). Shivamma was selected for Marche du Film (2022)—the business counterpart of the Cannes Film Festival. It was also screened at the 27th Busan International Film Festival where it won the New Currents Award given to first or second feature film of a new Asian director. It also won the Young Jury Award at the 44th edition of the Three Continents Festival. It was also selected for screening at the US and Australian film festivals in 2023. Man Of The Match (2022), produced by Puneeth Rajkumar, was selected for screening at the 14th New York City Independent Film Festival in the foreign film category. In 2022, Shuddhi (2017) and Bell Bottom (2019) premiered at the Indian Film Week in Japan. Vagachi Pani was selected for the co-production market at the film festival in Busan. Thayi Kastur Gandhi was screened at LA Film Festival and it won the Best Editor award at the Dallas International Film Festival. Hadinelentu was screened at the Jiseok section of the Busan International Film Festival (2022).

1888 was screened at several International film festivals across the world. The 2012 movie Edegarike was screened at the Indo-French International Film Festival in 2023. Kantara, Koli Esru and Hadinelentu were nominated in various categories at the 14th edition of Indian Film Festival of Melbourne(IFFM) - 2023. Devara Kanasu was screened at around 30 film festivals, including an entry to participate in the panel screening and final selection of the Cannes Film Festival. Brahma Kamala won several awards and accolades at various film festivals including the Eediplay International Film Festival in France, Wonderland International Film Festival in Sydney, Old Monk International Film Festival in Nepal and the Indo-Singapore Film Festival. Shivamma won the Grand Prix Award at the 17th Andrei Tarkovsky Zerkalo International Film Festival, Ivanovo (2023). Hadinelentu and Koli Esru won awards at the Ottawa Indian Film Festival Awards 2023. Koli Esru also premiered at the Indo-German Film Week. Naanu Kusuma won award at the Gange Sur Garonne International Film Festival (2023) in France. Chinnara Chandra was selected for Ahmedabad International Children Film Festival and Melbourne International Film Festival. Kantara won the Special Jury Award, also known as the Silver Peacock Award—at the 54th International Film Festival of India (2023)—making it the first Kannada movie to win that award. Mrityorma won four awards at the 6th Moonwhite Films International Film Festival. Timmana Mottegalu was screened at the 29th Kolkata International Film Festival. Tharini was selected for screening at the Rajasthan International Film Festival.

Kannada short film Suryakanthihooge Modhalugothagidhu (Sunflowers Were the First Ones to Know) was a part of the "Film Schools' Competition" at the Cannes Film Festival held from 14 to 25 May 2024. Mikka Bannada Hakki won the Best Actor Award at the Shanghai International Film Festival (2024). Kenda premiered at the New York University Tisch School of the Arts and Switzerland. Sindhu Sreenivasa Murthy was selected for the BAFTA Breakthrough Talent Award 2024-25 for her debut directorial Aachar & Co. None of Her was screened at Chennai International Film Festival (2024).

Abhilash Shetty's film, Naale Rajaa Koli Majaa had its Asian premiere at the 19th Jogja-NETPAC Asian Film Festival It was screened at the 25th NYIFF and was nominated for Best Screenplay. It was also screened at several international film festivals across Canada, Europe, and the United States including the India Film Festival Of Alberta, Asian Pop-Up Cinema (USA), and the Bucharest Best Comedy Film Festival.

Vagachipani premiered at the 75th Berlin International Film Festival (2025) and became the first Kannada film ever to have its premiere at that film festival. It won Special Jury Mention at the "Spirit of Fire Festival" (2025) in Russia. It was also screened at the Cinemajove Film Festival in Spain, the Sydney Film Festival, the Bangkok International Film Festival and won awards at the Toronto International Film Festival. Alindia Radio was screened at the Indo-French International Film Festival (2025) and Indian Film Festival in Melbourne. Swapna Mantapa was selected for the Chicago International Film Festival and reached semi-finals in the competition section. My Hero (2025) won accolades at International Film Festivals in Canada, Thailand, the US, Italy, India, Sweden, Hungary, Russia, Singapore and Germany. The 2023 movie Ramzan won award at the 14th Universal Film Makers Council and Genesis Ultima International Film Festival (2025). ' Nimbiya Banada Myaga - Page 1 won the "Best Film Award" at the Dhanbad International Film Festival; the "Best Director Award" at the 7 Sisters North East International Film Festival; the "Best Director Award", the "Best Cinematographer Award" and the "Best Supporting Actor Award" at the 7th Crown International Film Festival in Bangladesh. Furthermore, the film earned another accolade at the Thailand International Film Festival. Don't Tell Mother had its World Premiere at the prestigious 30th Busan International Film Festival (2025) in the Windows To Asian Cinema section, becoming the only Indo-Australian production to do so. The psychological thriller Green (2025) was reported to have gained significant national and international film festival attention, winning 19 awards.

=== 2026 onwards ===
Bayakegalu Berooridaga (2026) won 25 National and International Awards including "Best Jury's Special Mention Regional Feature Film Award" at the Himachal Pradesh International Film Festival (2024), "Best Women Director" and "Best Feature Film" at the 6th Penzance International Film Festival (UK)(2024) and "Best Story" at the Chambal International Film Festival (2024). Selected from 1,200 entries submitted from across the world, Vanya emerged as the only Kannada film at the 24th Pune International Film Festival (2026) drawing strong audience response with repeated screening and critical attention, sparking discussion and appreciation on an international stage. Baraguru Ramachandrappa's film Mahakavi reached the semi finals of the "Competition" category at the Hollywood International Golden Age Film Festival. P. Sheshadri's Ruby Cube was selected for screening at the Indian Film Festival in Kazan, Russia’s Republic of Tatarstan in October 2026. Shankarabharanna (2026) became the first Kannada film to be screened at the 39th Golden Rooster and Hundred Flowers Film Festival in Xiamen, China.

== National recognition ==
- The 1959 movie Mahishasura Mardini was dubbed in seven other languages and is retrospectively identified as among the first major Pan-India films.
- The song Baare Baare from the 1972 movie Naagarahaavu was the first slow-motion song of Indian cinema.
- The 1986 movie Anuraga Aralithu was the first Indian movie to be remade in seven other languages.
- The 1986 movie Africadalli Sheela was the first Indian movie to be shot in African forests.
- The 1987 movie Ondu Muttina Kathe was the first Indian film to have an underwater action sequence shot in an ocean outside India without the help of oxygen mask.
- The 1989 movie Idu Saadhya created a record by becoming the first Indian movie to be shot within a span of 36 hours.
- The 1991 movie Shanti Kranti was the first Indian multilingual movie and was the most expensive Indian film at the time of its release.
- The 1995 movie Om is the only Indian movie to have been re-released 550 times.
- The 2005 movie Shanti was the second Indian film to enter the Guinness Book of World Records in the Fewest actors in a narrative film category. It had only one actor with the other characters represented through voice and no physical appearance.
- The 2006 Kannada movie Mungaru Male was the first Indian movie to run for a year in a multiplex.
- The 2022 film K.G.F: Chapter 2 became the first movie to gross more than ₹400 crores within India in its opening weekend. It also became the first South Indian movie to gross more than ₹550 crores in its opening weekend.
- The 2022 film Kantara collected ₹25.5 crore in its sixth weekend which was reported to be the highest sixth weekend collection as well as the highest sixth week collection for an Indian movie. Its seventh week collection of ₹24 crores was the highest for an Indian movie surpassing ₹11 crores collected by Baahubali 2: The Conclusion in its seventh week.
- The 2025 movie Kantara: Chapter 1 became the highest-grossing film in the world for the week when it grossed $53 million worldwide during its first week.
- K.G.F: Chapter 2 (2022) and Kantara: Chapter 1 (2025) were the first two Indian movies to gross a minimum of ₹50 crores in 5 languages.

=== Awards ===
Dadasaheb Phalke Awardees
Year	Recipient	Note(s)
1995	Rajkumar	Actor
2024	Anant Nag	Actor

National Film Award for Best Feature Film
Year	Film	Director	Producer
1970	Samskara	Pattabhirama Reddy	Pattabhirama Reddy
1975	Chomana Dudi	B. V. Karanth	Praja Films
1977	Ghatashraddha	Girish Kasaravalli	Sadanand Suvarna
1986	Tabarana Kathe	Girish Kasaravalli	Girish Kasaravalli
1997	Thaayi Saheba	Girish Kasaravalli	Jayamala
2001	Dweepa	Girish Kasaravalli	Soundarya

Nargis Dutt Award for Best Feature Film on National Integration
Year	Film	Director
1978	Grahana	T. S. Nagabharana
1989	Santha Shishunala Sharifa	T. S. Nagabharana
2006	Kallarali Hoovagi	T. S. Nagabharana
2018	Ondalla Eradalla	D. Satya Prakash

National Film Award for Best Film on Family Welfare
Year	Film	Director
2004	Hasina	Girish Kasaravalli

National Film Award for Best Film on Other Social Issues
Year	Film	Director
1985	Accident	Shankar Nag
2000	Munnudi	P. Sheshadri

National Film Award for Best Popular Film
Year	Film	Director	Producer
1987	Pushpaka Vimana	Singeetam Srinivasa Rao	Shringar Nagaraj
2022	Kantara	Rishab Shetty	Vijay Kiragandur

== State recognition ==
Karnataka Chalanachitra Kalavidara Sangha in Chamrajapet

=== State award ===
- Karnataka State Film Awards

=== State film festivals ===
- Bangalore International Film Festival

=== Other awards ===
- Filmfare Awards South
- SIIMA Awards
- IIFA Utsavam
- Udaya Film Awards
- Suvarna Film Awards
- Mirchi Music Awards South
- South Scope Awards
- Chandanavana Film Critics Academy Awards
- Hello Gandhinagara Awards
- Chittara Star Awards

=== Film schools ===
The first government institute in India to start technical courses related to films was established in 1941 named as occupational institute then called the Sri Jayachamarajendra (S J) Polytechnic in Bangalore.

In September 1996, two specialised courses, Cinematography and Sound & Television were separated and the Government Film and Television Institute was started at Hesaraghatta, under the World Bank Assisted Project for Technician Development in India.

== See also ==
- List of Kannada-language films
- Media in Karnataka
- Cinema of India
- Media of India
- List of Kannada film actresses
- List of highest-grossing Kannada films
