= Daughter's Nameplate Campaign =

Social campaign in India by Sunil Jaglan

- Founder: Sunil Jaglan
- Country: India
- Launched: 2015 July 5 (10 years ago)
- Status: Active

The Daughter’s Nameplate Campaign, also known as Laado Swabhiman or Digital India with Laado, is a gender equality initiative launched on 5 July 2015 by Indian activist Sunil Jaglan in Bibipur village, Jind district, Haryana, India. The campaign encourages households to display nameplates bearing the names of daughters instead of traditional male family heads, aiming to challenge patriarchal norms and promote the value of girls in society.

It is part of Jaglan’s broader efforts to combat female foeticide and improve gender ratios, complementing his Selfie With Daughter campaign and the Indian government’s Beti Bachao, Beti Padhao initiative.

== History ==
The campaign began on 5 July 2015, inspired by Jaglan’s observation of societal bias against daughters, notably after nurses refused sweets at his daughter Nandini’s birth in 2012.

Jaglan, then sarpanch of Bibipur, initiated the campaign to replace traditional nameplates with daughters’ names, starting with his own home, which displays “Nandini Niwas”.

The initiative gained traction after Prime Minister Narendra Modi praised Jaglan's Selfie With Daughter campaign in Mann Ki Baat, indirectly boosting visibility for the nameplate effort.

By 2020, the campaign had spread to villages like Kirori, Nuh, and Alipur, with Kirori becoming the first village in India where every household displayed a daughter’s nameplate.

As of 2025, over 50,000 nameplates bearing daughters' names have been installed across India, including in Haryana, Uttar Pradesh, Madhya Pradesh, and Maharashtra.

== Implementation ==
The campaign involves village panchayats replacing traditional nameplates with those bearing daughters' names, often including email addresses and the tagline "Digital India with Laado".

== Impact ==
The Daughter’s Name Plate Campaign has contributed to shifting societal attitudes toward gender equality, particularly in rural Haryana, where the sex ratio improved from 876 girls per 1,000 boys in 2015 to 923 in 2023, according to Haryana Chief Minister Manohar Lal Khattar.

The campaign aligns with India’s Beti Bachao, Beti Padhao initiative, emphasising pride in daughters and combating female foeticide.

It has been adopted in over 140 villages, supported by Jaglan’s Selfie With Daughter Foundation and 8,000 volunteers.

The campaign received endorsements from notable figures, including former President of india Pranab Mukherjee, who supported its integration into his adopted villages in Haryana.
