= Gaali Band Ghar =

Indian social campaign

- Native name: गाली बंद घर
- English name: No Swearing House
- Date: 2014–present
- Location: India
- Also known as: Ban on Abusive Words
- Theme: Anti Profanity
- Motive: Respectful communication
- Patron: Sunil Jaglan

The Gaali Band Ghar (transl. Abuse-Free Homes) campaign is an initiative launched in 2014 by Sunil Jaglan, founder of the Selfie With Daughter Foundation, from Bibipur village in Jind, Haryana, India. The campaign aims to address and reduce the use of gender-based abusive language in daily conversations, promoting respectful communication within households and communities. It gained national attention after being featured in Prime Minister Narendra Modi’s Mann Ki Baat radio program.

== History ==
Jaglan observed that men in his village Bibipur, frequently used abusive language, particularly towards women, during panchayat meetings. His inspiration to start the campaign came after his daughter returned home asking him about the meaning of a curse she had heard on the playground.

== Motive ==
The campaign aims to establish communities, households, or streets that commit to refraining from the use of profanity. Village leaders officially designate these areas as "Gaali-Bandh" or "No-Swearing."

== 2025 Survey ==
In 2025, a survey conducted by Sunil Jaglan under the Gaali Bandh Ghar campaign collected data from 70,000 individuals across India, with a focused sample of 7,400 residents in Haryana. The survey revealed that 62% of Haryana respondents (approximately 4,600 individuals from Jind, Hisar, Gurugram, and Nuh districts) regularly used gender-based abusive language at home. Nationally, the survey identified varying prevalence across states:

• Delhi: 80% (highest prevalence)

• Punjab: 78%

• Uttar Pradesh: 74%

• Rajasthan: 68%

• Maharashtra: 58%

• Gujarat: 55%

• Madhya Pradesh: 48%

• Uttarakhand: 45%

• Seven Sister States (Arunachal Pradesh, Assam, Manipur, Meghalaya, Mizoram, Nagaland, Tripura): 20% (average)

• Kashmir: 15% (lowest prevalence)

The survey further indicated that 30% of women and girls either used or tolerated such language. Additionally, 20% of youth respondents attributed their use of abusive language to influences from online games, social media, and over-the-top (OTT) media platforms. Approximately 30% of respondents reported requiring abusive content to enjoy humor.

== Impact ==
The campaign has garnered support from women who are frustrated with sexist slurs. Many participants have reported that the initiative has helped them realise they do not need to use abusive language, leading to a noticeable reduction in their own usage of such language.

Following an incident in which U.S. President Joe Biden used profanity towards a journalist, the Cosmopolitan (magazine) noted that Sunil Jaglan, a village sarpanch in India, is running a campaign to combat sexist slurs. The magazine highlighted the contrast between Jaglan's efforts to address abusive language against women and the president's use of profanity in the White House. This commentary attracted significant international attention.
