= Daughters of Mother India =

- Directed by: Vibha Bakshi
- Produced by: Vibha Bakshi & Vishal Bakshi
- Cinematography: Attar Singh Saini
- Edited by: Hemanti Sarkar
- Music by: Bapi Tutul
- Release date: 2014
- Running time: 45 minutes
- Country: India
- Languages: Hindi & English

Daughters of Mother India is a 2014 documentary film directed and produced by Vibha Bakshi on the aftermath of the brutal gang rape and murder of a 23-year-old medical student Nirbhaya in Delhi on 16 December 2012. For the first time in the history of the Delhi Police, Vibha was able to gain access to the Delhi Police control and command room right after Nirbhaya's death.

The documentary throws light on how people's perception is changing towards sexual assault against women with a focus on the police. The documentary has received numerous awards both nationally and internationally, including from the President of India for Best Film Social Issue in the 62nd National Film Festival Awards. The documentary was screened for over 150,000 police officers in India to gender sensitize the force.

== Background ==
The documentary was made on the aftermath of the sexual assault of Nirbhaya that happened on the intervening night of 16 December 2012 in a moving bus in New Delhi. The 23-year-old physiotherapy student was returning home after watching the 'Life of Pi' movie with her male friend. Six men including a juvenile brutally gang-raped her. The rape turned even more brutal when a rusted rod was inserted inside her and pulled out with so much force that her intestines spilled out. Her male friend was physically assaulted. They both were thrown out of the moving bus by the culprits. Nirbhaya was admitted to a hospital in India. Later when her condition deteriorated, she was airlifted and was shifted to a hospital in Singapore for further treatment by the Government of India. She succumbed to her injuries due to multiple organ failure.

The incident took widespread outrage and concern over the safety of women. Common people gathered in large numbers throughout India for many days to show solidarity with Nirbhaya and to demand quick justice. They faced the water cannons from the police in the middle of the December cold. Seeing the huge public outrage government came into action. A 3- member Anti-rape recommendation committee was formed, which gave its recommendation within a month.

A special act Nirbhaya Act was passed through an ordinance in 2013 for women's safety that overlooked offenses such as rape, sexual harassment, acid attacks, voyeurism, and stalking.

The pressure of public outrage was so much that later changes were done in Juvenile Justice law as well which paved the way for individuals between age 16 and 18 to be tried as an adult in case of heinous crimes.

In spite of the quick and radical changes, crimes against women continue. The documentary focuses on change in the mindsets of people, including the police and judiciary to bring in the desired change for a safer and more equitable society.

== History ==
The documentary was released in 2014. It is an Indian filmmaker Vibha Bakshi's journey in the aftermath of 16 December 2012 gang rape.

Vibha says "It was the brutality of the incident and the intensity of public protest for justice that compelled me to make this documentary. The focus was the Police. Unless the Police are gender sensitized, justice will not only be delayed, it will be denied. It is easy to sensationalize an issue but very hard to sensitize. I have a choice. To focus on a burning country or ignite hope. I will go with hope. Because without hope no fight can be won. And the fight for gender safety is a fight we cannot afford to lose."

In the documentary, Vibha has also highlighted the sexual assault case of 5-year-old Gudiya bringing the focus to child sexual abuse as well.

For the first time in the history of the police force, the Police Commissioner of Delhi Neeraj Kumar granted permission to film inside the Delhi Police Control and Command room.

== Production ==
The documentary Daughters of Mother India is directed and produced by award-winning filmmaker Vibha Bakshi. it is a 45 minutes documentary that puts the onus on society to make change happen regarding gender injustice.

=== Development ===
Vibha says "Daughters of Mother India is a cry of my conscience. As a daughter, as a sister, a wife and a mother searching I am searching for answers to so many questions."

She wanted to understand the complexities and the reason behind these crimes and the possible solutions after the gruesome Nirbhaya Rape case. She wanted to know that after the case which shook the nation, did anything change? Vibha says in an interview to Times of India "After the protests broke in support of Nirbhaya, I stood up as a proud daughter of India, because I believe, there is no other country in the world that has reacted to a gender crime the way India has. I don't want the momentum to stop."

Another film made on a similar subject was banned for various reasons.

=== Filming ===
Shooting for the film was done between 2013 and 2014. Vibha was able to get access to the key stakeholders from the Police, Judiciary, Academia society, including the member of the Anti- Rape Recommendation Committee for her film. She uses the voices of all the stakeholders to break the conspiracy of silence on gender crimes and gender injustice.

== Interview ==
Vibha has Interviewed many dignitaries for this documentary which include member of Anti Rape Recommendation Committee Leila Seth, Additional Solicitor General Supreme Court Indira Jaising, Sociologist Deepankar Gupta, Delhi Police Commissioner Neeraj Kumar, Head of Delhi Police Unit for Women and Children Suman Nalwa, activist Kiran Bedi, principal of Sanskriti Public School, Abha Sahgal, social analyst Mubin Zehr and founder of Asmita Theatre Group Arvind Gaur.

Member of Anti-Rape Panel Recommendation Committee Justice Leila Seth said "The Government was forced to do something (After Delhi Gang Rape), and it decided to make a committee, and as committee members we three decided that we must get these recommendations out within the month because otherwise, we will lose the momentum." She also said that "She (Nirbhaya) has done a great deal for others, not for herself, but for other women who are suffering from gender injustice."

Additional Solicitor General Supreme Court, Indira Jaising explains that how withdrawals of the case by the victim, inability to present medical proofs, and slow judicial process affect the judgments. She says "Crime against women have been low on priority both by police and judiciary."

Sociologist Dipankar Gupta opines that smaller crimes when ignored are then converted into bigger crimes. He says "Roots of patriarchy and male violence this kind of violence are very deep, so you cannot pull out the roots, but what you can do is cut each of if its branches with law enforcement."

Vibha has also asked for the solution, to which social activist Kiran Bedi says "You can't address the crime against women issues in India or anywhere in the world without the 6Ps formula, for me the 6Ps are Parents or people, the second P is Police- It better do a better Job, Third is Prosecution – It should do a better job, Politician- Better give faster laws, 5th is Prison- it must stop contaminating and the last P is very important called the press, If these Ps work together women are the biggest beneficiaries."

== Release ==
The documentary was released in 2014. The film was screened on various national and international platforms. It was released on the Viacom18 network's 10 different channels in 8 different languages.

== Reception ==
The documentary was appreciated and critically acclaimed across the police, judiciary, and academia. The National film jury stated "Daughters of Mother India determinedly and explicitly spotlighted the burning issue of rape and gender violence in the country." It made possible many things that have never happened before. The film screening is used by the Indian Police force for gender sensitization. The film has already been screened for over 150,000 police officers in India to gender sensitize the force. Daughters of Mother India is also part of the curriculum of 200 schools and colleges across India.

Commissioner of Police, Delhi Neeraj Kumar said "I would not say that the police force will become sympathetic overnight, it will take time, but over a while, it will change."

Chief of anti-terror squad Himanshu Roy said "This is what a film can do, we have a task. My fellow brother and sister fellow officers out there that society wants us to be sensitive and they want us to have a zero-tolerance policy towards crime."

The Huffington Post said "the documentary teaches Indian police the reality of reporting the rape." It also published that "Daughters of Mother India is India story of resolve, activism, and hope."

Tina Brown Journalist said "Vibha has given an eloquent voice to the need for hope in this critical fight against gender violence at the Women in the World Conference."

Josette Shreeram the Global President & CEO of Asia Society said "More than a documentary Daughters of Mother India has become a movement to encourage change…"

Jim Luce the founder of James Jay Dudely Foundation which supports the young global leadership impacting positive social change said about the movie in Huffington post "India’s story of resolve activism and hope, a jarring wake-up call for men like me"

The film explores reforms in the police and judicial system..." – published the Hollywood Reporter

"Amidst hysteria, Daughters of Mother India gives hope." - Hindu

Payal Mohanka of The Quint states "Daughters of Mother India momentum continues…" - The Quint

== Accolades ==
Year	Award	Category	Work	Result	Ref(s)
2015	62nd National Film Awards	Best Film on Social Issues	Daughters of Mother India	Won	
2016	The Cannes Glass Lions award	Media Advocacy	Daughters of Mother India	Nominated	
2016	New York Indian Film Festival	Best documentary	Daughters of Mother India	Won	
2016	CAM International Film Festival	Documentary Film category	Daughters of Mother India	Won	
2016	New Zee Indian Women Awards	Entertainment	Daughters of Mother India	Won	
2016	Gold Stevie	PR Campaign of The Year	Daughters of Mother India	Won	
2016	The Cannes Glass Lions award	Crisis and Urgency PR	Daughters of Mother India	Nominated	
2016	SABRE Awards South Asia	Public Affairs & Government Relations	Daughters of Mother India	Won	
2017	Mumbrella Asia Awards	Bravery category	Daughters of Mother India	Won	
2017	Spikes Asia Awards	Crisis Communication & Issue Management	Daughters of Mother India	Won	
