= Sunil Jaglan =

Indian social activist

- सुनील जागलान
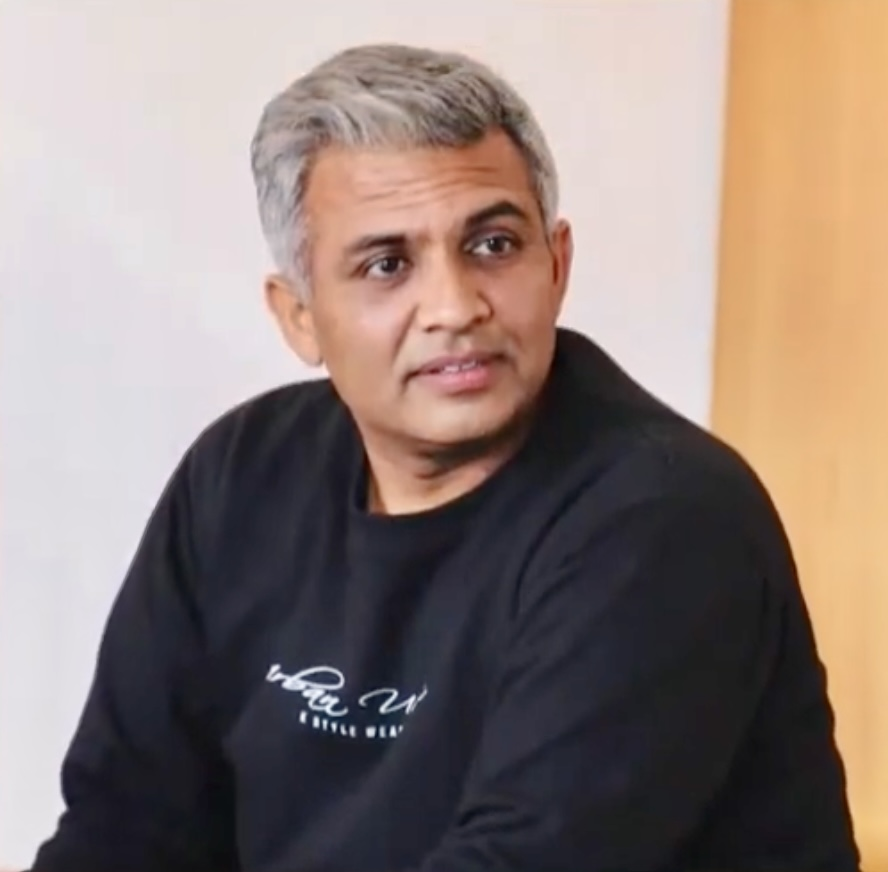
- Born: 19 June 1982 (age 44); Jind district, Haryana, India
- Education: Kurukshetra University
- Occupations: Academic; Social activist; Author; Consultant; Non-profit founder
- Years active: 2010–present
- Known for: Women’s empowerment, rural development
- Notable work: Daughter's Nameplate Campaign; Period Chart Campaign; Selfie With Daughter; Gaali Band Ghar; Lado Panchayat; Bibipur Model
- Spouse: Deepa Dhull
- Children: 2
- Website: suniljaglan.com

Sunil Jaglan (born 19 June 1982) is an Indian academic and social activist working for rural development, women's rights, and the welfare and education of the girl child in India. He is the founder of the Selfie With Daughter, a social media campaign that aims to promote gender equality and raise awareness about the importance of daughters in society to improve the sex ratio in India.

Jaglan serves as a professor of practice at Maharshi Dayanand University (MDU) and an advisor for the Sarpanch Samvaad initiative of the Quality Council of India, Gurugram University, and UNICEF. He is the founder and CEO of the non-profit organisation, Selfie With Daughter (SWD) Foundation and author of the book Lado Rights: Mahila Adhikaron Ka Sankalan.

== Early life ==
Sunil Jaglan was born on 19 June 1982 in Bibipur, Jind district, Haryana. He obtained his Bachelor of Computer Science degree from Kurukshetra University.

== Career ==
=== Sarpanch, Bibipur Panchayat (2010-2015) ===
Jaglan began his career as a mathematics teacher before resigning from his position after being elected as the sarpanch (village head) of Bibipur, a village in Haryana in 2010.

In 2012, he became an advocate for girls' rights, when nurses at the hospital refused to accept sweets for the birth of his daughter.

Jaglan launched more than 100 schemes for women’s empowerment during his tenure as an elected sarpanch.

Jaglan also initiated Mahila Gram Sabha (Women-Oriented Village Assembly) in 2012 and took the issue of female foeticide in Maha Khap Panchayat. Jaglan introduced the idea of having women participate in these Maha Khap Panchayats and organised these panchayats with Zoom during COVID-19.

=== Lado Rights: Mahila Adhikaron Ka Sankalan (2018) ===
He is the author of Lado Rights: Mahila Adhikaron Ka Sankalan published by Hindi Book Centre in 2018, which is based on Women's rights in India.

=== Pranab Mukherjee Foundation, SGT University (2018-2024) ===
Jaglan worked as a consultant at the Pranab Mukherjee Foundation from 2018 to 2023.

He later joined Shree Guru Gobind Singh Tricentenary University, Gurugram in 2023 as an outreach advisor and later as a professor of practice in the same university.

=== Quality Council of India, Gurugram University and UNICEF (2024-Present) ===
In November 2023, Jaglan was appointed as an executive member of the Quality Council of India to improve the quality of the Panchayati Raj system in villages throughout India.

In 2024, Jaglan was appointed as an advisor by UNICEF to develop Child & Women Friendly Panchayats.

He was also appointed as a consultant at Gurugram University, Haryana in 2024.

He serves as a professor of practice at MDU, Rohtak.

== Women's empowerment initiatives ==
=== Women-friendly panchayat (2010-2012) ===
During his tenure as sarpanch, Jaglan initiated a project by creating the official panchayat (village council) website, the first of its kind in the region. This website provided a comprehensive overview of the village's voters, infrastructure upgrades, and its historical background. Jaglan is noted for this innovation and referred to as the "high-tech sarpanch."

As an advisor to the Sarpanch Samvaad initiative, he has led strategies aimed at creating women- and child-friendly panchayats.

=== Fight against female foeticide (2010) ===
A survey revealed that Bibipur had 47 unmarried men well past the marriageable age, a situation attributed to the shortage of women in the area. This scarcity motivated Jaglan to fight against female foeticide, a campaign that earned Bibipur ₹1 crore from the Chief Minister of Haryana Bhupinder Singh Hooda in 2012.

If I had seen an equal number of men and women in my village, I might not have taken up the fight against female foeticide

— Sunil Jaglan, The Times of India

He motivated women to raise awareness about the issue through plays, rallies, and door-to-door campaigns. There’s been multiple instances where women initially wanted to abort female foetuses but ultimately decided against it due to the awareness efforts. In these cases, while the women themselves considered abortion, their fathers-in-law intervened to prevent it. The village now has several families with only daughters.

=== Lado Panchayat (2012) ===
The Lado Panchayat was initiated by Jaglan in 2012 to encourage female participation in governance, addressing issues like female foeticide, raising the Marriageable age, education, health and women's property rights.

Local issues are identified through consultations, and participants are connected via WhatsApp. A randomly selected Pradhan leads the meetings, and resolutions are drafted for submission to local and state authorities.

=== Flag unfurling by a mother of single girl child (2012) ===
On 15 August 2012 (Indian Independence Day), Jaglan invited a woman to unfurl the national flag for the first time. The village aimed to honour the mother of single girl child, highlighting the challenges faced by such mothers in the community.

Traditionally, the flag unfurling was performed by the village sarpanch, but Jaglan, chose to give this opportunity to the woman as a recognition of efforts against female foeticide. Several women were also honored for their contributions to the save girl child campaign during the event.

=== Campaign against Purdah practice in Haryana (2013) ===
Jaglan took a stand against purdah, a prevalent practice in his community. He encouraged his wife, Deepa, to remove her veil. When she did, he drove her around the village, inspiring 70 other women to follow suit that day.

Jaglan then launched a campaign against purdah, reaching over 100 villages. In 2017, he organised an event in Taloda village of Haryana where more than 50 women publicly discarded their veils. His efforts have led to 42 women representatives abandoning purdah, along with women in Sultanpur and Kaliwala villages. The Pranab Mukherjee Foundation has also joined this initiative, working to promote these changes in 100 villages across the state.

=== Lado Pustakalaya (Women’s library) (2014) ===
Jaglan established the Lado Pustakalaya, lit. 'Women’s library' in Bibipur village. It provides an environment for exam preparation, featuring individual study desks, charging stations, air conditioning, and WiFi. The library offers a peaceful space for uninterrupted study, which is often lacking in rural homes.

The former President, Pranab Mukherjee, praised the concept of Lado Pustakalaya and requested the establishment of these libraries under the Bibipur model of women empowerment in his hundred adopted villages in Haryana.

=== Gaali Band Ghar (2014) ===
In 2014, as the sarpanch of Bibipur village, Jaglan passed a resolution to ban abuse against women, resulting in a campaign that encouraged open discussions in the gram sabha about incidents of abuse.

In 2016, while implementing the Bibipur Model of Women Empowerment and Village Development in Taloda village under the Sabla campaign, it was determined that strict action, including filing FIRs, would be taken against those who abused women.

By 2019, recognising the need to address the issue from its roots, Jaglan emphasised the importance of starting discussions about abuse at the household level to foster societal awareness. He noted that eliminating abusive language from daily life could help prevent public abuse. Consequently, the Sabla campaign introduced the initiative "Gaali Bandh Ghar" to further this objective.

=== 'Selfie with Daughter' campaign (2015) ===
In June 2015, Jaglan launched the 'Selfie with Daughter' campaign to raise awareness about female foeticide and promote the value of daughters in society. The initiative encourages parents to take selfies with their daughters and share them on social media, fostering a positive mindset towards the girl child.

The campaign has been recognised globally and supported by notable figures, including Prime Minister Narendra Modi, contributing to improvements in Haryana's gender ratio. Over eight years, it has garnered participation from individuals in 80 countries and has significantly influenced cultural attitudes towards daughters.

President Pranab Mukherjee launched an application for the campaign, describing the app as an innovative concept and an act of gentle persuasion, Mukherjee congratulated Jaglan for his efforts in initiating the campaign in Haryana.

=== Daughter’s nameplate (2015) ===
Jaglan launched the "Digital India with Laado" campaign in 2015, aimed at replacing the names of family heads on nameplates with their daughters' names.

As part of this initiative, village panchayat representatives visited each household to install nameplates that displayed the name of the daughter, accompanied by the tagline "Digital India With Laado."

Jaglan began the campaign by replacing his own name with that of his daughter.

The campaign was later relaunched in 2020 under Laado Swabhiman Utsav on a bigger level, especially in the region of Hisar and Mewat.

He also organised sports competitions for girls, awarding a kilogram of ghee as a prize, bringing focus to women's nutrition.

=== The Period Chart Campaign(2019) ===
Period Chart Campaign is a movement aimed at normalising menstruation and reducing stigma. The initiative was inspired by Jaglan’s discussions with his daughters about menstruation.

Recognising the need for open dialogue, Jaglan consulted with doctors and gathered information on the challenges women face during their menstrual cycles. This led to the creation of period charts in 2019.

The campaign promotes displaying period charts with dates and duration in households, encouraging transparency and fostering support from male family members during menstruation.

The charts first came up in some villages in Nuh and Jind districts of Haryana and later spread to seven Indian states with more than a thousand women participants.

== Rural development initiatives ==
Jaglan’s rural development initiatives include the establishment of India's first hi-tech gram panchayat, the implementation of online RTI, the opening of a library within the gram panchayat, and advocacy for women's and children's rights.

He is a founder of the Bibipur Model, a program aimed at promoting gender equality and enhancing the socio-economic conditions of women in rural India.

In December 2024, Jaglan launched the AI Friendly Panchayat campaign, where Artificial intelligence is used to train gram panchayats in various tasks.

== Personal life ==
Jaglan is married to Deepa Dhull, the couple has two daughters Nandini and Yachika.

== Awards and honours ==
- ₹1 Crore prize from the Chief Minister of Haryana in recognition of work on gender sensitization in Haryana (2012).
- Rashtriya Gaurav Gram Sabha Puruskar along with the cash prize of ₹10 lakhs in 2013.
- Rajiv Gandhi panchayat Sashaktikaran Abhiyaan Puruskar along with the cash prize of ₹15 lakhs in 2014.

It was the first time any panchayat received these awards from the Ministry of Panchayati Raj, Government of India.

== In popular culture ==
Son Rise, a Hindi-language documentary film directed by Vibha Bakshi, that is based on Jaglan’s role in women empowerment and the welfare of girl child was released in 2019. The film received multiple accolades, including the National Film Award for Best Non-Feature Film at 66th National Film Awards.

Son Rise was selected as the opening film at Indian Panorama, at 50th International Film Festival of India(IFFI) and was awarded the Best Documentary at the New York Indian Film Festival.

Abha Sahgal and Sutapa Mukherjee's book Skypath English Series Textbook Class 08 contains a chapter based on the works and contributions of Jaglan, which is included in the syllabus of class 8 in CBSE (Central Board of Secondary Education) schools.

== Media image ==
Jaglan has received significant media attention for his advocacy of gender equality and women's empowerment in India.

His "Selfie with Daughter" campaign has been featured in outlets like The New York Times, which highlighted his challenge to patriarchal norms, and the South China Morning Post, noting his efforts against female foeticide. Additionally, The Guardian and Vanity Fair covered his mission to combat sexist language.

Nationally, he has been recognized by Hindustan Times and Indian Express for promoting the girl child and supporting menstrual health management in rural communities, reflecting his commitment to empowering women and girls across India.

== Controversies ==
In 2015, Jaglan got suspended by Jind Deputy commissioner (DC) for alleged irregularities in the panchayat's functioning. It was alleged that he used government funds to install submersible tubewell at his friend's private residence rather than at a common place.

The suspension was later stayed by Punjab and Haryana High Court.
