= Family Party =

Family Party may refer to:

- The Family Party, a defunct Christian political party in New Zealand
- Family Party of Germany
- Family Coalition Party of Ontario
- Working Families Party, a minor political party in the United States founded in New York in 1998
- "Family Party" (song), a song by Kyary Pamyu Pamyu
- Family Party (film), a feature film written and directed by Pari Mathur
- Family Party: 30 Great Games Obstacle Arcade, a party video game on Wii U

== See also ==
- Family First Party
- Family First Party (2021), another Australian political party unrelated to the former party of the same name
