= Vibha Bakshi =

Indian filmmaker and journalist

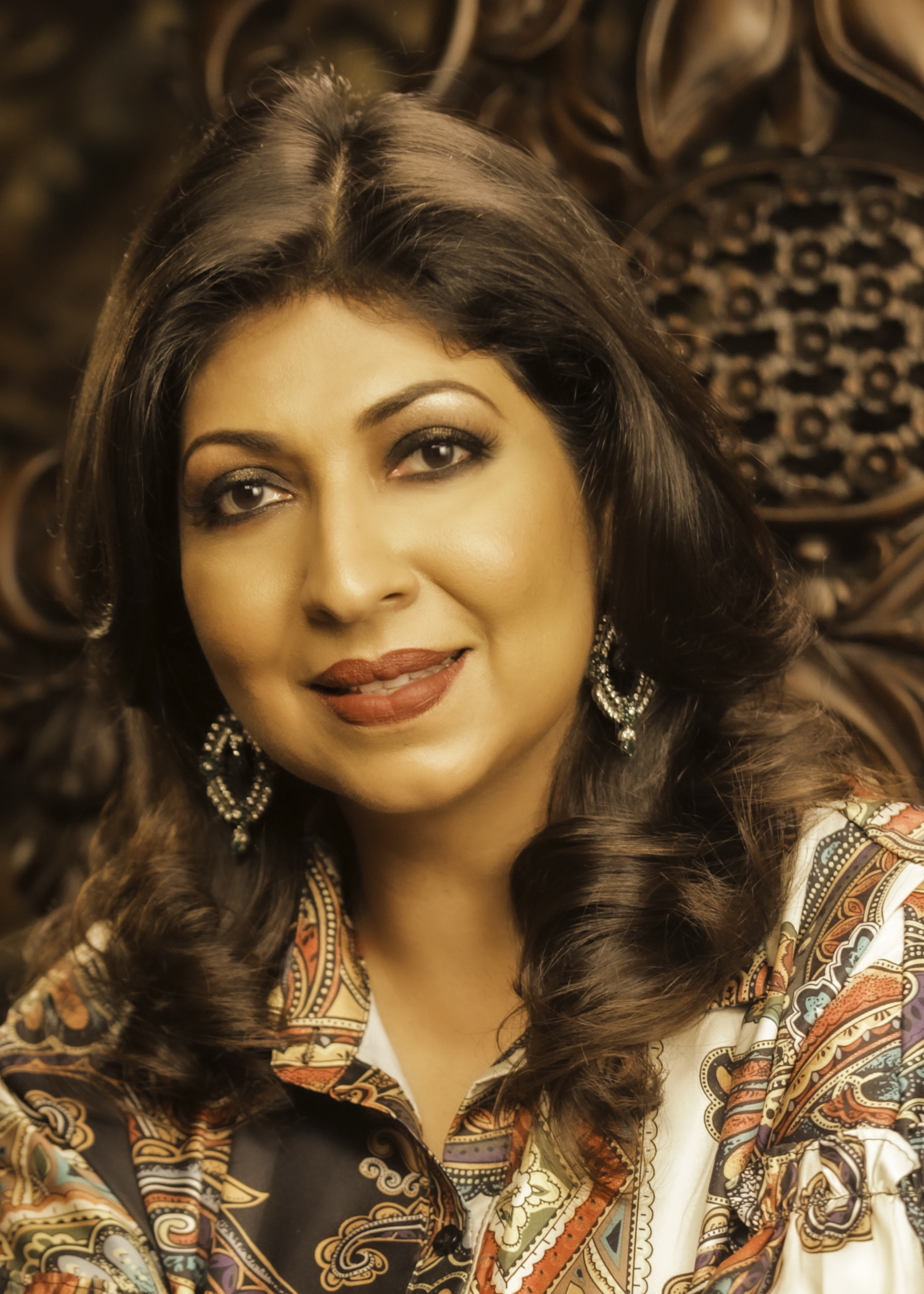
- Bakshi in 2018
- Born: 23 September 1970 (age 56); Mumbai, Maharashtra, India
- Education: Bachelor of Science degree
- Alma mater: Boston University; St Xaviers College, Mumbai; Convent of Jesus and Mary
- Occupation: Filmmaker
- Known for: Daughters of Mother India; Son Rise
- Awards: 4 National Film Awards

Vibha Bakshi (born 23 September 1970) is an Indian documentary filmmaker, former broadcast journalist, and the founder of Responsible Films. Much of her work examines gender inequality, gender-based violence, and institutional responses to social injustice. She is best known for the documentaries Daughters of Mother India (2015) and Son Rise (2019), both of which received National Film Awards from the Government of India, the highest recognition in Indian cinema, in multiple categories.

Bakshi has won four National Film Awards across directing and producing categories. Daughters of Mother India won the National Film Award for Best Film on Social Issues and was named the Most Awarded Social Campaign in the World by the Global Creative Index in 2017. Son Rise received the National Film Award for Best Non-Feature Film and Best Editing (Non-Feature) and was later selected by UN Women as part of the global HeForShe campaign.

Her films have been used in institutional and educational contexts, including police sensitisation programmes and school curricula in India. They have also been screened at academic institutions, international forums, and public-policy events in India and abroad, including United Nations–affiliated programmes and Expo 2020 Dubai.

In 2018, Bakshi was awarded an Honorary Doctor of Humane Letters by Boston University in recognition of her contributions to journalism and documentary filmmaking, alongside congressman and civil rights leader John Lewis. She has also participated in academic and public discussions on media ethics, gender justice, and the role of documentary cinema in social change.

== Early life and education ==
Vibha Bakshi was born on 23 September 1970 in Mumbai, Maharashtra, India. She was raised in a family with interests in business and literature. Her father, Ved Chhabra, is a businessman recognized by Forbes as one of the top 100 business leaders in the Middle East in 2018, while her mother, Geeta Chhabra, is a businesswoman and writer; both parents were featured in the 50 Legends list of Indian business leaders in the UAE. Bakshi attended the Convent of Jesus and Mary and St. Xavier's College in Mumbai. She later moved to the United States to pursue undergraduate studies in journalism and broadcasting. In 1993, she graduated from Boston University with a Bachelor of Science degree in communication. She subsequently completed a diploma course in broadcasting at New York University in 1999.

== Career ==
=== Journalism and early media work ===
Bakshi began her career in broadcast journalism in Mumbai. She worked with Plus Channel before later joining CNBC India as part of the channel's founding team. During this period, she worked in television news and current affairs, including reporting, production, and broadcast storytelling. Her early work in journalism later informed her approach to long-form documentary filmmaking, particularly on social and institutional issues.

=== Transition to documentary filmmaking ===
In the early 2000s, Bakshi moved from broadcast journalism into documentary and factual filmmaking. In 2004, she collaborated as a co-producer with Academy Award winning filmmaker Maryann DeLeo on social-issue projects. Their work included Terror at Home (2005), produced for Lifetime Television, which examined domestic violence and formed part of a United States government–led, Emmy Award–winning campaign to stop violence against women, and Too Hot NOT to Handle (2006), an HBO documentary addressing global warming. During this period, Bakshi founded Responsible Films, under which she began producing and directing documentaries focused on gender inequality, gender-based violence, and social reform.

=== Commissioned and institutional work ===
Alongside her independent documentaries, Bakshi has also directed and produced commissioned films. These projects were undertaken for public institutions and private organisations. Her work includes short documentary films for Taj Hotels, featuring heritage properties such as Falaknuma Palace, Taj Lake Palace in Udaipur, Umaid Bhawan Palace, and Rambagh Palace in Jaipur.

She also directed a film for the Tata Medical Centre in Kolkata, a philanthropic healthcare initiative funded by Tata Trusts. The film was broadcast across multiple television channels in India in English and several regional languages as part of a public awareness campaign. In 2015, Bakshi directed and produced a women's safety awareness campaign for the Mumbai Police. The campaign focused on sensitisation and public engagement around issues of gender-based violence and was recognised by the Government of Maharashtra, with Bakshi being felicitated by the then Chief Minister, Devendra Fadnavis.

=== Daughters of Mother India ===
Bakshi's film Daughters of Mother India, won the 62nd National Film Awards in 2015 for Best Film on Social Issues. As director and producer, she received two awards from the President of India, Pranab Mukherjee. The National Film Awards Jury cited the film for its examination of rape and gender-based violence in India. The documentary had a prime-time simulcast release across Viacom18's ten television channels in eight languages, which was described at the time as a first for an Indian documentary.

In 2017, Daughters of Mother India was recognised by the Global Creative Index as the most awarded social-impact campaign in the world. The film was nominated at the Cannes Glass Lions award for 'Media Advocacy that Changed the World'. It was screened for more than 150,000 officers of the Indian Police Force as part of gender-sensitisation and training programmes to address gender-related crimes and was incorporated into the curriculum of over 200 schools in Maharashtra.

The film was also selected as the opening film at the Indian Panorama during the 46th International Film Festival of India (IFFI), held in November 2015 in Goa. The festival was hosted by the Ministry of Information and Broadcasting and the Directorate of Film Festivals.

=== Son Rise ===
Son Rise follows men who are fighting patriarchy and challenging male dominance in the state of Haryana. Bakshi was awarded the 66th National Film Awards for Best Film Non-Feature as both director and producer, the highest honour for cinema in the country. The film also won Best Editing Non-Feature. In 2021, Son Rise was selected by United Nations, to be screened as part of UN Women's global HeForShe campaign across 71 countries. The film was unveiled by United Nations Under-Secretary-General Phumzile Mlambo-Ngcuka followed by screenings by Consulates and Embassies of the World in India. One of the film's central subjects, social reformer Sunil Jaglan, was later included in the Central Board of Secondary Education (CBSE) curriculum for his work on gender justice and civic engagement.

The documentary opened the inaugural Bloomberg Equality Summit in Mumbai, the first edition of the summit held in Asia. It was also for the Indian Panorama section at the 50th International Film Festival of India in Goa.

Son Rise won the Jury Award for Best Documentary at the Mumbai International Film Festival and Best Documentary at the New York Indian Film Festival.

The film was screened at World Expo 2020, Dubai's largest venue, Jubilee stage. The screening was followed by a call of action by 50 countries who pledged for gender equality - led by United Nations, New Zealand, India and the Women’s Pavilion at Expo 2020. The event was attended by the cultural figures, diplomatic community, business leaders, academics and change-makers to spotlight a shared human rights and women’s rights issue — violence against women.

== Public engagement ==
Bakshi's work has been used in academic, institutional, and policy-related contexts in discussions on gender justice and media responsibility. Her documentaries have also been used in educational and training settings beyond their initial cinematic release.

=== Academic and policy forums ===
Her films have been discussed at universities in India and internationally. In 2019, the Jerome A. Chazen Institute for Global Business at Columbia University hosted a symposium on Daughters of Mother India, examining the film in relation to media accountability and governance. In 2024, Vibha spoke at the India Harvard Conference, Harvard University, the biggest India focussed conference in US. At the Harvard Kennedy School, her documentary Son Rise opened the Women in Power Conference, and she delivered the opening address. She also delivered lectures (key notes) at Yale University and the University of Notre Dame, addressing themes including gender equality, documentary narrative, and judicial reform. In 2025, she appeared at the Nand & Jeet Khemka Distinguished Speaker Forum at Columbia Business School, where the discussion focused on narrative media and social-impact investment.

=== Multilateral and institutional impact ===
Bakshi's films have been used by United Nations agencies as part of gender-equality and advocacy initiatives. During the United Nations' 16 Days of Activism against Gender-based Violence in 2020, she addressed agencies including the Food and Agriculture Organization and the World Food Programme on the gendered socio-economic impacts of the COVID-19 pandemic.

In India, Daughters of Mother India has been used in institutional training programmes, including police sensitisation initiatives, and has been incorporated into school curricula in Maharashtra.

== Awards and nominations ==
In 2018, Bakshi was awarded the Honorary Doctor of Humane Letters from her alma mater Boston University for her work as a journalist and filmmaker. She was the commencement speaker at Boston University's School of Communications. Bakshi received the Vogue India Women of the Year Award in 2021 for her films contributing to gender equality and gender justice. She was also named to the PRovoke Media Innovator 25 Asia-Pacific list in recognition of her work in narrative-driven social impact.

Year	Award	Category	Work	Result	Ref(s)
2015	62nd National Film Awards	Best Film on Social Issues	Daughters of Mother India	Won	
2016	The Cannes Glass Lions award	Media Advocacy	Daughters of Mother India	Nominated	
2016	New York Indian Film Festival	Best documentary	Daughters of Mother India	Won	
2016	CAM International Film Festival	Documentary Film category	Daughters of Mother India	Won	
2016	New Zee Indian Women Awards	Entertainment	Daughters of Mother India	Won	
2016	Gold Stevie	PR Campaign of The Year	Daughters of Mother India	Won	
2016	The Cannes Glass Lions award	Crisis and Urgency PR	Daughters of Mother India	Nominated	
2016	SABRE Awards South Asia	Public Affairs & Government Relations	Daughters of Mother India	Won	
2017	Mumbrella Asia Awards	Bravery category	Daughters of Mother India	Won	
2017	Spikes Asia Awards	Crisis Communication & Issue Management	Daughters of Mother India	Won	
2017	Global Creative Index	Most awarded PR Campaign in the world	Daughters of Mother India	Won	
2019	66th National Film Awards	Best Film Non-Feature	Son Rise	Won	
2019	66th National Film Awards	Best Editing Non-Feature	Son Rise	Won	
2020	MIFF Awards	Best Documentary Film	Son Rise	Won	
2020	Indian Panorama Award (International Film Festival of India)	Best Documentary Film	Son Rise	Won	
2020	New York Indian Film Festival	Best Documentary Film	Son Rise	Won	
2020	PRWeek Global Awards	Best Campaign in Asia Pacific & Issues & Crisis	Son Rise	Won	

== Personal life ==
Bakshi is married to Vishal Bakshi, former Goldman Sachs Head Private Equity India and now founder of Private Equity firm Avatar Growth Capital Partners. The couple has two boys, Varun and Vir.
