= Son Rise =

2019 Indian documentary film

- Directed by: Vibha Bakshi
- Produced by: Vibha Bakshi
- Cinematography: Attar Singh Saini
- Edited by: Hemanti Sarkar
- Release date: 19 February 2019
- Running time: 49 minutes
- Country: India
- Languages: Hindi, English

Son Rise is a 2019 Indian Hindi-language documentary film directed and produced by Vibha Bakshi. The film is set in Haryana, infamous for its strongly embedded patriarchy. Yet, from this unlikeliest place, Vibha Bakshi's Son Rise follows those men who are trying to break the shackles of patriarchy and fight for women's rights.

Son Rise has been a recipient of numerous accolades, including the National Film Award for Best Non-Feature Film awarded to Vibha Bakshi as both director and producer and the National Film Award for Best Non-Feature Film Editing, awarded to Hemanti Sarkar, at 66th National Film Awards. The National Award ceremony was followed by a reception hosted by President of India Ram Nath Kovind at Rashtrapati Bhavan.

Son Rise has been selected to be showcased as part of United Nations global HeForShe movement across 71 countries.

Son Rise was selected as the opening film at Indian Panorama, at 50th International Film Festival of India (IFFI) and was awarded the Best Documentary at the New York Indian Film Festival and the Jury Award for Best Documentary at the Mumbai International Film Festival. The MIFF jury citation said "A strong and powerful film that gives us a fresh perspective in combating India's crisis on gender inequality with a clear potential for impacting social change".

== Synopsis ==
The documentary is filmed in Haryana which borders the capital, New Delhi. The state's deep-rooted patriarchal norms have led to illegal yet rampant gender-selective abortions resulting in the nearly complete absence of girls in the state's villages. This, in turn, has led to bride buying/bride kidnapping traffic and provoked an unprecedented number of crimes against women. While shedding light on these prevalent issues, the film focuses on ordinary men from patriarchal rural India who have emerged as gender rights heroes.

=== People featured ===
The documentary features Jitender Chattar, a farmer who in a traditional marriage arranged by parents defies society by marrying Kusam, who was gang-raped by 8 men. The film follows Jitender's unshakeable resolve to secure justice for his wife.

The film also follows Sunil Jaglan, a village chief, and father of two daughters, who is fighting for the inclusion of women in the male-dominated areas of local governance despite detractors filing false lawsuits against him.

Also featured in the documentary is Baljit Singh, the Chief of the largest and most influential rural clan in India who is daring to challenge, the age-old tradition of male dominance, at the cost of his own authority and popularity.

== United Nations Partnership ==
The film was unveiled in February 2019 at Royal Opera House (Mumbai) by United Nations Under-Secretary-General Phumzile Mlambo-Ngcuka and is now showcased as part of United Nations's global HeForShe movement.

Prior to the premiere of the film, Son Rise was featured in the Hindustan Times 360 degrees campaign series "Let's Talk About It", a first for a documentary in India.

== Production ==
The documentary was shot in Haryana over a period of 2 years. The film team succeeded in getting men from the male-dominated panchayats (village councils) to speak up on gender justice and at the same time question men of the most patriarchal state on gender rights. In the process, Vibha Bakshi and her team identified and followed the legal, and societal battles of Kusam, a gang rape survivor, and her husband in their fight for justice.

== Release ==
=== Impact ===
In April 2019, all Consuls General of the world in Mumbai jointly hosted the special screening of Son Rise at the National Museum of Indian Cinema, Mumbai. Subsequently, for the International Day of the Girl Child, in October 2019. the Diplomatic Corps in Delhi - comprising Ambassadors and High Commissioners of 15 Missions - screened Son Rise and pledged their support for gender equality. The screening was held at the historic Siri Fort in New Delhi and opened by the Chairperson of The National Commission for Women in India, Rekha Sharma, and UN Women Deputy Head, Nishtha Satyam.

The teaser of Son Rise was unveiled at the Spikes Asia Awards, Singapore, in September 2019, followed by a keynote address by Bakshi, director and producer of Son Rise at the IPG Women leadership conference. The conference was hosted by Micheal Roth, Chairman of IPG - the world's largest organizations of advertising and marketing services.

In September 2019, Son Rise was screened for students of 100 colleges in Mumbai followed by workshops conducted by the National Service Scheme (NSS) of Mumbai University. The film is being screened across schools and universities in India to gender sensitize the youth.

Son Rise kicked off the inaugural Bloomberg Equality Summit in Mumbai, the first in Asia, in October 2019. The screening was followed by the activation of the UN's HeForShe movement in India.

NASSCOM, India's chamber of commerce for the Tech Industry, along with 75 Tech leaders, jointly screened Son Rise in October 2019.

As part of UN's global16 days of Activism, in November 2019, the leadership of Haryana Police organized screenings of Son Rise across the force to gender sensitize the police.

In January 2020, Son Rise had a special screening at the Women in Design 2020 International Conference where over 500 architects and design professionals, from across five continents, came together in Mumbai, India. YPO, the Global Leadership Community of Chief Executives, screened Son Rise in January 2020 to its group of YPO members followed by a panel discussion on making men equal partners for a gender-equal world.

For International Women's Day, a special screening of Son Rise was organised for the Punjab Police to initiate a Public-Police partnership for women safety. This was organised by Consulate of Canada-Chandigarh, GNDU and Majha House. Dr Sukhchain Singh Gill, Commissioner of Police Amritsar and Shivdular Singh Dhillon, District Commissioner, Amritsar addressed the audience.

Ministry of External Affairs has selected Son Rise to represent India at the Shanghai Cooperation Organization Summit in Dushanbe, Tajikistan.

Son Rise was recently screened at World Expo 2020, Dubai's largest venue, Jubilee stage - to a standing ovation. The screening was followed by a call of action by 50 countries who pledged for gender equality - led by United Nations, New Zealand, India and the Women's Pavilion at Expo 2020. The event was attended by distinguished guests from all walks of life including the cultural figures, diplomatic community, business leaders, academics and change-makers to spotlight a shared human rights and women's rights issue — violence against women.

== Awards and nominations ==
| Year | Award | Category | Work | Result | Notes(s) |
|---|---|---|---|---|---|
| 2019 | 66th National Film Awards | Best Film Non-Feature | Son Rise | Won | |
| 2019 | 66th National Film Awards | Best Editing Non-Feature | Son Rise | Won | |
| 2020 | MIFF Awards | Best Documentary Film | Son Rise | Won | |
