= Lado Panchayat =

Indian social movement

- Country: India
- Inception: 2019
- Founder: Sunil Jaglan
- Motive: Women's empowerment

Lado Panchayat is a women-led community initiative in Haryana, India, focused on empowering women and girls through advocacy, education, and community governance. Originating in Bibipur village, Jind district, it serves as a platform for rural women to address social issues such as child marriage, gender-based violence, and access to education.

It emerged as an alternative to the traditionally male-dominated Khap Panchayats, which have historically held significant influence in rural areas of North India.

== History ==
Lado Panchayat was established in Bibipur, Haryana, by former sarpanch Sunil Jaglan, with the first meeting held in 2019. The initiative emerged as a response to patriarchal norms, aiming to amplify women’s voices in rural governance. Named “Lado” (meaning “beloved daughter” in Hindi), it emphasizes the empowerment of girls and women in traditionally male-dominated spaces.

== Activities and impact ==
Lado Panchayat organizes meetings where women and girls discuss and advocate for solutions to community issues. In 2021, it gained attention for campaigning to raise the legal marriage age for girls from 19 to 21, a proposal later supported by the Indian government. The initiative has also addressed abusive language, demanding stricter laws against casteist and derogatory remarks, and promoted education for girls to combat early marriage and gender inequality.

The platform has been recognized for challenging the “sarpanch pati” phenomenon, where male relatives act as proxy leaders for elected women in panchayats. By fostering leadership and decision-making skills, Lado Panchayat aligns with broader efforts to strengthen women’s roles in Panchayati Raj institutions. In 2022, its work was presented to an Indian parliamentary committee, highlighting its influence on national policy discussions.

== Recognition ==
Lado Panchayat has been covered by national and international media, including The Hindu, The Times of India, Hindustan Times, and Voice of America, for its role in women’s empowerment. Its efforts to reshape rural gender norms have been noted as part of a broader movement for civic engagement in India.

== See also ==
- Women's empowerment
- Panchayati Raj
