= Naale Rajaa Koli Majaa =

Indian Film

- Theatrical release poster
- Directed by: Abhilash Shetty
- Written by: Abhilash Shetty
- Produced by: Abhilash Shetty
- Starring: Samrudhi Kundapura, Sanidhya Acharya, Radha Ramachandra, Prabhakar Kunder
- Cinematography: Swaroop Yashwanth
- Edited by: Abhilash Shetty
- Music by: M.R. Prahast
- Production company: Plan A Films
- Release dates: 4 December 2024 (Jogja-NETPAC); 9 May 2025 (India)
- Running time: 91 minutes
- Country: India
- Language: Kannada

Naale Rajaa Koli Majaa (English Title=Sunday Special) is a Kannada comedy drama film written, directed, and produced by Abhilash Shetty. The film follows an 11-year-old girl's quirky adventure to seek a forbidden chicken curry on Gandhi Jayanti, a day when meat sales are banned nationwide.

The film premiered at the 19th Jogja-NETPAC Asian Film Festival on 4 December 2024, and had a theatrical release in India on 9 May 2025.

And had its New York premiere at the 25th New York Indian Film Festival on 22 June 2025.

== Synopsis ==
Sneha is an 11-year-old schoolgirl residing in a small town and has a deep love for chicken dishes. Every Sunday, her family cooks her favorite chicken dish. Anticipating the same delight on a particular Sunday coinciding with Gandhi Jayanthi, Sneha learns about the nationwide prohibition on meat consumption as a gesture of non-violence. Sneha goes on a quirky adventure pursuing a forbidden chicken curry, challenging societal norms, and encountering unforeseen twists.

== Cast ==
The film casts:

- Samrudhi Kundapura as Sneha
- Sanidhya Acharya as Sophia
- Radha Ramachandra as Vanaja
- Prabhakar Kunder as Mahabala Shetty
- Ganesh Mogaveera as Manja

== Release ==
=== Theatrical ===
The film was released in cinemas across Karnataka on 9 May 2025, following its film festival run.

=== Home media ===
Naale Rajaa Koli Majaa was released on Amazon Prime Video in India on 13 June 2025, and internationally on 16 September 2025 as Sunday Special. The film later saw a DVD release across the United States in December 2025.

== Reception ==
The Times of India gave 3.5 stars out of 5 saying "a deliciously personal adventure that leaves you smiling and hungry". The Hindu praised the film and said, "Director Abhilash Shetty's sophomore effort is a charming film that balances gentle humour with socio-political commentary." Deccan Herald gave 3.5 stars and praised the film for its well-crafted screenplay, noting that "Abhilash weaves this in a well-written screenplay. There's never a dull moment. By the end of the film, you're craving for a meal of koli curry yourself." Asian Movie Pulse gave the film a positive review, calling it a "Charming and likeable tale". French magazine KinoCulture Montreal gave 3.5 stars out of 5 saying "La nostalgie comme repère moral". Vague Visages described the film as "never a dull moment". OTTplay awarded the film 3.5 stars, describing it as a "sweet and funny tale."

== Awards and nominations ==
Award	Category	Recipient	Result
New York Indian Film Festival	Best Screenplay	Abhilash Shetty	Nominated
19th Jogja-NETPAC Asian Film Festival	Asian Perspectives	Abhilash Shetty	Nominated
India Film Festival Of Alberta	Best Film	Abhilash Shetty	Nominated
Asian Pop-up Cinema	Audience Award	Abhilash Shetty; Plan A Films	Nominated
Bucharest Best Comedy Film Festival	Best Film	Abhilash Shetty; Plan A Films	Nominated
