= Period Chart Campaign =

Indian social movement

- Native name: पीरियड चार्ट मुहिम
- Date: 2019
- Location: India
- Theme: Feminine hygiene
- Motive: Open discussions about menstruation
- Patron: Sunil Jaglan

The Period Chart Campaign is an Indian social movement aimed at normalising menstruation and reducing stigma. Launched by social activist Sunil Jaglan in 2019, the campaign encourages open discussions about menstruation.

== History ==
The movement was inspired by Jaglan’s discussions with his daughters about menstruation, during which he recognised the need for open dialogue on the subject.

Jaglan gathered information from doctors, leading to the creation of period charts in 2019. These charts display the dates and duration of menstrual cycles and aimed to promote transparency and support from male family members.

With the period chart on the wall, both the men and women in the family know that the girl’s period is due. It is to start a discussion and normalise periods within the family

— Sunil Jaglan

== Goal ==
The movement was launched with an aim to dispel myths surrounding menstrual hygiene.

The Period Chart is a calendar-style chart that allows women in the household to write their names, months, and dates to keep track of their menstrual cycles. It also helps monitor any changes in the timing of their periods over time.

The initiative encourages families to display the chart on the walls of their homes with the goal to foster open conversations about a topic that is often stigmatised in Indian households.

== Impact ==
Originally launched in villages in Nuh and Jind districts of Haryana, the campaign has expanded to seven Indian states, involving over a thousand women participants.

The campaign received support from UN Women to implement the initiative in Nepal.

== In popular culture ==
A short film titled "Period Chart," directed by M. Taufik and starring Rahul Kumar, was released in 2021, inspired by and named after the campaign.
