= Bibipur Model =

Social program in Haryana, India

- Country: India
- Inception: 2016
- Founder: Sunil Jaglan
- Motive: Women's empowerment
- Full name: Bibipur Model of Women Empowerment and Village Development

Bibipur Model of Women Empowerment and Village Development, commonly known as the Bibipur Model, is a program aimed at promoting gender equality and enhancing the socio-economic conditions of women in rural India.

It was introduced by Sunil Jaglan, a former sarpanch of Bibipur village in 2016, and gained national recognition when it was adopted in 2017 by the former President of India Pranab Mukherjee for implementation in 100 villages across Haryana.

== Background ==
The Bibipur Model was conceived as a response to the pervasive gender discrimination and societal biases prevalent in rural India. The initiative aims to empower women and promote gender equality through various strategies, including community engagement and awareness campaigns.

== Area of work ==
The model aims to empower women by encouraging them to participate in decision-making and governance. It seeks to develop villages by addressing issues like female foeticide, education, health, and property rights. The model also aims to fight gender bias by encouraging women to attend meetings and speak up about their concerns, and works to ban abusive slurs against women by encouraging open discussions in the gram sabha.

== Implementation ==
- In 2017, President Pranab Mukherjee adopted 100 villages in Haryana and asked Jaglan to help implement the Bibipur model in those villages.
