= Selfie With Daughter =

Indian social media campaign

- Date: June 9, 2015
- Location: India
- Theme: Gender equality
- Motive: Awareness about the importance of daughters in society.
- Patron: Sunil Jaglan
- Website: selfiewithdaughter.org

The Selfie With Daughter campaign is an initiative aimed at promoting the importance of daughters and raising awareness about gender equality. Launched by social activist Sunil Jaglan, the campaign encourages parents to take selfies with their daughters and share them on social media to celebrate the value of girls and to challenge societal norms that may devalue female children. International Selfie With Daughter Day is observed on 9 June every year. The campaign witnessed support from prominent leaders including the Indian President Pranab Mukherjee and Prime Minister Narendra Modi.

The campaign later adopted additional objectives including the education of girls in India and the promotion of their economic empowerment. It frequently highlights issues such as gender discrimination, the necessity of girls' education, and the importance of supporting women's rights. By sharing these selfies, participants help create a positive narrative around having daughters and contribute to changing perceptions about gender in society.

The campaign has spread to more than 70 countries.

== History ==
The campaign was started by Sunil Jaglan, a sarpanch of Bibipur village in Jind District of Haryana, on 9 June 2015. It was later promoted by Prime Minister Narendra Modi through Mann Ki Baat, a radio program.

Notable milestones include the launch of the Selfie With Daughter Online Museum on 9 June 2016 which was started by Anil Vij.

On 9 June 2017 an app about the campaign was launched by Pranab Mukherjee to increase awareness about female foeticide in India.

In 2018, a dedicated website providing information on women's rights was established.

In 2019, an all-woman selfie campaign was launched that focused on single mothers. The campaign saw a lot of participation from Northeast India.

The campaign further expanded in 2019 to support single women and was acknowledged in various reports, including the Economic Survey of India.

In 2021, it was launched in Nepal in partnership with the Nepal Internet Foundation.

Pranab Mukherjee also referred to the campaign as a global movement against female foeticide and sex selection.

On April 30, 2023, Modi highlighted the campaign during the 100th episode of Mann Ki Baat.

The campaign continues to evolve, with 2023 Selfie With Daughter (SWD) Day focusing on handicapped girls and 2024 SWD Day dedicated to first-time female voters, reinforcing its commitment to gender empowerment.

== Impact ==
According to a report published by the Indian government, the campaign was effective due to its use of failure bias. It informed the public about prevailing social norms and illustrated how thousands of others were adhering to these norms.

As reported by The SDG Communicator, the campaign's website featured over 100,000 photos, with 27,000 families participating by 2019.

According to the Hindustan Times, the campaign has spread to over 70 countries in the world.

== Recognition by Narendra Modi ==
The campaign had been mentioned multiple times by the Prime Minister during his Mann Ki Baat programmes and speeches.

In his broadcast at All India Radio on 28 June 2015, he stated:

I liked this idea, and that too for a special reason. In Haryana, the number of girls in comparison to boys is dismally low. Around another 100 districts in the country have a similar dismal situation of skewed sex ratio. But it is the worst in Haryana. In that very same Haryana, if a Sarpanch of a small indistinct village lends this meaning to the “Beti Bachao Beti Padhao” programme, then I certainly get overwhelmed.

— Narendra Modi

and urged citizens to follow the trend by posting a selfie with their daughters.

In another broadcast on 20th September 2015, he described the campaign as a movement and a silent revolution.

I had just casually mentioned about selfie with daughter and what a movement it became. The whole world was amazed. Lakhs of people, perhaps from all the countries of the world posted a selfie with their daughters. What dignity did it lend to our daughters? Anyone who clicked this selfie not only boosted their daughter’s confidence but also made a commitment to them. Whosoever saw it realized that they will now have to give up the indifferent attitude towards daughters. This was a kind of a silent revolution.

— Narendra Modi

During a gathering of the Indian diaspora at Wembley Stadium in London on November 14, 2015, Modi referred to the "Selfie With Daughter" campaign as an "international movement."

I was surprised that it had become interest of everybody's mobile in the entire world. It had become a 'jan andolan' (movement). They may be top politicians of the world, senior personalities of education sector or economic sector, everybody circulated selfie with their daughter on their mobile phones.

— Narendra Modi

Modi highlighted how the concept was introduced by a sarpanch from a small village, expressing his appreciation for its widespread impact. He concluded by emphasising that the campaign had fostered pride among mothers and daughters alike.

During a meeting with Silicon Valley CEOs in San Jose, California on November 27, 2015, Modi described the initiative as an international movement. He highlighted it as "an initiative by a father in Haryana to draw attention to the girl child" that "became an international movement."

Three years later, In November 2018, he continued to talk about the campaign in his program.

Who would have imagined that a small campaign “selfie with daughter”starting from a small village in Haryana would spread not only throughout the country but also across other countries as well.

— Narendra Modi

On 30 April 2023, the 100th episode of the program was broadcast live from the United Nations headquarters in New York. During the broadcast, Modi praised the campaign, noting that these efforts have led to an improved gender ratio in Haryana.

The 'Selfie with Daughter' campaign impressed me a lot and I mentioned it in my episode. Soon the 'Selfie with Daughter' campaign went global. The purpose of this campaign was to make people understand the importance of daughters in life

— Narendra Modi
