= Family Party (film) =

- Directed by: Pari Mathur
- Written by: Pari Mathur
- Produced by: Felix Ding; Rishi Kumar; Emily Barbera
- Cinematography: Richie Yau
- Edited by: Sara Newens
- Music by: Chris and JJ; Eyes on the Shore
- Release date: October 2015
- Running time: 52 min
- Country: United States
- Language: English
- Budget: $95,000

Family Party is a 2015 coming of age comedy written and directed by Pari Mathur. The film stars Jaya Prasad, Vishal Vaidya, Jai Ahuja, Rahul Nalamasu, and Hunter Milano who are group of teens that decide to sneak out of a family event and go to a local concert. The film was acquired and available to stream on Netflix from 2016 to 2017.

== Synopsis ==
High school senior, Nick gets forced by his parents to attend a boring family party instead of letting him to go a local summer concert with his baseball buddies. He meets a group of teens—including a girl named Arti—who are all stuck at the party too. They soon realize they all have tickets to the same concert and hash out a plan to sneak out. Their scheme falls apart when they're met with another jealous childhood friend, a missing diamond necklace, and a small religious ceremony put on by the adults.

== Production ==
Director Pari Mathur completed the script in 2009. The cast was auditioned from the Harker School and Naatak theater group. Principal photography started in August 2013 in Oakland and San Jose, California. Additional scenes were also shot around Saratoga, Pleasanton, and Pacifica.

Family Party was accepted and premiered at the New York Indian Film Festival in 2015. The film was released in October 2015 on iTunes, Google Play, Amazon, and Vudu. It was acquired by Netflix and became available to stream worldwide in all English-speaking territories in early 2016 until March 2017.

== Cast ==
- Jaya Prasad as Arti
- Vishal Vaidya as Nick
- Jai Ahuja as Sahil
- Rahul Nalamasu as Sanjay
- Hunter Milano as Gary
- Shruti Tewari as Rani
- Rajiv Nema as Arjun
- Rashmi Rustagi as Heena
- Dhira Ramakrishnan as Neeta
- Pritesh Shah as Harry
- Karthik Hariharan as Dr. Gupta
- Nitin Deo as the Pundit
- Sareeka Malhotra as Poonum
- Sanjay Pachpande as Vishnu
- Puneet as Gaurav

== Accolades ==
Family Party premiered at the New York Indian Film Festival 2015.

== Release ==
Family Party was released on iTunes, Google Play, Amazon, and Vudu in October 2015. The film was acquired by Netflix and was available to stream in all English-speaking territories worldwide from 2016 to 2017.

== Music ==
The teens in the film are all trying to go to an Eyes on the Shore concert, an actual bay area band, who provided the song for the end credits called “Jigsaw”.
