= Abhilash Shetty =

Film director

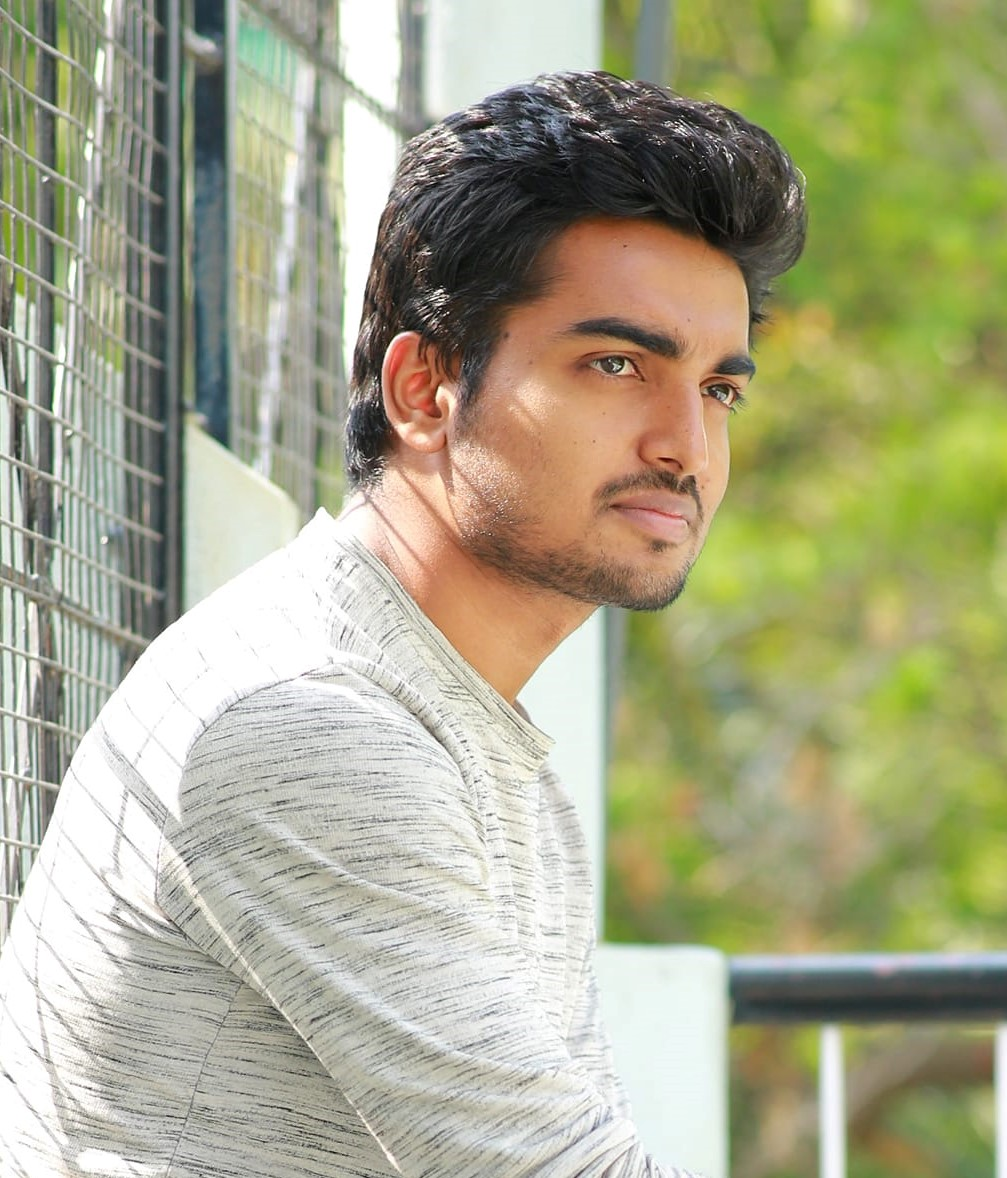
- Born: Shimoga, Karnataka, India
- Occupations: Director; Screenwriter; Actor
- Years active: 2020–present

Abhilash Shetty (born 3 September 1996) is an Indian filmmaker, screenwriter, and actor. He made a remarkable directorial debut with the critically acclaimed Kannada film Koli Taal. followed by Naale Rajaa Koli Majaa, both films received widespread praise and were showcased at prestigious international film festivals.

== Early life ==
Shetty was born in Shimoga, Karnataka, into a Kannada speaking Bunt family. He completed his schooling at Jawahar Navodaya Vidyalaya, Shimoga, a prestigious boarding school. After earning his degree, he worked as a financial analyst for two years at Capgemini in Bengaluru. He eventually left his corporate career to pursue filmmaking.

== Career ==
Shetty started his filmmaking career by making short films, including Crony, Vinashi, and 2 Missed Calls. He wrote, directed, and edited his debut feature film, Koli Taal, in 2021.

He directed his sophomore feature, Naale Rajaa Koli Majaa, in 2024. The film garnered attention at various international film festivals before its theatrical release in India on May 9, 2025.

== Filmography ==
Year	Film	Director	Writer	Actor	Notes
2018	9 to 6	No	No	Yes	Short film
2019	2 Missed Calls	Yes	Yes	Yes	Short film
2021	Koli Taal	Yes	Yes	Yes	Debut feature film
2024	Naale Rajaa Koli Majaa	Yes	Yes	No	Also producer
2027	Ghattada Bhoota	Yes	Yes	Yes	Post-Production
