= Koli Taal =

- Theatrical Poster of Koli Taal
- Directed by: Abhilash Shetty
- Written by: Abhilash Shetty
- Produced by: Sachin Pattanshetty
- Starring: Radha Ramachandra, Prabhakar Kunder, Ganesh Mogaveera, Sharath Devadiga, Guruprasad Nairy
- Cinematography: Swaroop Yashwanth
- Edited by: Abhilash Shetty
- Production company: Gubbi Cinema
- Release dates: 4 June 2021 (New York Indian Film Festival); 27 May 2022 (India)
- Running time: 92 minutes
- Country: India
- Language: Kannada

Koli Taal (transl. The Chicken Curry) is an Indian Kannada satirical film written and directed by Abhilash Shetty. The story follows a determined grandfather who embarks on an adventurous quest to find a missing rooster, and serve the chicken curry for his grandson before he departs for town.

The film premiered at the 21st New York Indian Film Festival. It was then screened at various film festivals including the 18th Indian Film Festival of Stuttgart and 12th Indian Film Festival of Melbourne. It had its Indian premiere at Jio MAMI Mumbai Film Festival (Mumbai Academy of the Moving Image).

== Synopsis ==
Excited for their grandson’s visit, an elderly couple decides to cook his favorite chicken curry for dinner. But when the rooster mysteriously goes missing, Grandpa embarks on an unexpected adventure to find it and prepare the curry before his grandson must leave for town.

== Cast ==
- Radha Ramachandra as Vanaja
- Prabhakar Kunder as Mahabala Shetty
- Abhilash Shetty as Sumanth
- Ganesh Mogaveera as Manja
- Sharath Devadiga as Sathisha
- Guruprasad Nairy as Haala

== Release ==
=== Theatrical ===
Koli Taal got released in cinemas on May 27, 2022, after the film festivals run.

=== Home media ===
Koli Taal got released on the TVOD platform Apple TV on February 8, 2023. And had its digital release in India on JioCinema on June 10, 2023. The film later saw a DVD release across the United States in March 2025.

== Reception ==
French magazine KinoCulture Montreal gave 4 stars out of 5 saying "An original film that claims loud and clear that India is not limited to Bollywood".

The Times of India gave 3.5 stars out of 5 saying "A heartwarming tale filled with light-hearted moments"

Cinestaan gave the film 3 out of 4 stars and said that "the frames and objects in the film feel so real, so alive that you can almost smell and touch them".

Deccan Herald rated 3.5 out of 5 stars stating "Rooted & Refreshing".

Film Threat scored 7.5 out of 10 saying "a warm and humorous whodunnit involving a missing rooster essential to the titular dish."

Dallas Movie Screenings gave "A−" grade for the film and said "The film is completely filled with interesting regional customs based on their family living and their accustomed generations".

Film critic Anna M. M. Vetticad praised the film and quoted "It's hard to believe that Koli Taal is Abhilash Shetty's first film"

== Awards and nominations ==
Award	Category	Recipient	Result
New York Indian Film Festival	Best Screenplay	Abhilash Shetty	Nominated
Indian Film Festival Stuttgart	German Star of India	Abhilash Shetty	Nominated
Mumbai Film Festival (Mumbai Academy of the Moving Image)	Spotlight	Abhilash Shetty	Nominated
Indus Valley International Film Festival	Jury Prize for Best Screenplay	Abhilash Shetty	Won
Indian Film Festival of Melbourne	Beyond Bollywood	Abhilash Shetty	Nominated
Ottawa Indian Film Festival	Best Actor	Prabhakar Kunder	Won
Bucharest Best Comedy Film Festival	Best Film	Abhilash Shetty; Gubbi Cinema	Nominated
Jaffna International Cinema Festival	Best Debut Director	Abhilash Shetty	Nominated
