= Bibipur =

Village in Haryana, India

- Village
- Country: India
- State: Haryana
- District: Jind district

Government
  - Body: Panchayati raj

Population (2011)
  - Total: 4,888
- PIN code: 126102

Bibipur is a village and Gram Panchayat in Jind district of Haryana, India. It is situated 8km away from Jind, which is both district & sub-district headquarter of the village.

According to 2011 census of India information the location code or village code of Bibipur is 060122 and the Pin (Postal) code is 126102.

Bibipur village is known for the Bibipur Model and other women empowerment initiatives launched by a former sarpanch of the village Sunil Jaglan.

== Notable people ==
- Sunil Jaglan, social activist
- Deepa Dhull, social worker
