= New York Indian Film Festival =

Indian Film festival in New York

- Official logo
- Location: New York City, United States
- Founded: 2001
- Most recent: 2022
- Hosted by: Indo-American Arts Council
- Festival date: Opening: May 7, 2022; Closing: May 14, 2022
- Language: English
- Website: NYIFF 2022
- 23rd 21st

The New York Indian Film Festival (NYIFF) is an annual film festival that takes place in New York City, and screens films relating to India, the Indian Diaspora, and the work of Indian filmmakers. The festival began in November 2001 and was founded by Aroon Shivdasani and the Indo-American Arts Council. About 40 films are screened, including features films, shorts, documentaries, and animated films.

== History ==
The festival began in November 2001 as the Indo-American Arts Council Film Festival (IAAC). It was founded in response to the attacks of September 11, as a way to educate the community on Indian culture. The first festival took place at the Imagin Asian Theatre. Subsequent festivals have been hosted by Tribeca Cinemas, The Walter Read Theater at The Lincoln Center, Asia Society, Aicon Gallery, Cantor Film Center at New York University, and SVA Theaters. The opening night ceremony of the 2011 festival took place at the Paris Theater.

In 2007, the festival partnered with The Mahindra Group to help the festival grow and reach wider audiences. The festival also changed its name to The Mahindra Indo-American Arts Council Film Festival (MIAAC).

The festival began a series of one-minute cell phone films in 2008, in collaboration with New York University’s Tisch School of the Arts, New York Film Academy, and Whistling Woods International Institute for Films, Media, Animation and Media Arts.

In 2011, the festival was moved to May, instead of its traditional November date. India Abroad journalist Aseem Chhabra took over as festival director, and the festival name was changed to The New York Indian Film Festival. In 2022, many Indian films will be a part of the festival.This includes Shoe Box, Boomba Ride (Assamese), My Mother’s Girlfriend and more.

== The Festival ==
Each year, the festival screens about 40 films from Indian filmmakers, or films relating to India or the Indian Diaspora. Throughout the festival, industry panels and discussions with filmmakers are held, with Q&A’s after the screenings. Frequent festival attendees include Mira Nair, Salman Rushdie, Padma Lakshmi, Shabana Azmi, and Deepa Mehta.

The festival will usually hold a retrospective to honor a prominent filmmaker, artist, or actor, and will screen a number of their most notable films. Past retrospectives have featured Mira Nair, Smita Patil, and Rabindranath Tagore. The 12th NYIFF will feature a retrospective on the Indian film director Shyam Benegal.

Many films had their New York or world premiere at NYIFF, including:

- Monsoon Wedding (2001)
- Water (2005)
- Bride and Prejudice (2004)
- Born into Brothels (2005)
- The Namesake (2006)
- Slumdog Millionaire (2008)
- Gulaal (2009)
- The Japanese Wife (2010)
- Shor in the City (2010)
- Life! Camera Action...
- Iti Mrinalini (2011)
- Do Dooni Chaar (2011)
- Liar's Dice (2014)
- Bey yaar (2014)
- Family Party (2015)
- C/o Kancharapalem (2018)
- Sethum Aayiram Pon (2019)
- Koli Taal (2021)
- Madam Driver (2025)

=== 2021 edition of the festival ===
The 2021 edition of the festival was held from June 4 to June 13, 2021. Due to COVID-19 pandemic protocol it was held in virtual format for the second year in succession.

Number of films

58 films were screened which included featured, documentaries and shorts. Indian films in 15 languages including Assamese, Bengali, English, Hindi, Kannada, Kashmiri, Malayalam, Manipuri, Marathi, Nepali, Oriya, Punjabi, Tamil, Telugu and Urdu were screened.

Opening film

Where Is Pinki? (Pinki Eili?) by Prithvi Konanur

Closing film

Fire in the Mountains by Ajitpal Singh

=== 2022 edition of the festival ===
The 2022 edition of the festival was held from May 7 to May 14, 2022. Due to COVID-19 pandemic it was held in virtual format for the third year in succession.

Opening film

Godavari by Nikhil Mahajan

Closing film

The Beatles and India: An Enduring Love Affair by Ajoy Bose and Peter Compton

== Winners ==
Best Film - Nasir by Arun Karthick
Best Director - Ajitpal Singh for Fire in the Mountains
Best Actor - Siddharth Menon for June
Best Actress - Akshata Pandavapura for Where Is Pinki?
Best Child Actor - Karan Dave for Habbadi
Best Screenplay- Where Is Pinki? (Pinki Eili?)
Best Short (Narrative) - Sudipto Roy for Tasher Ghawr
Best Documentary (Feature) - Ahimsa- Gandhi: The Power of the Powerless by Ramesh Sharma
Best Documentary (Short) - Seva

== Jury ==
The festival’s jury consists of 13 members who have worked in both the Indian and American film industry. The jury's votes are monitored and collected by KPMG.

- Poorna Jagannathan (Actress)
- Ashish Avikunthak (Professor)
- Myrna Moncayo-Iyengar (Corporate Strategist)
- Udayan Gupta (Journalist)
- Muriel (Mike) Peters (Producer)
- Sabrina Dhawan (Screenwriter)
- Kavery Kaul (Filmmaker)
- Madhur Jaffrey (Actress)
- Jerry Carlson (Professor)
- Claus Mueller (Professor)
- Parag Amladi (Film Scholar)
- Zenobia Shroff (Actress)
- Nilita Vachani (Documentary Filmmaker)
