= Janam TV =

Indian Malayalam-language TV news channel

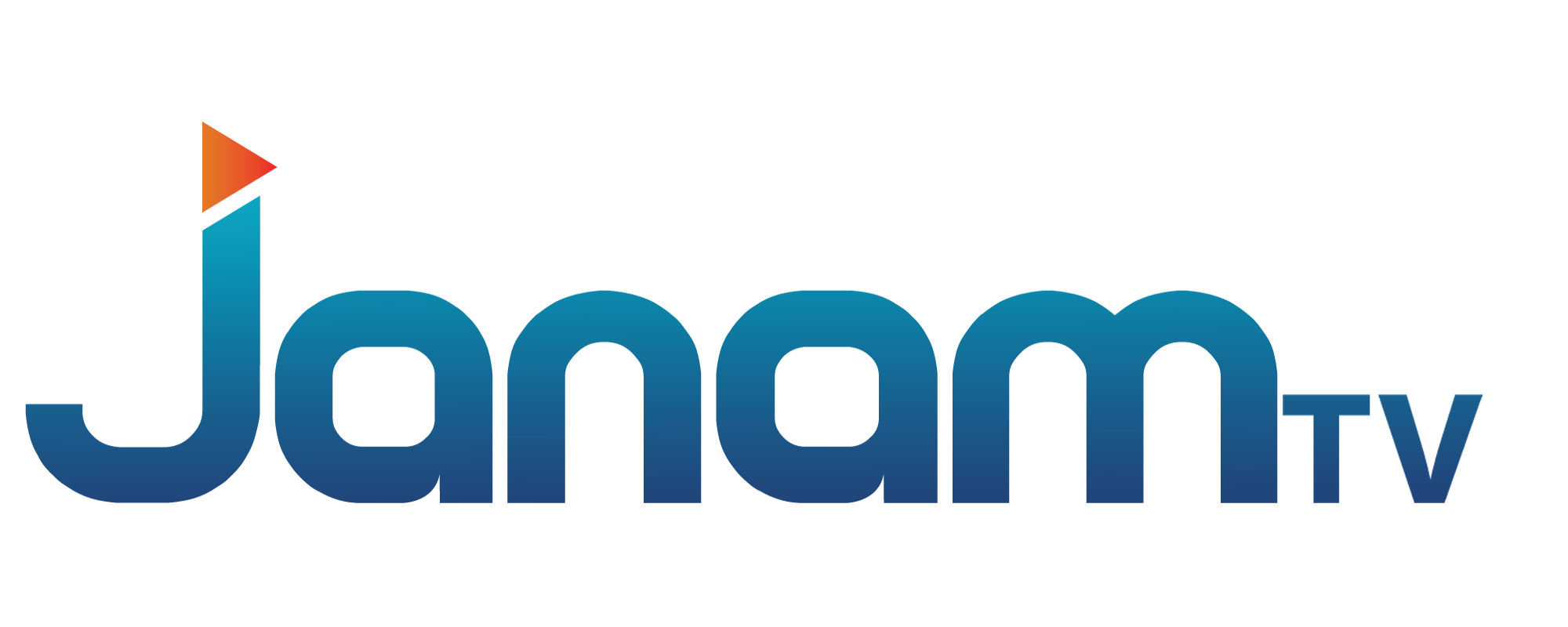
- Logo used since 2015

Programming
- Language: Malayalam
- Picture format: 576i SDTV

Ownership
- Owner: Janam Multimedia Limited
- Sister channels: Tamil Janam

History
- Launched: 19 April 2015; 11 years ago

Links
- Website: www.janamtv.com

Janam TV is an Indian Malayalam language free to air news channel owned by Janam Multimedia Limited. It was launched on 19 April 2015. The channel is headquartered in Thiruvanathapuram, Kerala. The channel serves as the mouthpiece of Bharatiya Janata Party (BJP) in Kerala.

== History ==
In 2012, a promoter group consisting of Indian and non-resident Indian businessperson had applied for permission to launch Janam TV. The clearance for the launch continued to be delayed by the Ministry of Information and Broadcasting (I&B) for two years. According to the COO Rajesh Pillai, the channel was flagged due to connections between the promoters group with the Rashtriya Swayamsevak Sangh and the Bharatiya Janata Party, a claim that Pillai himself denied.

The Bharatiya Janata Party led National Democratic Alliance formed a new government in 2014. The I&B Minister, Prakash Javadekar took up the cause for issuing clearance for the channel. The Ministry of Home Affairs granted the I&B Ministry with a report which acknowledged the connections but dismissed any concerns over adversity with the company or its promoters group.

It was reported that the Bharatiya Janata Party was attempting to raise the authorised capital of ₹50 crore (equivalent to ₹80 crore or US$8.3 million in 2023) for the company. Janam Multimedia Limited was the company which would operate the channel and the film director Priyadarshan was appointed as the chairman of its board of directors. In February 2015, the United Arab Emirates based chartered accountant and the director of the proposed channel, U. S. Krishnakumar issued a statement that the capital had been raised and Priyadarshan denied that the company had any political backing while stating that the channel was owned by 5,000 shareholders who had made investments in the company. The channel went on air from 19 April 2015 onwards, and was endorsed by the Kerala state president of the Bharatiya Janata Party.

== Content ==
Among notable events in its news coverage, the channel promoted the idea that the Hadiya case was a result of Love Jihad, a conspiracy theory developed by proponents of Hindutva. During the protests over the 2017 Unnao rape case and the Kathua rape case, it ran uninterrupted coverage of a "hoax hartal" in Kerala which depicted a violent hartal (transl. general strike) by Muslim organisations.

=== Sabarimala ===
The channel took a hardline stance against the entry of women to Sabarimala. It ran continuous programming of the development around the dispute at the Sabarimala temple, claiming that only it showed the "truth" about the events. Its coverage presented an alternate reality on the events at the site of the temple. In one of its reports, it falsely reported that women were entering the temple with blood stained sanitary napkins and trying to throw them at the idol. The canard was picked up by a number of other websites and eventually referred to by the then I&B Minister, Smriti Irani as desecration of a sacred site.

According to the data on television rating points of the Broadcast Audience Research Council (BARC), the channel became the second most popular news channel in the state, during the period between 3 and 9 November 2018. The rise in ratings of the channel was commended by the official Rashtriya Swayamsevak Sangh magazine Organiser, which published an article stating that Janam TV would bring electoral gains for the Bharatiya Janata Party in upcoming election in Kerala and that it signaled a growing acceptance for Hindutva in the state. According to former representative and media critic Sebastian Paul, the popularity was a temporary phenomenon and that the data itself was questionable due to the methodology used by BARC.

In 2020, BARC became the primary subject of a ratings manipulation case. During this period, the WhatsApp conversations of the CEO were leaked where it was revealed that he had discussed the ratings of Janam TV with his COO at the time of the Sabarimala dispute. The CEO in the conversation had also claimed that the Prime Minister's Office had taken note of the rise in popularity.

== Janam TV Tamil ==
Tamil Janam is a Tamil-language news channel owned by Marudham Multimedia Limited (owner of Tamil Janam TV). It is launched in 2024. It's available on Tata Play channel no 1570 and Airtel channel no 797. Janam is also planning to launch in Kannada, Telugu and other South Indian languages soon. A latest technology studio is under construction and expected to meet the future technology upgradation in the home theatre and television experience.

== Channels ==
Name	Language	Launched date	Note
Janam TV	Malayalam	19 April 2015	
Tamil Janam	Tamil	8 April 2024	
