= Attorney General for India v. Satish =

2021 criminal case considering POCSO Act

- Court: Supreme Court of India
- Full case name: Attorney General for India v. Satish & Anr
- Decided: November 18, 2021
- Citation: 2021 INSC 762

Court membership
- Judges sitting: Uday Umesh Lalit, S. Ravindra Bhat, and Bela M. Trivedi

Case opinions
- Decision by: Bela M. Trivedi
- Concurrence: S. Ravindra Bhat

Laws applied
- This case overturned a previous ruling
- Satish v. State of Maharashtra (2021) and Libnus v. State of Maharashtra (2021)

Attorney General for India v. Satish & Anr, 2021 INSC 762, is a landmark criminal case considered by the Supreme Court of India considering the POCSO Act, a law for the protection of children in India. The judgement is considered significant for definitively establishing "sexual intent" as the primary ingredient for establishing sexual assault against the children under the act, thereby restoring the protective framework intended by the POCSO Act.

The case arose from a Bombay High Court Nagpur bench judgement ruling that groping a minor’s breast without removing clothing did not constitute sexual assault under the Protection of Children from Sexual Offences (POCSO) Act, 2012. The ruling, also known as the "skin-to-skin contact" judgement, caused widespread outrage and was appealed to the higher court. On November 18, 2021 a three-judge bench of the Supreme Court of India unanimously overturned the high court decision.

== Background ==
The case emerged out of several rulings in January 2021 by Justice Pushpa Virendra Ganediwala, an additional judge of the Bombay High Court, relating to the sexual assault of minors. In the first case, Ganediwala adjudicated an appeal against a trial court that had convicted a 39-year-old man of taking a 12-year-old female child to his home on the pretext of offering her food and sexually assaulting her. The trial court had sentenced the offender to three years in prison under the POSCO Act but Ganediwala commuted the sentence holding that while the man had committed the offense of 'outraging a woman's modesty' under section 354 of the Indian Penal Code, it did not amount to a sexual offense against a child because he had groped her through her clothing. Ganediwala ruled that for an offense to qualify as sexual assault under the POCSO Act, there had to be "...skin to skin contact with sexual intent." In two other cases, Ganediwala similarly held that lack of physical contact did not constitute a POCSO offence, and that lack of violent struggle indicated that an assault could not have been non-consensual.

Ganediwala's decisions attracted wide attention and criticism. The first judgement, referred to as the 'skin-to-skin contact' judgement, was notably criticised. Following the widespread outrage, Attorney General of India mentioned the ruling before the Supreme Court, noting that it warranted the Court's attention and describing it as a "...very disturbing conclusion." The Supreme Court agreed to hear the matter suo motu and temporarily stayed the judgment.

The judgement was formally appealed by the Attorney General, as well as National Commission for Women, and the State of Maharashtra to the Supreme Court of India; with a counter-appeal by the appellant-accused Satish. Due to similar contextual legal issues, the court heard all four appeals together.

== Judgement ==
The judgement was rendered by a three-judge bench of Supreme Court consisting of Justices Uday Umesh Lalit, S. Ravindra Bhat, and Bela M. Trivedi. The unanimous judgement overturned the two judgements by the Justice Pushpa Virendra Ganediwala and ordered the accused to surrender before the special courts. The majority opinion was written by Justice Bela M. Trivedi with a concurring opinion by S. Ravindra Bhat.

=== Bela M. Trivedi and Uday Umesh Lalit ===
The key issue considered by the court was the interpretation of Section 7 of the POSCO Act that defines and addresses sexual assault against children. In her judgement, Justice Bela M. Trivedi relied on several precedents and legal principles to reason that the interpretation of "physical contact" to mean "skin to skin contact" would be an "absurd interpretation of the said provision [contained in Section 7] and lead to a very detrimental situation." She also rejected the arguments for rule of lenity and esjusdem genris by the accused, holding that there was no obscurity or uncertainty in the provisions of the POCSO Act and an interpretation otherwise would "defeat the very legislative intent."

=== S. Ravindra Bhat ===
Justice S. Ravindra Bhat in his separate concurring opinion referenced the mischief rule noting that "it is no part of any judge’s duty to strain the plain words of the statute, beyond recognition and to the point of destruction."

== See also ==
- Child abuse in India
- Protection of Children from Sexual Offences Act
- List of landmark court decisions in India
