= Bharati Harish Dangre =

Indian judge

Bharati Harish Dangre, J.

Judge of the Bombay High Court
- Incumbent
- Assumed office 5 June 2017

Personal details
- Born: 10 May 1968 (age 58)

Bharati Harish Dangre (born 10 May 1968) is a judge of the Bombay High Court in Maharashtra, India. Dangre has adjudicated on several significant cases concerning constitutional law, including the validity of affirmative action in the form of reservations for the Maratha caste in Maharashtra, the interpretation of child sexual abuse laws in India, and the implementation of the Goods and Services Tax in India.

== Life ==
Dangre was educated and trained in the law in Nagpur, Maharashtra. She initially practiced law in Nagpur, and later in the Bombay High Court. She was appointed a government counsel in Nagpur, and represented the Maharashtra State Road Development Corporation and the Nagpur Improvement Trust.

== Judicial career ==
Dangre was appointed a judge of the Bombay High Court on 5 June 2017.

In June 2019, Dangre and another judge, Ranjit More, upheld the constitutionality of a politically contentious legislation granting affirmative action to the Maratha caste in Maharashtra. Dangre and More directed the Maharashtra State Government to reduce the percentage of reservations granted to the Maratha caste from 16% to 12%. The judgment was criticized on several grounds, including whether the affirmative action was needed for the Maratha caste, as well as for violating a previous order from the Supreme Court of India that places a limit on the maximum cumulative reservations at 50%, as the Maratha reservation, in addition to existing reservations, would exceed this limit. The ruling was appealed to the Supreme Court of India, which issued a preliminary opinion on September 9, 2020, stating that the Bombay High Court was mistaken in maintaining the Act and preventing the Maharashtra government from implementing it at the time. The case is still being heard.

Dangre has ruled in a number of cases involving child sex abuse and the Protection of Children from Sexual Offences Act (POCSO). In July 2020, Dangre held that in cases involving child sexual abuse as well as caste-related offences, POCSO would take precedence, allowing such cases to be tried in special POCSO courts. This ruling established that POCSO has an overriding effect on other legislation. In September 2020, Dangre held that the Protection of Children from Sexual Offences Act in India did not apply to cases where acts constituting such abuse were committed without "sexual intent". The case concerned the removal of a child's clothes during a physical altercation. In December 2020, Dangre held that a man who restrained a 17-year-old girl by holding her arm, and made repeated romantic overtures to her despite her objections, including in person and via online messaging, had not committed offences under the POCSO Act. Dangre held that the man had "expressed his love," which was not, in her view, a violation of the Act.

In February 2018, Dangre and another judge, S.C. Dharmadhikari, criticized the Goods and Services Tax introduced into India, stating, "the regime is not tax-friendly." They directed the Maharashtra state government and Union government to establish a system to redress taxpayers' grievances in relation to the tax. Their critique was widely reported. The Government of India subsequently announced their intention to establish a grievance redressal mechanism.
