= Trafficking in Persons (Prevention, Care and Rehabilitation) Bill, 2021 =

Bill to provide anti-trafficking legislation in India

- Citation: TIP Bill 2021: TIP Bill 2018; TIP Bill 2016

Legislative history
- Bill title: Trafficking of Persons (Prevention, Protection and Rehabilitation) Bill 2018; Trafficking of Persons (Prevention, Protection and Rehabilitation) Bill, 2016
- Introduced by: Ministry of Women and Child Development

Keywords
- trafficking in persons, care, protection, rehabilitation, supportive environment, prosecution, commercial carrier, debt bondage, exploitation
- Status: Pending

Trafficking in Persons (Prevention, Care and Rehabilitation) Bill, 2021 or TIP Bill will provide for a comprehensive and dedicated anti-trafficking legislation in India.

== History ==
Trafficking in India has been dealt with under a number of laws such as Indian Penal Code of 1860, Immoral Traffic (Prevention) Act, 1986, Bonded Labour Regulation Act, 1986 and Child Labour Regulation Act, 1986. The 2021 bill aims to provide a dedicated legislation. Earlier forms of the proposed legislation included the Trafficking of Persons (Prevention, Protection and Rehabilitation) Bill 2016 and the Trafficking of Persons (Prevention, Protection and Rehabilitation) Bill, 2018. The 2018 bill was tabled in the Lok Sabha and passed in July 2018. However the bill never made it to the Rajya Sabha following public disapproval. Following the completion of the first term of the Narendra Modi government in 2019, the bill lapsed.

== Bills ==
=== TIP Bill 2016 ===
The Bill was questioned for not covering all forms of human trafficking, for not clearly covering cross-border trafficking, and for not clearly explaining how the law is supposed to interact with other legislation such as Protection of Children from Sexual Offence Act. The role of consent in whether the trafficked person wants to be rescued and rehabilitated is not sufficiently covered.

=== TIP Bill 2018 ===
The 2018 bill was again criticized for not doing what it set out to do, that of being "clear and comprehensive". It was criticized for being too criminal-centric and not victim-centric enough. The aspect of how the bill would fit into the current legislative framework was again raised.

=== TIP Bill 2021 ===
The 2021 bill makes the National Investigation Agency the lead investigating agency on such matters. However it was pointed out that the bill did not elucidate rescue protocols.
