= Government of India =

- Bhārata Sarakāra
- Federal government
- Government of India's logo with wordmark crested with the emblem of India on the left.

Overview
- Established: Current form: 26 January 1950; 76 years ago (see: Constitution of India)
- State: Republic of India
- Leader: President of India (Droupadi Murmu) (de jure); Prime Minister of India (Narendra Modi) (de facto)
- Main organ: Union Council of Ministers
- Ministries: 53 ministries, 50 subordinate departments and 2 independent departments
- Responsible to: Lok Sabha
- Annual budget: ₹50.65 trillion (equivalent to ₹52 trillion or US$560 billion in 2026)
- Headquarters: Rashtrapati Bhavan, Seva Teerth (PMO), Kartavya Bhavan, New Delhi

The Government of India (Devanagari: भारत सरकार; IAST: Bhārata Sarakāra; legally, the Union Government or the Union of India; informally, the Central Government) is the national authority of the Republic of India, established in accordance with the Constitution of India. As outlined in Part I, India is a "Union of States", a term often used interchangeably to refer to the "Union Government" or the Government of India, representing the central authority. India is a parliamentary republic led by the president of India, who, as the head of state, holds formal executive power. Dictated by parliamentary elections, the president appoints the prime minister as the head of government, along with other ministers.

India is divided into 28 states and 8 union territories, making a total of 36 subnational entities. The governance of these entities is described in the Constitution as a quasi-federal system, blending elements of both federal and unitary governments. While the states are self-governing administrative divisions with their own state governments, the union territories are directly governed by the Union Government, under the administration of a lieutenant governor or an appointed administrator, who is chosen by the president of India. India operates under a dual federalist system, where the Constitution outlines the powers and limitations of both the states and union territories.

The government's formal seat is at Parliament House in New Delhi. It has three primary branches: the legislature, the executive, and the judiciary. The Constitution of India vests legislative power in the bicameral Parliament of India, executive power in the Union Council of Ministers, and judicial power in the Supreme Court of India, with the president as head of state. It is a derivation of the British Westminster system and has a federal structure. The government is formed by the prime minister and ministers, who are members of parliament and belong to the Union Council of Ministers, with the prime minister at its head. The Union Council of Ministers is the peak decision-making body within the executive branch responsible for advising the president on executive policy.

The Union Council of Ministers is responsible to the Lok Sabha (lower house), as is the Cabinet, in accordance with the principles of responsible government. As is the case in most parliamentary systems, the government is dependent on Parliament to legislate, and general elections are held every five years to elect a new Lok Sabha. The most recent election was in 2024. After an election, the president generally selects as prime minister the leader of the party or alliance most likely to command the confidence of the majority of the Lok Sabha. If the Prime Minister is not a member of either house of parliament upon appointment, they are given six months to be elected or appointed to Parliament. (Note: It is however not mandated by the constitution for any minister including Prime Minister to 'get elected' as they can be from among the nominated members of Parliament. Six months is given to them for attaining the qualifications of being a member of Parliament so that they could be nominated as a members of Parliament within this duration.)

== History ==
=== British colonial rule: (1857–1947) ===
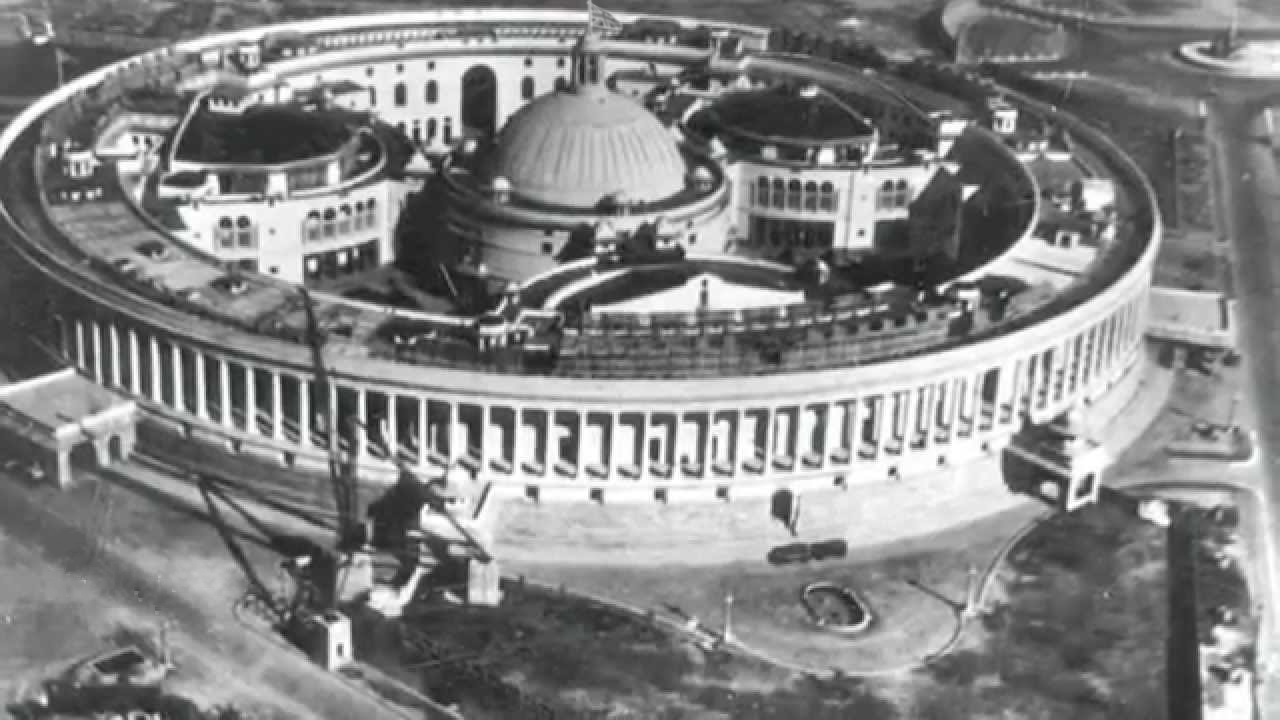
Council House in New Delhi, the seat of the former Imperial Legislative Council and home to the Parliament of India till 2023

The first seeds of elected representative government were sown during British colonial rule in India, in particular by the Indian Councils Act 1909, commonly known as the Morley-Minto reforms. The Act introduced elections to the Imperial Legislative Council (then the unicameral Legislature for British India). Before that, governance was carried out by an all-European Legislative Council and the Viceroy's Executive Council. As such, no Indians were represented in high levels of government before 1909.

India's current bicameral Parliament has its roots in the Government of India Act 1919, commonly known as the Montagu-Chelmsford reforms, which introduced a greatly expanded Imperial Legislative Council and the system of diarchy in provinces. It comprised a lower house, the Central Legislative Assembly, with 145 members (of which 104 were elected and 41 nominated); and an upper house, the Council of State, with 60 members (of which 34 were elected and 26 nominated).

The next structural modification to the governance of British India, the Government of India Act 1935 (the longest ever Act of Parliament of the United Kingdom until this record was surpassed by the Greater London Authority Act 1999) introduced provincial autonomy and laid the foundation for a federal structure in India. It also led to the establishment of important institutions such as the Union Public Service Commission. However, it was unpopular among Indians as it did not grant full self-rule or dominion status.

=== Dominion: (1947–1950) ===
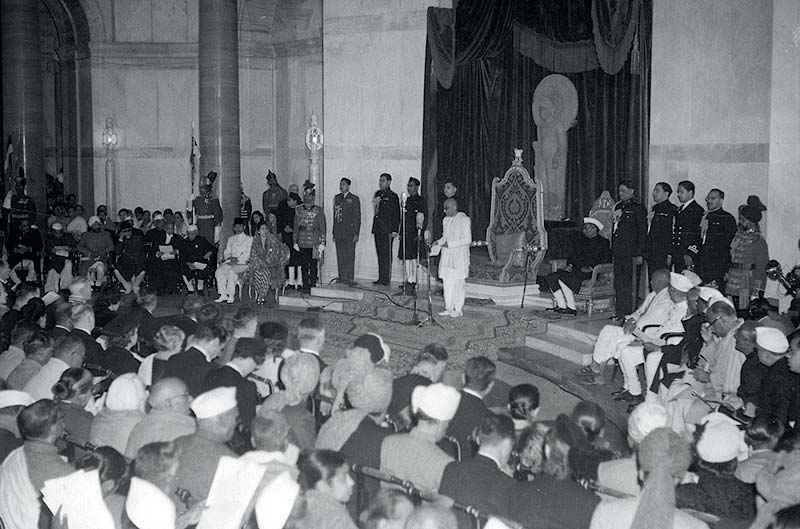
Governor-General of India C. Rajagopalachari declaring India a republic at Government House on 26 January 1950

Between midnight on 15 August 1947 and 26 January 1950, India was an independent, self-governing dominion of the Commonwealth of Nations, a constitutional monarchy with a Prime Minister and a Governor-General as the viceregal representative of the head of state, George VI. Its unicameral legislature, the Constituent Assembly, was tasked with drafting the country's constitution.

=== Republic: (1950–present) ===
The Constitution of India came into effect on 26 January 1950, making India a republic with a president as head of state, replacing the monarch and his viceregal representative, the governor-general. It established a parliamentary system of government and a federal structure with a strong centre.

It was based on the Government of India Act 1935, and also drew inspiration from several other constitutions including those of the United Kingdom, United States, Ireland, Canada, and France.

India today is the world's largest democracy, with a federal parliamentary system that has evolved significantly since independence.

== Nomenclature ==
The full name of the country is the Republic of India. India and Bharat are equally official short names for the Republic of India in the Constitution, and both names appear on legal banknotes, in treaties and in legal cases. The terms "Union government", "central government" and "bhārat sarkār" are often used officially and unofficially to refer to the government of India. The term New Delhi is commonly used as a metonym for the Union government, as the seat of the central government is in New Delhi.

== Basic structure ==
The Government of India is modelled after the Westminster system. The Union government is mainly composed of the executive, the legislature, and the judiciary, and powers are vested by the constitution in the council of ministers, parliament, and the supreme court, respectively. The president of India is the head of state and the commander-in-chief of the Indian Armed Forces, while the elected prime minister acts as the head of the executive and is responsible for running the Union government. Parliament is bicameral in nature, with the Lok Sabha being the lower house, and the Rajya Sabha the upper house. The judiciary systematically contains an apex supreme court, 25 high courts, and hundreds of district courts, all subordinate to the supreme court.

The basic civil and criminal laws governing the citizens of India are set down in major parliamentary legislation, such as the civil procedure code, the penal code, and the criminal procedure code. Similar to the Union government, individual state governments each consist of executive, legislative and judiciary branches. The legal system as applicable to the Union and individual state governments is based on the English common law and Statutory Law.

== Legislature ==
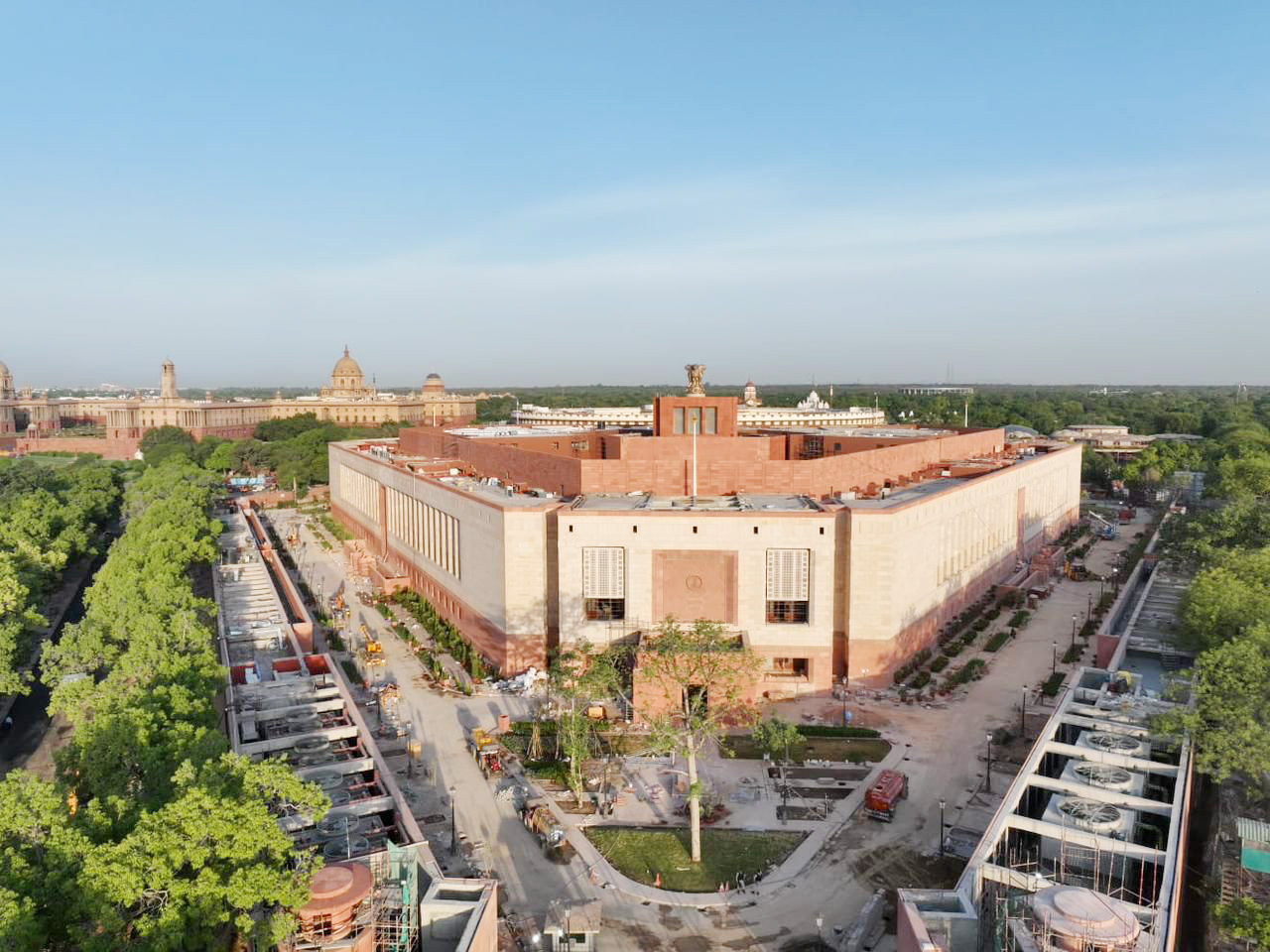
Parliament House in New Delhi

The powers of the legislature in India are exercised by the Parliament, a bicameral legislature consisting of the Rajya Sabha and the Lok Sabha. Of the two houses of parliament, the Rajya Sabha (or the 'Council of States') is considered to be the upper house and consists of members appointed by the president and elected by the state and territorial legislatures. The Lok Sabha (or the 'House of the People') is considered the lower house.

The parliament does not have complete control and sovereignty, as its laws are subject to judicial review by the Supreme Court. However, it does exercise some control over the executive. The members of the Council of Ministers, including the prime minister, are either chosen from parliament or elected there within six months of assuming office. The council as a whole is responsible to the Lok Sabha. The Lok Sabha is a temporary house and can be dissolved only when the party in power loses the support of the majority of the house. The Rajya Sabha is a permanent house and can never be dissolved. The members of the Rajya Sabha are elected for a six-year term.

== Executive ==
The executive of government has authority and responsibility to implement laws enacted by the legislature, and for the daily administration of the state through the civil service (the bureaucracy). The separation of various types of government power, its constraint and its sharing among the separate branches of government is central to the democratic idea of the separation of powers.

=== President ===
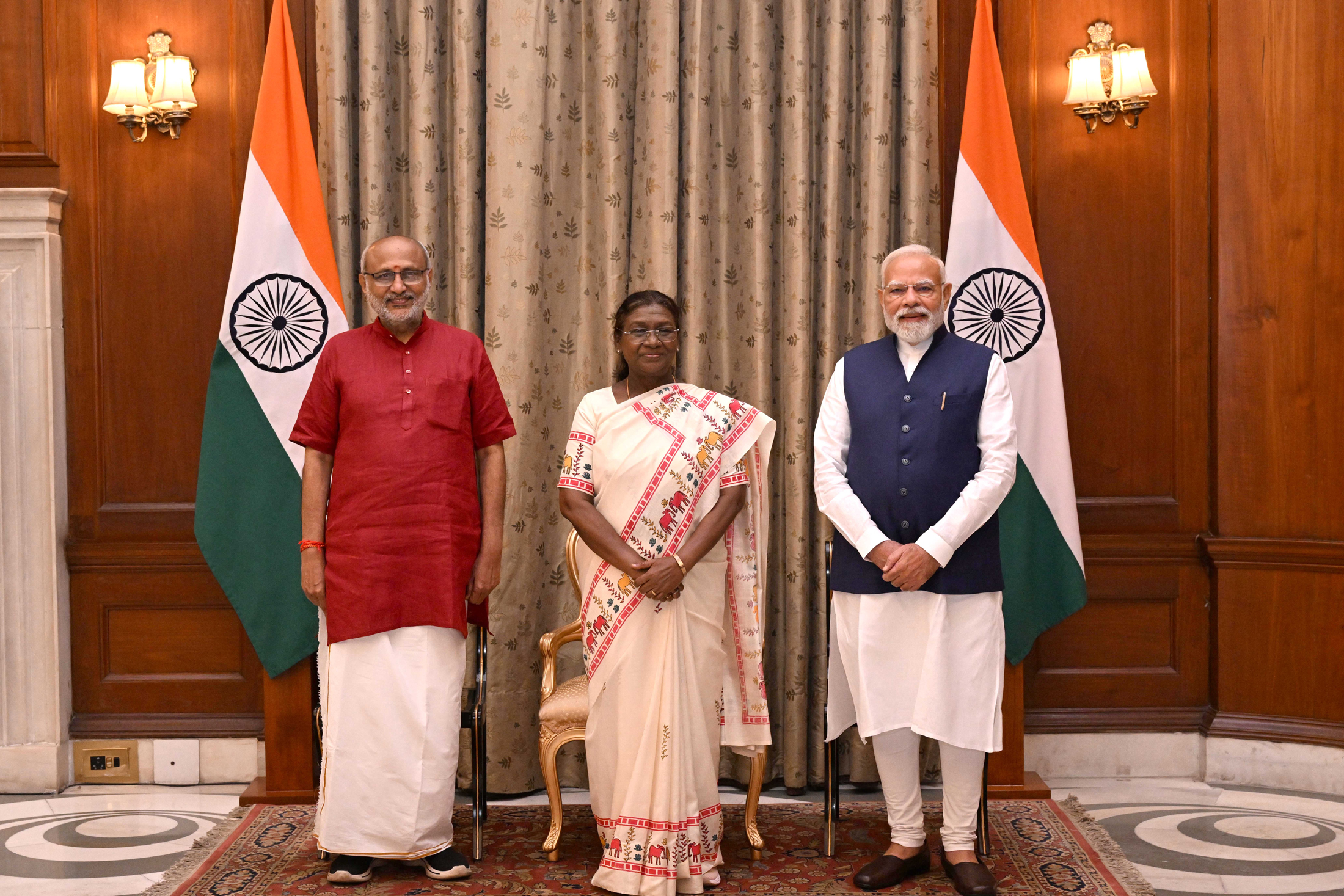
President Droupadi Murmu (center), Vice President C. P. Radhakrishnan (left), and Prime Minister Narendra Modi

The executive power is vested mainly in the president of India, as per Article 53(1) of the constitution. The president has all constitutional powers and exercises them directly or through subordinate officers as per the aforesaid Article 53(1). The president is to act following aid and advice tendered by the prime minister, who leads the Council of Ministers as described in Article 74 of the Constitution.

The council of ministers remains in power during the 'pleasure' of the president. However, in practice, the council of ministers must retain the support of the Lok Sabha. If a president were to dismiss the council of ministers on her or his own initiative (ie, without advice to do so from the prime minister), it might trigger a constitutional crisis. Thus, in practice, the Council of Ministers cannot be dismissed as long as it holds the support of a majority in the Lok Sabha.

The president is formally responsible for appointing many high level government officials in India. These high officials include the governors of the 28 states; the chief justice of India; other judges of the supreme court and high courts (on the advice of other judges); the attorney general; the comptroller and auditor general; the chief election commissioner and other election commissioners; the chairperson and members of the Union Public Service Commission; the officers of the All India Services (IAS, IFoS and IPS) and Central Civil Services in group 'A'; officers of the Indian Armed Forces; and ambassadors and high commissioners to other countries; among many others. Such appointments are made 'on advice': that is, on the recommendation of ministers

The president, as the head of state, also receives the credentials of ambassadors from other countries, while the prime minister, as head of government, receives credentials of high commissioners from other members of the Commonwealth, in line with historical tradition.

The president is the de jure commander-in-chief of the Indian Armed Forces.

The president can pardon or reduce the sentence of a convicted person once, particularly in cases involving the punishment of death. Decisions involving pardons and certain other matters are made independently of the advice of the prime minister or the opinion of the Lok Sabha majority. In most other cases, however, the president exercises any executive power only on the advice of the prime minister.

=== Vice president ===
The vice president is the second-highest constitutional position in India after the president. The vice president represents the nation in the absence of the president and takes charge as acting president in the case of resignation, impeachment or removal of the president. The vice president also has the legislative function of acting as the chairperson of the Rajya Sabha. The vice president is elected indirectly by members of an electoral college consisting of the members of both the houses of parliament.

=== Prime minister ===
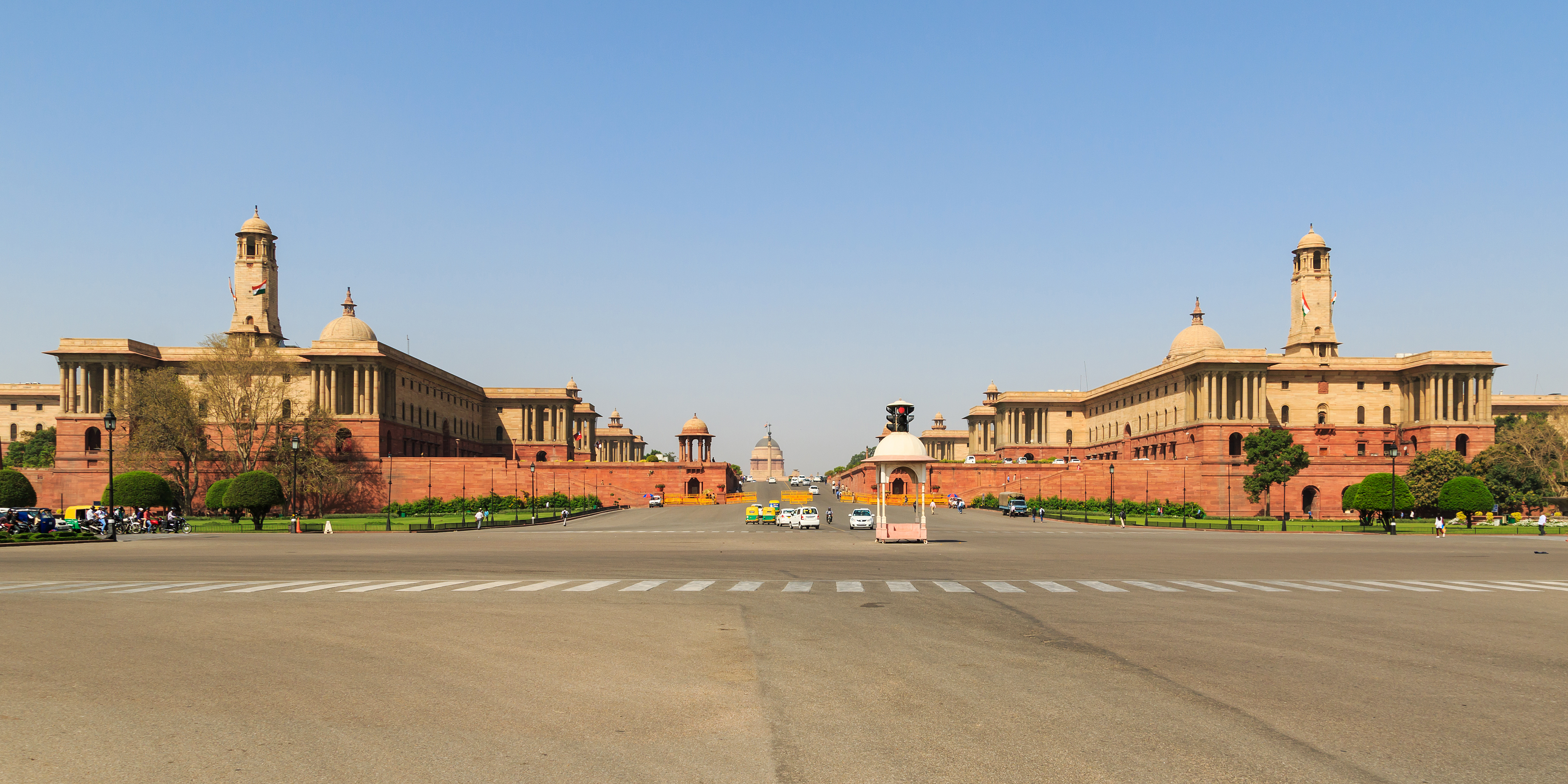
North and South Blocks of the Central Secretariat housing various ministries of the Government of India, with the Rashtrapati Bhavan visible in the distance

The prime minister of India, as addressed in the Constitution of India, is the chief executive of the government and the leader of the majority party that holds a majority in the Lok Sabha. The prime minister leads the executive of the Government of India.

The prime minister is the senior member of the cabinet in the executive government in a parliamentary system. The prime minister selects and can dismiss other members of the cabinet; allocates posts to members within the Government; is the presiding member and chairperson of the cabinet and is responsible for bringing a proposal of legislation. The resignation or death of the prime minister dissolves the cabinet.

The prime minister is appointed by the president to assist the latter in the administration of the affairs of the executive.

=== Cabinet, ministries and agencies ===
The organizational structure of a department of the Government of India.

The Union Council of Ministers includes the prime minister, Cabinet Ministers and Ministers of State (MoS). Each minister must be a member of one of the houses of the parliament. The cabinet is headed by the prime minister, and is advised by the cabinet secretary, who also acts as the head of the Indian Administrative Service and other civil services. Other members of the council are either union cabinet ministers, who are heads of various ministries; or ministers of state, who are junior members who report directly to one of the cabinet ministers, often overseeing a specific aspect of government; or ministers of state (independent charges), who do not report to a cabinet minister. As per article 88 of the constitution, every minister shall have the right to speak in, and to take part in the proceedings of, either house, any joint sitting of the houses, and any committee of parliament of which he may be named a member, but shall not be entitled to a vote in the house where he is not a member.

==== Secretaries ====
A secretary to the Government of India, a civil servant, generally an Indian Administrative Service (IAS) officer, is the administrative head of the ministry or department, and is the principal adviser to the minister on all matters of policy and administration within the ministry/department. Secretaries to the Government of India rank 23rd on Indian order of precedence. Secretaries at the higher level are assisted by one or many additional secretaries, who are further assisted by joint secretaries. At the middle they are assisted by directors/deputy secretaries and under secretaries. At the lower level, there are section officers, assistant section officers, upper division clerks, lower division clerks and other secretarial staff.

Ministries and departments of the Government of India
#	Ministry	Department(s)
1	Prime Minister's Office	Department of Atomic Energy
1	Prime Minister's Office	Department of Space
2	Ministry of Agriculture and Farmers Welfare	Department of Agriculture and Farmers Welfare
2	Ministry of Agriculture and Farmers Welfare	Department of Agricultural Research and Education
3	Ministry of Ayush	
4	Ministry of Chemicals and Fertilizers	Department of Chemicals and Petrochemicals
4	Ministry of Chemicals and Fertilizers	Department of Fertilizers
4	Ministry of Chemicals and Fertilizers	Department of Pharmaceuticals
5	Ministry of Civil Aviation	
6	Ministry of Co-operation	
7	Ministry of Coal	
8	Ministry of Commerce and Industry	Department for Promotion of Industry and Internal Trade
8	Ministry of Commerce and Industry	Department of Commerce
9	Ministry of Communications	Department of Posts
9	Ministry of Communications	Department of Telecommunications
10	Ministry of Consumer Affairs, Food and Public Distribution	Department of Consumer Affairs
10	Ministry of Consumer Affairs, Food and Public Distribution	Department of Food and Public Distribution
11	Ministry of Corporate Affairs	
12	Ministry of Culture	
13	Ministry of Defence	Department of Defence
13	Ministry of Defence	Department of Defence Production
13	Ministry of Defence	Department of Defence Research and Development
13	Ministry of Defence	Department of Ex-servicemen Welfare
13	Ministry of Defence	Department of Military Affairs
14	Ministry of Development of North Eastern Region	
15	Ministry of Earth Sciences	
16	Ministry of Education	Department of Higher Education
16	Ministry of Education	Department of School Education and Literacy
17	Ministry of Electronics and Information Technology	
18	Ministry of Environment, Forest and Climate Change	
19	Ministry of External Affairs	
20	Ministry of Finance	Department of Economic Affairs
20	Ministry of Finance	Department of Expenditure
20	Ministry of Finance	Department of Financial Services
20	Ministry of Finance	Department of Investment and Public Asset Management
20	Ministry of Finance	Department of Public Enterprises
20	Ministry of Finance	Department of Revenue
21	Ministry of Fisheries, Animal Husbandry and Dairying	Department of Animal Husbandry, Dairying & Fisheries
22	Ministry of Food Processing Industries	
23	Ministry of Health and Family Welfare	Department of Family Welfare
23	Ministry of Health and Family Welfare	Department of Health
23	Ministry of Health and Family Welfare	Department of Health Research
24	Ministry of Heavy Industries	
25	Ministry of Home Affairs	Department of Border Management
25	Ministry of Home Affairs	Department of Home
25	Ministry of Home Affairs	Department of Internal Security
25	Ministry of Home Affairs	Department of Jammu, Kashmir and Ladakh Affairs
25	Ministry of Home Affairs	Department of Official Language
25	Ministry of Home Affairs	Department of States
26	Ministry of Housing and Urban Affairs	Central Public Works Department
27	Ministry of Information and Broadcasting	
28	Ministry of Jal Shakti	
29	Ministry of Labour and Employment	
30	Ministry of Law and Justice	Department of Legal Affairs
30	Ministry of Law and Justice	Department of Justice
30	Ministry of Law and Justice	Legislative Department
31	Ministry of Micro, Small and Medium Enterprises	
32	Ministry of Mines	
33	Ministry of Minority Affairs	
34	Ministry of New and Renewable Energy	
35	Ministry of Panchayati Raj	
36	Ministry of Parliamentary Affairs	
37	Ministry of Personnel, Public Grievances and Pensions	Department of Administrative Reforms & Public Grievances
37	Ministry of Personnel, Public Grievances and Pensions	Department of Pension and Pensioners' Welfare
37	Ministry of Personnel, Public Grievances and Pensions	Department of Personnel and Training
38	Ministry of Petroleum and Natural Gas	
39	Ministry of Planning	
40	Ministry of Ports, Shipping and Waterways	
41	Ministry of Power	
42	Ministry of Railways	
43	Ministry of Road Transport and Highways	
44	Ministry of Rural Development	Department of Land Resources
44	Ministry of Rural Development	Department of Rural Development
45	Ministry of Science and Technology	Department of Biotechnology
45	Ministry of Science and Technology	Department of Scientific and Industrial Research
45	Ministry of Science and Technology	Department of Science and Technology
46	Ministry of Skill Development and Entrepreneurship	
47	Ministry of Social Justice and Empowerment	Department of Empowerment of Persons with Disabilities
47	Ministry of Social Justice and Empowerment	Department of Social Justice and Empowerment
48	Ministry of Statistics and Programme Implementation	
49	Ministry of Steel	
50	Ministry of Textiles	
51	Ministry of Tourism	
52	Ministry of Tribal Affairs	
53	Ministry of Women and Child Development	
54	Ministry of Youth Affairs and Sports	Department of Youth Affairs
54	Ministry of Youth Affairs and Sports	Department of Sports

=== Civil services ===
The Civil Services of India are the civil services and the permanent bureaucracy of India. The executive decisions are implemented by the Indian civil servants.

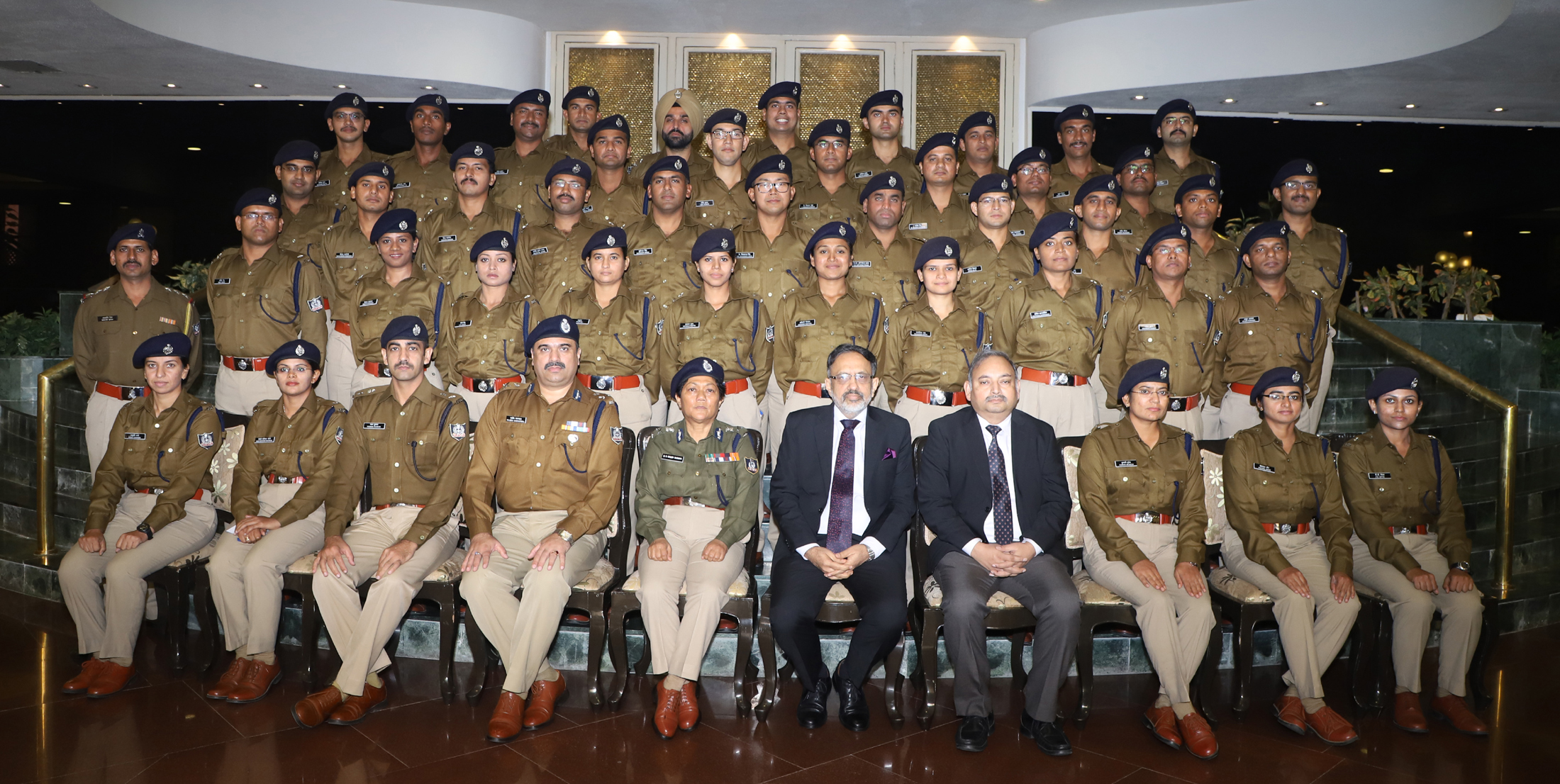
Cabinet Secretary Rajiv Gauba, an Indian Administrative Service officer meets with trainee officers of the Indian Police Service; both arms of the All India Services

In the parliamentary democracy of India, the ultimate responsibility for running the administration rests with the elected representatives of the people which are the ministers. These ministers are accountable to the legislatures which are also elected by the people based on universal adult suffrage. The ministers are indirectly responsible to the people themselves. But the handful of ministers is not expected to deal personally with the various problems of modern administration. Thus the ministers lay down the policy and it is for the civil servants to enforce it.

==== Cabinet secretary ====
The cabinet secretary (IAST: Maṃtrimaṇḍala Saciva) is the top-most executive official and senior-most civil servant of the Government of India. The cabinet secretary is the ex-officio head of the Civil Services Board, the Cabinet Secretariat, the Indian Administrative Service (IAS) and the head of all civil services under the rules of business of the government.

The cabinet secretary is generally the senior-most officer of the Indian Administrative Service. The cabinet secretary ranks 11th on the Indian order of precedence. The cabinet secretary is under the direct charge of the Prime Minister. Presently, the Cabinet Secretary of India is V. Somanathan, IAS.

== Judiciary ==
India's independent centralised judicial system began under the British, and its concepts and procedures resemble those of Anglo-Saxon countries. The Supreme Court of India consists of a Chief Justice and 37 associate justices, all appointed by the President on the recommendations of a collegium of senior judges. Jury trials were abolished in the early 1960s, following KM Nanavati v. the State of Maharashtra. However, the impact of the case on the abolition of jury trials is disputed.

Unlike its United States counterpart, the Indian justice system consists of a unitary system at both state and union levels. The judiciary consists of the Supreme Court of India, High Courts at the state level, and District Courts and Sessions Courts at the district level, in addition to various tribunals and special courts.

=== Supreme Court ===
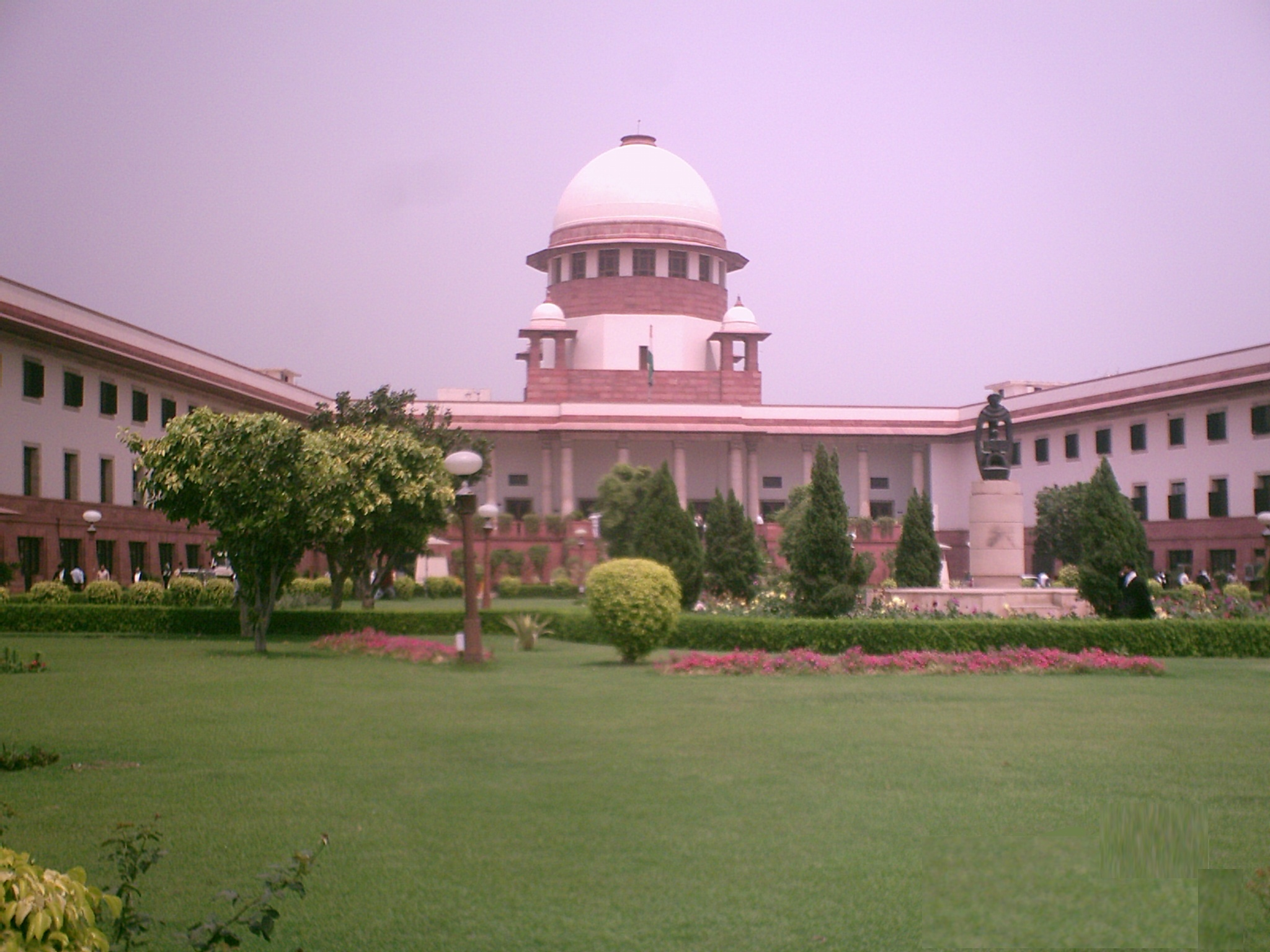
Complex of the Supreme Court of India in New Delhi

The Supreme Court of India is situated in New Delhi, the capital region of India.

The Supreme Court is the highest judicial forum and final court of appeal under the Constitution of India, the highest constitutional court, with the power of constitutional review. Consisting of the Chief Justice of India and 37 sanctioned other judges, it has extensive powers in the form of original, appellate and advisory jurisdictions.

As the final court of appeal of the country, it takes up appeals primarily against verdicts of the High Courts of various states and other courts and tribunals. It safeguards fundamental rights of citizens and settles disputes between various governments in the country. As an advisory court, it hears matters that may specifically be referred to it under the Constitution by the President. It also may take cognisance of matters on its own (or 'suo moto'). The law declared by the Supreme Court becomes binding on all courts within India and also on the union and state governments. Per Article 142, it is the duty of the President to enforce the decrees of the Supreme Court.

In addition, Article 32 of the Constitution gives extensive original jurisdiction to the Supreme Court concerning enforcement of fundamental rights. It is empowered to issue directions, orders, or writs, including writs in the nature of habeas corpus, mandamus, prohibition, quo warranto and certiorari to enforce them. The Supreme Court has been conferred with the power to direct the transfer of any civil or criminal matter from one High Court to another, or from a court subordinate to itself or a High Court. Although proceedings in the Supreme Court arise out of judgments or orders of subordinate courts, since the early 1970s the Supreme Court has started adjudicating matters of national importance, or matters of public interest. This may be done by any individual or group of persons either by filing a writ petition at the filing counter of the court or by addressing a letter to the Chief Justice of India, highlighting the question of public importance for redress. These are known as public interest litigations.

== Elections and voting ==
India has a quasi-federal form of government, called "union" or "central" government, with elected officials at the union, state and local levels. At the national level, the head of government, the prime minister, is appointed by the president of India from the party or coalition that has the majority of seats in the Lok Sabha. The members of the Lok Sabha are directly elected for a term of five years by universal adult suffrage through a first-past-the-post voting system. Members of the Rajya Sabha, which represents the states, are elected by the members of State legislative assemblies by proportional representation, except for 12 members who are nominated by the president.

The Election Commission of India conducts national and state elections, while State Election Commissions conduct local government elections.

India is currently the largest democracy in the world, with around 900 million eligible voters, as of 2019.

== State and local governments ==
In India, power is divided between the governments of the union and the states of India, the latter being ruled by the chiefs ministers. The state legislature is bicameral in six states and unicameral in the rest. The lower house is elected with a five-year term, while in the upper house one-third of the members in the house gets elected every two years with six-year terms.

Union territories are administered directly by the union government through an Administrator or Lieutenant Governor, though some have legislatures and elected governments with limited powers.

Local governments function at the basic level. It is the third level of government apart from union and state governments. It consists of panchayats in rural areas and municipalities in urban areas. They are elected directly or indirectly by the people.

Local governments, comprising Panchayati Raj Institutions in rural areas and Urban Local Bodies in urban areas, function under the 73rd and 74th Constitutional Amendments to promote democratic decentralization. Each state also enacts its own legislation to regulate the structure and functioning of local governments.

== Finance ==
=== Taxation ===
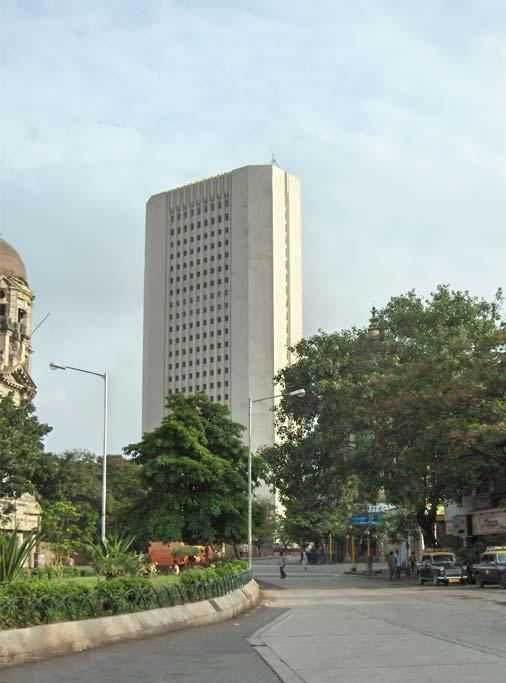
Reserve Bank of India's headquarters in Mumbai, India's financial capital

India has a three-tier tax structure, wherein the constitution empowers the union government to levy income tax, tax on capital transactions (wealth tax, inheritance tax), sales tax, service tax, customs and excise duties and the state governments to levy sales tax on intrastate sale of goods, taxon entertainment and professions, excise duties on manufacture of alcohol, stamp duties on transfer of property and collect land revenue (levy on land owned). The local governments are empowered by the state government to levy property tax and charge users for public utilities like water supply, sewage etc. More than half of the revenues of the union and state governments come from taxes, of which 3/4 come from direct taxes. More than a quarter of the union government's tax revenues are shared with the state governments.

The tax reforms, initiated in 1991, have sought to rationalise the tax structure and increase compliance by taking steps in the following directions:

- Reducing the rates of individual and corporate income taxes, excises, and customs and making it more progressive
- Reducing exemptions and concessions
- Simplification of laws and procedures
- Introduction of permanent account number (PAN) to track monetary transactions
- 21 of the 29 states introduced value added tax (VAT) on 1 April 2005 to replace the complex and multiple sales tax system

The non-tax revenues of the central government come from fiscal services, interest receipts, public sector dividends, etc., while the non-tax revenues of the States are grants from the central government, interest receipts, dividends and income from general, economic and social services.

Inter-state share in the union tax pool is decided by the recommendations of the Finance Commission to the president.

Total tax receipts of Centre and State amount to approximately 18% of national GDP. This compares to a figure of 37–45% in the OECD.

=== Union budget ===
The Finance minister of India usually presents the annual union budget in the parliament on the last working day of February. However, for the F.Y. 2017–18, this tradition had been changed. Now the budget will be presented on the 1st day of February. The budget has to be passed by the Lok Sabha before it can come into effect on 1 April, the start of India's fiscal year. The Union budget is preceded by an economic survey which outlines the broad direction of the budget and the economic performance of the country for the outgoing financial year

India's non-development revenue expenditure had increased nearly five-fold in 2003–04 since 1990–91 and more than tenfold from 1985 to 1986. Interest payments are the single largest item of expenditure and accounted for more than 40% of the total non-development expenditure in the 2003–04 budget. Defence expenditure increased fourfold during the same period and has been increasing to defend from a difficult neighbourhood and external terror threats. In 2025–26, India's defence budget stood at ₹6.81 trillion (equivalent to ₹7.0 trillion or US$75 billion in 2026).

== Issues ==
=== Corruption ===
In 2009, several ministers are accused of corruption and nearly a quarter of the 543 elected members of parliament had been charged with crimes, including murder. Many of the biggest scandals since 2010 have involved high-level government officials, including cabinet ministers and chief ministers, such as the 2010 Commonwealth Games scandal (₹700 billion (equivalent to ₹1.7 trillion or US$18 billion in 2026)), the Adarsh Housing Society scandal, the Coal allocation scandal (₹1.86 trillion (equivalent to ₹4.6 trillion or US$49 billion in 2026)), the mining scandal in Karnataka and the cash-for-votes scandal.

=== Administrative and bureaucratic delays ===
The Indian bureaucracy suffers from indecision and risk aversion. In 2023, a Moody's report noted that a lack of certainty around the time needed for land-acquisition approvals, regulatory clearances, obtaining licences, and establishing businesses can "materially prolong" project timelines in India.

== See also ==
- Foreign relations of India
- List of central agencies in India
- National Portal of India
- National Social-media Portal
- Union government ministries of India
