= Tulir (NGO) =

Tulir - Centre for the Prevention and Healing of Child Sexual Abuse (CPHCSA) is an NGO focused on child sexual abuse awareness and rehabilitation, based in Chennai, India. In Tamil, the word Tulir means the first leaves of a plant, symbolising children and "the belief in the resilience and resurgence of the human spirit." The NGO is run by Vidya Reddy.

== Background ==
A study conducted by the Ministry of Women and Child Development in 2007 revealed that approximately 53.22% of children experience sexual abuse. [3] However, due to the taboo nature of sex in conservative societies, instances of child sexual abuse often go unnoticed and are not reported. In 2005, Tulir, in collaboration with Save The Children, conducted a study in Chennai, surveying 2211 school children from various backgrounds. [3] The study uncovered that 48% of boys and 39% of girls interviewed disclosed having experienced sexual abuse, with the perpetrators being individuals known to them.

== Activities ==
Tulir engages in the following activities:

- raising awareness of child sexual abuse in India
- providing direct intervention services in the areas of prevention and healing
- undertaking research, documentation, and dissemination of information on child sexual abuse
- working to improve policy and advance the prevention of child sexual abuse, with a special focus on the psychosocial well-being of children.

The organisation also participates in local, national, and international efforts to promote and protect the rights of children.

Tulir holds workshops for schools to address child sexual abuse holistically. One such workshop was held from November 28–30, 2016, called "Safe Schools: Supporting schools address child sexual abuse, holistically". It covered topics such as prevention of child sexual abuse, developing a child protection policy, introducing concepts and practice for personal safety education, and addressing sexual misbehaviors in children and youth and POCSO, educators and schools.

They also offer training and consultancy services to teachers, social workers, doctors, parents, lawyers, and police personnel.

== Awards and honors ==
In 2006, Tulir received an international award by the Women's World Summit Foundation on the occasion of the World Day for Prevention of Child Abuse (19 November) in Geneva.
