= Pushpa Virendra Ganediwala =

Former Additional Judge of Bombay High Court

Additional Judge of Bombay High Court
- In office 13 February 2019 – 11 February 2022
- Nominated by: Ranjan Gogoi
- Appointed by: Ram Nath Kovind

Personal details
- Born: 11 March 1969 (age 57) Paratwada, Maharashtra, India

Pushpa Virendra Ganediwala (born 11 March 1969) is an Indian lawyer. She was previously an additional judge of the Bombay High Court, but resigned in 2022, after the Supreme Court of India took the extraordinary step of refusing to confirm her appointment to the High Court as a permanent judge, after she delivered several controversial judgments concerning cases of sexual assaults against women and children.

== Early life and education ==
Ganediwala was born in 1969 in Paratwada in Amravati District in Maharashtra. She has B.Com., LL.B, and LL.M degrees.

== Career ==
=== Litigation ===
Ganediwala initially practiced law in Amravati District Court, and also lectured on law at Amravati University. In 2022, she returned to private practice, following her resignation as an additional judge of the Bombay High Court.

=== Judicial ===
Ganediwala was appointed as a District Judge in 2007, and served on the City Civil Court in Mumbai and the District and Family Courts in Nagpur. She later became the Principal District and Sessions Judge in Nagpur, and subsequently was appointed as the Registrar-General of the Bombay High Court.

In 2018, Ganediwala was one of several judges who were considered for appointment to the Bombay High Court, but was not appointed after the Bombay High Court recommended against it. The Supreme Court of India accepted the Bombay High Court's adverse recommendations and decided to defer consideration of her appointment. In 2019, Ganediwala's appointment was reconsidered, and she was appointed as an additional judge in the Bombay High Court.

As Registrar-General of the Bombay High Court, Ganediwala took the widely reported decision of suspending City Civil and Sessions Judge Ajay Dinode, while he was hearing a case relating to an alleged Rs.56,000 million fraud in relation to the National Spot Exchange Limited, causing the case to be delayed further.

Ganediwala has, along with two other judges, commuted death penalty sentences to life imprisonment in two cases while sitting on the Bombay High Court, in 2019. Both cases concerned the offence of murder.

In 2020, Ganediwala heard and passed directions in a number of cases relating to the COVID-19 pandemic in India. In September 2020, Ganediwala and another judge heard a case concerning the shortage of available hospital beds and treatment facilities for patients with COVID-19 in Nagpur, Maharashtra, and directed the State Government of Maharashtra to make available sufficient staff and facilities for treatment. In the same month, Ganediwala rejected a plea to have the Joint Entrance Examination postponed (a national assessment examination held for admission to engineering courses) in light of the COVID-19 pandemic, as well as widespread flooding in parts of Maharashtra, but directed the examining authorities to facilitate re-examinations for those who could not attend the scheduled examination date because of these difficulties. In October 2020, Ganediwala and another judge directed government-run hospitals to constitute a panel and provide treatment to a pregnant woman who had been denied hospital consultations on the grounds that she had tested positive for COVID-19, and compared the treatment of patients with COVID-19 to the generational, social, and public discrimination caused by the practice of untouchability against Dalit communities.

Ganediwala has spoken publicly about the need to reduce pending cases in the family courts in Mumbai, and has criticised Maharashtra Police for failing to conduct investigations sufficiently, linking this to acquittals in criminal cases.

=== 2021 sexual assault judgments and resignation ===
In January 2021, Ganediwala adjudicated an appeal against a trial court that had convicted a 39-year-old man of taking a 12-year-old female child to his home on the pretext of offering her food, and sexually assaulting her. The trial court had sentenced the offender to three years in prison, which is the minimum sentence for sexual assault against children under the Protection of Children from Sexual Offences Act (POCSO Act). Ganediwala reduced the three-year sentence to one year, holding that while the man had committed the offense of 'outraging a woman's modesty' under section 354 of the Indian Penal Code, it did not amount to a sexual offense against a child because he had groped her through her clothing. Ganediwala ruled that for an offense to qualify as sexual assault under the POCSO Act, there had to be "...skin to skin contact with sexual intent." The decision was widely reported. She also adjudicated in two more cases concerning sexual assault against minors. In a second case, Ganediwala ruled that the acts of a man who took touched a female child's hand and exposed himself to another five-year-old female child did not constitute offences under POCSO because there was no physical contact between the children and the man. In a third case decided in the same period, Ganediwala acquitted a man convicted of sexual assault against a woman, holding that the survivor's testimony was unreliable, and that the absence of signs of violent struggle indicated it could not have been non-consensual.

Ganediwala attracted wide criticism for the first concerning 'skin to skin' contact, and the National Commission for the Protection of Child Rights asked the Maharashtra government to file a letters patent appeal in the Bombay High Court, to have the judgment reversed. The National Commission for Women also expressed their intention to appeal the ruling, noting that it would have "...a cascading effect on various provisions involving safety and security of women in general but also subject all women to ridicule." Several public figures and women's rights activists criticised the interpretation offered by Ganediwala. Retired Judge Ajay Thipsay described the order as "not sound" and "...a little absurd," noting that there was no legal basis for Ganediwala's requirement of 'skin to skin' contact within the Act. Child rights activists noted that the language of POCSO specifically criminalizes attempts at sexual assault as well, and that this had not been considered. Politician Brinda Karat described Ganediwala's reasoning as unacceptable, noting that the case raised "questions of the competence and standards of those mandated to bring justice in sexual assault cases."

On 27 January 2021, the Attorney-General of India mentioned the ruling before the Supreme Court, noting that it warranted the Court's attention and describing it as a "...very disturbing conclusion." The Supreme Court agreed to hear the matter suo motu and temporarily stayed the judgment, allowing the Attorney-General to file a petition for a more detailed consideration. On 29 January, the Supreme Court withdrew a recommendation that they had made on 22 January 2021 to make her appointment permanent, mentioning the three sexual assault rulings above as the reason for questioning her fitness to continue as a High Court judge. Instead, on 13 February 2021 she received a one-year extension on her position as an additional judge. In November 2021, Ganediwala's judgment on the requirement of 'skin to skin' contact was overruled by the Indian Supreme Court, which held that such an interpretation was contrary to the POCSO Act and would subvert its aims.

On 22 January 2021, the Supreme Court confirmed the Bombay High Court's recommendation that Ganediwala's appointment should be made permanent but withdrew that recommendation on 29 January 2021 in light of three rulings that Ganediwala made, all of which involved acquittals or reductions of sentences in cases concerning sexual assault. On 17 December 2021, the Supreme Court confirmed that her appointment to the High Court would not be made permanent, and accordingly, she would be demoted back to the district judiciary once her temporary term at the High Court ended. On 11 February 2022, she resigned two days before her High Court term ended.

== See also ==
- Attorney General for India v. Satish
