= Kathua rape and murder case =

2018 crime in Jammu and Kashmir, India

2018 Kathua abduction, gang rape and murder case
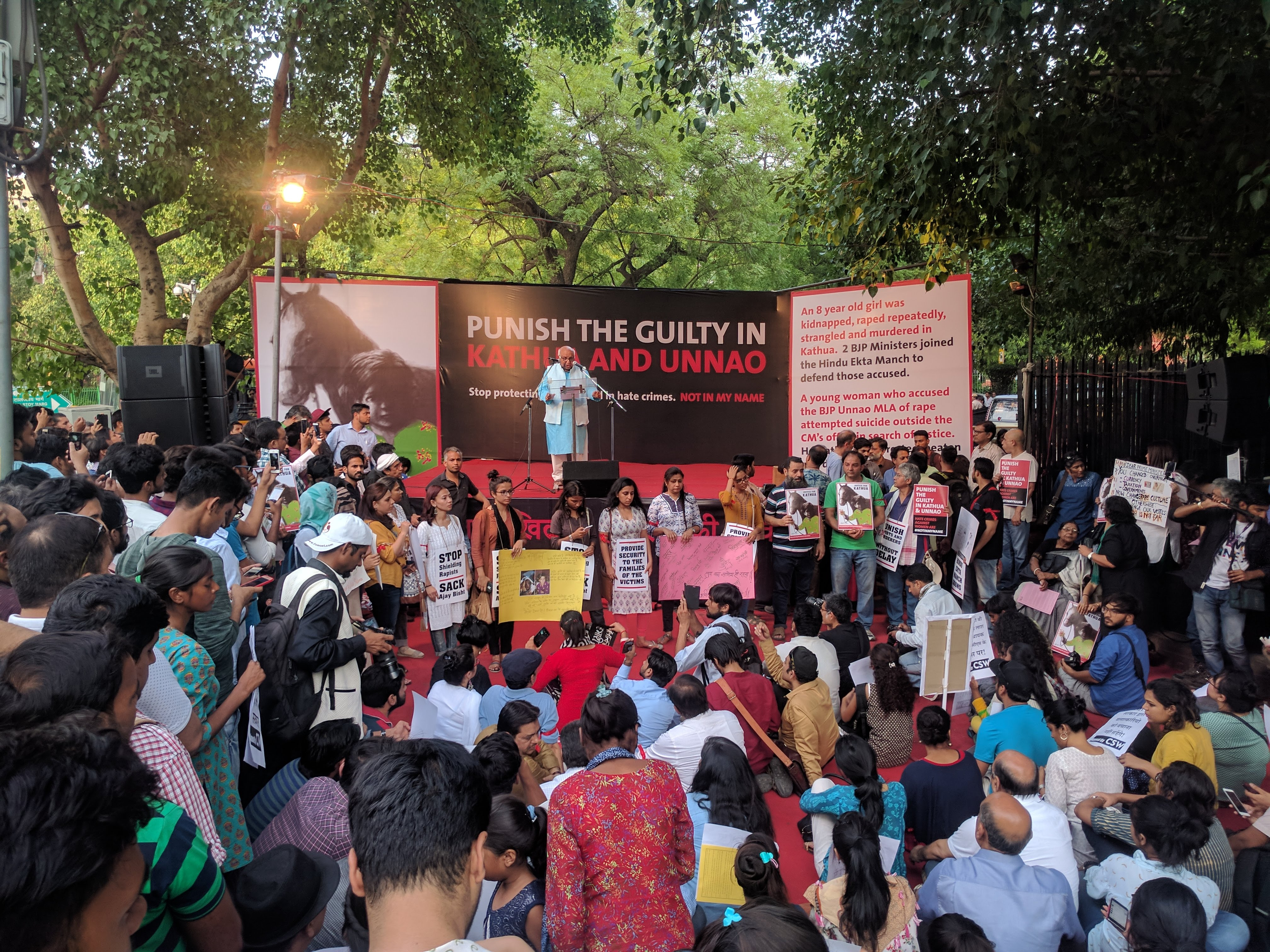
- Protests for the 2018 Kathua abduction, gang rape and murder case
- Location: 32.385°N 75.517°E; Rasana, Kathua district, Jammu & Kashmir, India
- Date: 10 January 2018- 17 January 2018
- Target: Asifa Bano
- Attack type: Abduction, gang rape, and murder
- Injuries: Sexual assault (gang rape)
- Victim: Asifa Bano
- Perpetrators: Six men and a juvenile
- Motive: Drive out the nomadic community of Bakarwals from Hiranagar, Kathua
- Accused: Sanji Ram; Deepak Khajuria; Tilak Raj; Arvind Dutta; Parvesh Kumar; Vishal Jangotra (son of Sanji Ram); A Juvenile (nephew of Sanji Ram)
- Verdict: Six of the seven accused were convicted
- Convictions: Sanji Ram, Deepak Khajuria and Parvesh Kumar were sentenced to life imprisonment of 25 years. Tilak Raj, Anand Dutta and Surender Verma were sentenced to five years in jail for destroying evidence. Court acquitted Vishal Jangotra due to lack of evidence. A juvenile, will be tried at a juvenile court.
- Convicted: Sanji Ram; Deepak Khajuria; Surender Verma; Tilak Raj; Anand Dutta; Parvesh Kumar

The Kathua rape case involved the abduction, gang rape, and murder of an 8-year-old Bakarwal girl, Asifa Bano, by seven males (six men and a juvenile) in January 2018 in the Rasana village of the Hiranagar tehsil of Kathua district, in the Jammu division of Jammu and Kashmir, India. A chargesheet for the case was filed, the accused were arrested and the trial began in Kathua on 16 April 2018. The victim belonged to the nomadic Bakarwal community, and the crime was a bid to terrorise the group off Jammu. She disappeared for a week before her body was discovered by the villagers a kilometer away from the village. The incident made national news when charges were filed against eight men in April 2018. The arrests of the accused led to protests seeking justice for the victim. The gang rape and murder, as well as the support the accused received especially from local officials of the Bharatiya Janata Party, sparked widespread outrage in India and world-wide.

On 10 June 2019, six of the seven defendants were convicted and one acquitted. Three of those convicted were sentenced to life imprisonment and the remaining three to five years.

== Incident ==
=== Complaint ===
The 5600-word chargesheet filed by a Senior Superintendent of Police of Jammu, states that on 12 January 2018, Mohammad Yusuf lodged a complaint in the Hiranagar police station stating that his daughter had gone missing. His complaint said that on 10 January 2018 his daughter, aged 8, had gone to watch over grazing horses at 12.30 p.m. She was seen at 2.00 p.m., but when the horses returned at 4.00 p.m., she was no longer with them. After searching for her and being unable to find her, her father registered a First Information Report (FIR) with the police.

=== Discovery and arrests ===
On 17 January 2018, the body of the victim was found and taken into custody by the police to allow an autopsy to be conducted. The postmortem was conducted by a team of doctors at the District Hospital in Kathua at 2:30 PM on the same day. On 22 January 2018, the investigation of the case was transferred to the Crime Branch and Crime Headquarters, Jammu and Kashmir. A statement released by the police listed seven individuals who had been arrested and charged over the crime, including four police officers. A total of eight people, including four police officers, were arrested. Two of the police officers were arrested on suspicion of attempting to destroy evidence and of accepting money to cover up the incident. One of the accused claimed to be 15 years old, though a medical examination later suggested he was 19. Sanji Ram, one of the accused, was described by the police as having devised the plan of kidnap and murder. The chargesheet against the seven adults accused of the crime was filed on 9 April. The accused were charged under Sections 302, 376, 201 and 120-B of the Ranbir Penal Code. A chargesheet against the remaining individual was under preparation.

=== Forensic evidence ===
The post-mortem revealed the presence of clonazepam in the body of the dead girl. The examination by the doctors found that the girl had been drugged with a sedative before she was raped and murdered. Forensic evidence suggested that she had been held for several days by Sanji Ram, one of the individuals accused of the crime. Strands of hair recovered from the temple matched those taken from the girl. The forensic examination stated that Bano had been raped multiple times by different men, and that she had been strangled to death, as well as hit in the head with a heavy stone.

The Delhi Forensic Science Laboratory analyzed 14 packets of evidence containing vaginal swabs, hair strands, blood samples of four accused, viscera of the deceased girl, the girl's frock and salwar, simple clay, and blood stained clay. Vaginal swabs matched with the DNA of the accused as did some other samples. Hair strands found in the temple where Asifa was raped matched that of the girl and the accused.

=== The accused ===
A retired former government official was the main accused. His son and also his nephew (a juvenile), were also accused in the case. Four other accused individuals were identified. The police contested the claim that the nephew was a juvenile. Vishal Jangotra claimed to be in Meerut attending an exam. However, according to the Central Forensic Science Laboratory (CFSL), his signature does not match the signature on the exam attendance sheet but based on purported CCTV footage, Vishal Jangotra was in a Muzaffarnagar ATM on the day of the crime.

== Aftermath ==
=== Communal tension ===
The incident resulted in widespread anger across Jammu and Kashmir. Following protests by members of the opposition, the state government handed over the investigation to the Crime Branch of the state police. The chargesheet filed by the police stated that the abduction of the victim was planned in an attempt to get personal revenge by the accused, as well as to intimidate the Bakarwal community into moving out of the area. The Bakarwal people are a nomadic tribal minority living in Kathua district. Local leaders of the Bharatiya Janata Party stated that the arrests had been made under political pressure, and asked for the crime to be probed by the Central Bureau of Investigation (CBI). Jammu and Kashmir Chief Minister Mehbooba Mufti, whose People's Democratic Party shares power in the state with the BJP, rejected the demand. News reports suggested that the demand for a CBI probe was an effort to make the investigation lenient on the accused; the CBI is a branch of the Indian Union government, controlled by the Indian Union government. Madhya Pradesh BJP President stated that militants from Pakistan were to blame for the rape and murder; his statement received criticism in the press.

The victim's community planned to bury her in a graveyard where they had purchased some land a few years previously. The victim's father stated that when the family attempted to bury Asifa, they were threatened with violence by right-wing activists, and were compelled to bury her in a different village.

=== Protests supporting the accused ===
Claims of right-wing groups staging protests against the arrests of the accused individuals were reported but never confirmed. Two ministers of the ruling Bharatiya Janata Party, Forest Minister Lal Singh Chaudhary and Industries Minister Chander Prakash, attended one of the protests. While attempting to file charges against the accused on 9 April, the Crime Branch police were met with protests from lawyers in front of the Chief Judicial Magistrate's office in Kathua. The lawyers were protesting in support of the Hindu Ekta Manch, and tried to prevent the charges from being filed; the chargesheet was submitted eventually after police reinforcements arrived. This support for individuals accused of rape led to widespread social outrage. An FIR was filed against lawyers protesting in support of Hindu Ekta Manch.

=== Fines for disclosing the identity of the victim ===
The Delhi High Court issued a fine of ₹ 10 lakhs (1 million) rupees on twelve media houses in India for disclosing the name of the rape victim as well as other details including the usage of photographs of the victim. This action by the High Court of New Delhi was taken suo-motu and under the Protection of Children from Sexual Offences Act, 2012 and the Indian Penal Code. The fine was to be paid within a week. The money collected from the fine has gone to the Jammu and Kashmir Victim Compensation Scheme.

The media houses included The Hindu, The Times of India, Republic TV, The Indian Express, The Week and NDTV. Lawyers representing media houses claim that the mistake was only made because there was a misunderstanding that the law in this case only extended to naming and revealing information related to rape survivors, and not rape victims. Following this, media houses across the country blanked out the name of the victim online in already published articles also.

== Trial ==
The trial for the Kathua murder and rape case began in Jammu and Kashmir on 16 April 2018 before the Principal Sessions Court judge, Kathua. The second hearing was scheduled for 28 April 2018. The Supreme Court sought a response from the Jammu and Kashmir government regarding shifting the trial to Chandigarh by 27 April 2018. A demand by Bhim Singh, leader of the Panthers Party, for an independent inquiry by the CBI was heard and denied by the Supreme Court of India.

On 7 May 2018, the Supreme Court of India shifted the case from Jammu and Kashmir to Pathankot. The Supreme Court instructed the trial to be fast-tracked. The trial was closed to the public and press according to orders from the Supreme Court. The trial also was held in-camera as per instructions from the Supreme Court.

The trial was being held under the Ranbir Penal Code, according to laws in Jammu and Kashmir.

On 14 November 2018, the family of the rape victim decided to drop their lawyer Deepika Rajawat. The application to remove the power of attorney was filed before the trial court in Pathankot, where the girl's father said Rajawat won't be representing them in the case anymore stating her security concerns and general lack of interest in the case. Over 100 hearings have taken place so far, but Deepika Rajawat was only present twice.

=== Sentencing ===
On 10 June 2019, six of the seven defendants were found guilty, and one was acquitted. Sanji Ram, Deepak Khajuria and Pravesh Kumar were sentenced to life imprisonment for 25 years, along with a fine of ₹1,00,000. The other three accused - Tilak Raj, Anand Dutta and Surender Verma were sentenced to five years in jail for destroying crucial evidence in the case. The court acquitted Sanji Ram's son, Vishal Jangotra due to lack of evidence. The eighth accused, Sanji Ram's juvenile nephew, was tried at a juvenile court.

=== FIR against SIT ===
On 22 October 2019, a Jammu court ordered an FIR to be filed against members of the J&K Crime Branch's Special Investigation Team (SIT), which probed the rape and murder in Kathua case. The order was based on a complaint from Sachin Sharma, Neeraj Sharma and Sahil Sharma alleging torture during interrogation to "provide false evidence" against one of the accused Vishal Jangotra, who was later acquitted in the case.

== Reactions ==
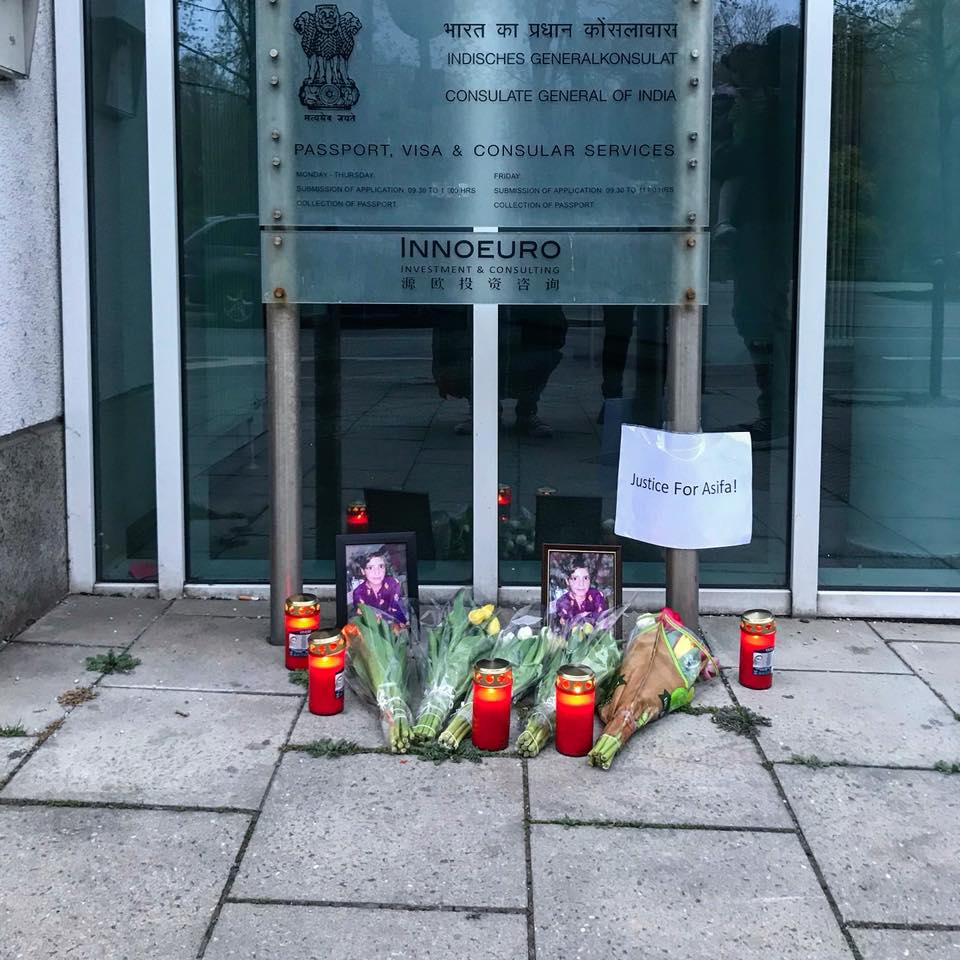
Memorial for the Kathua rape victim at the Indian Consulate in Munich, Germany

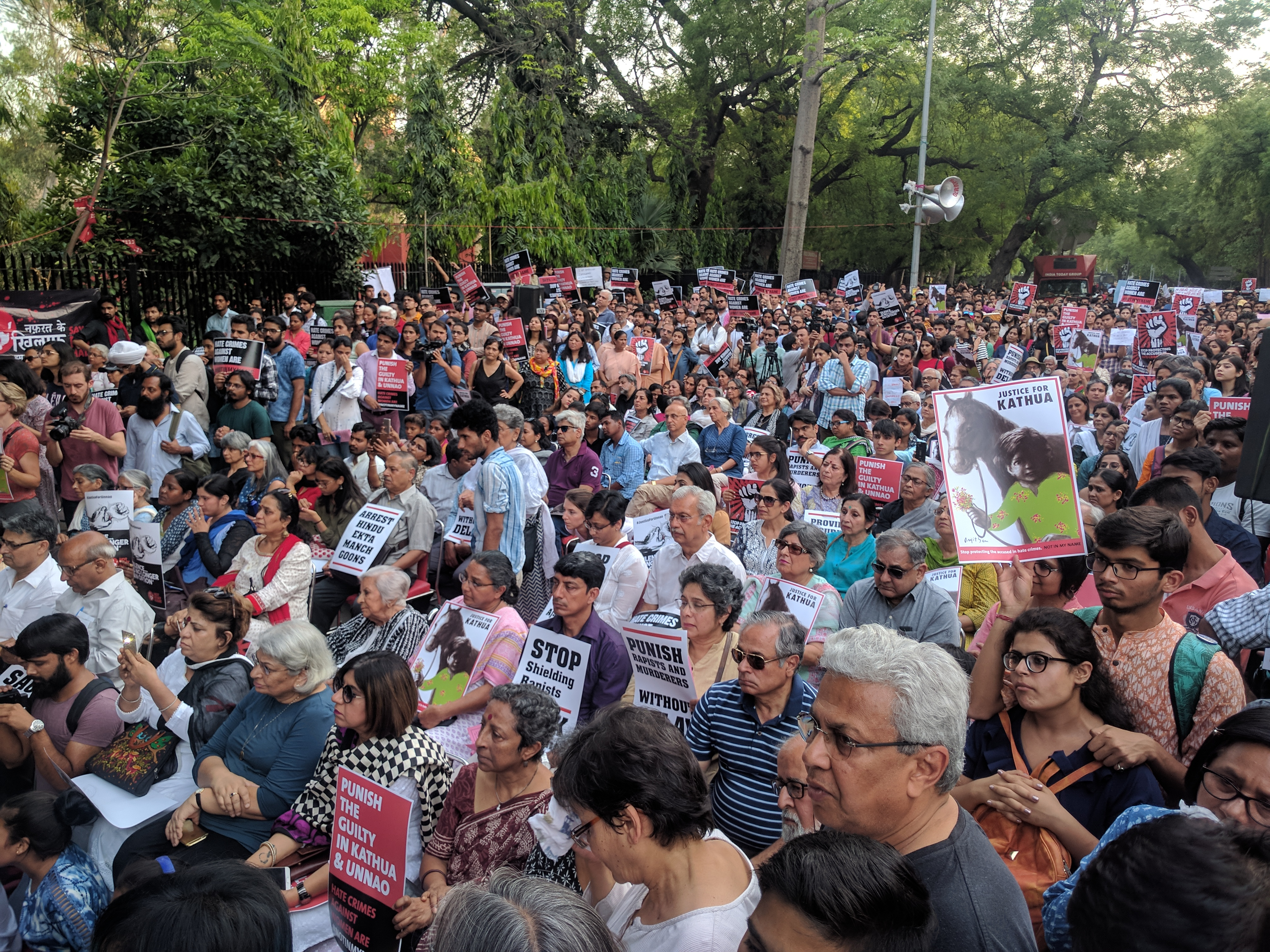
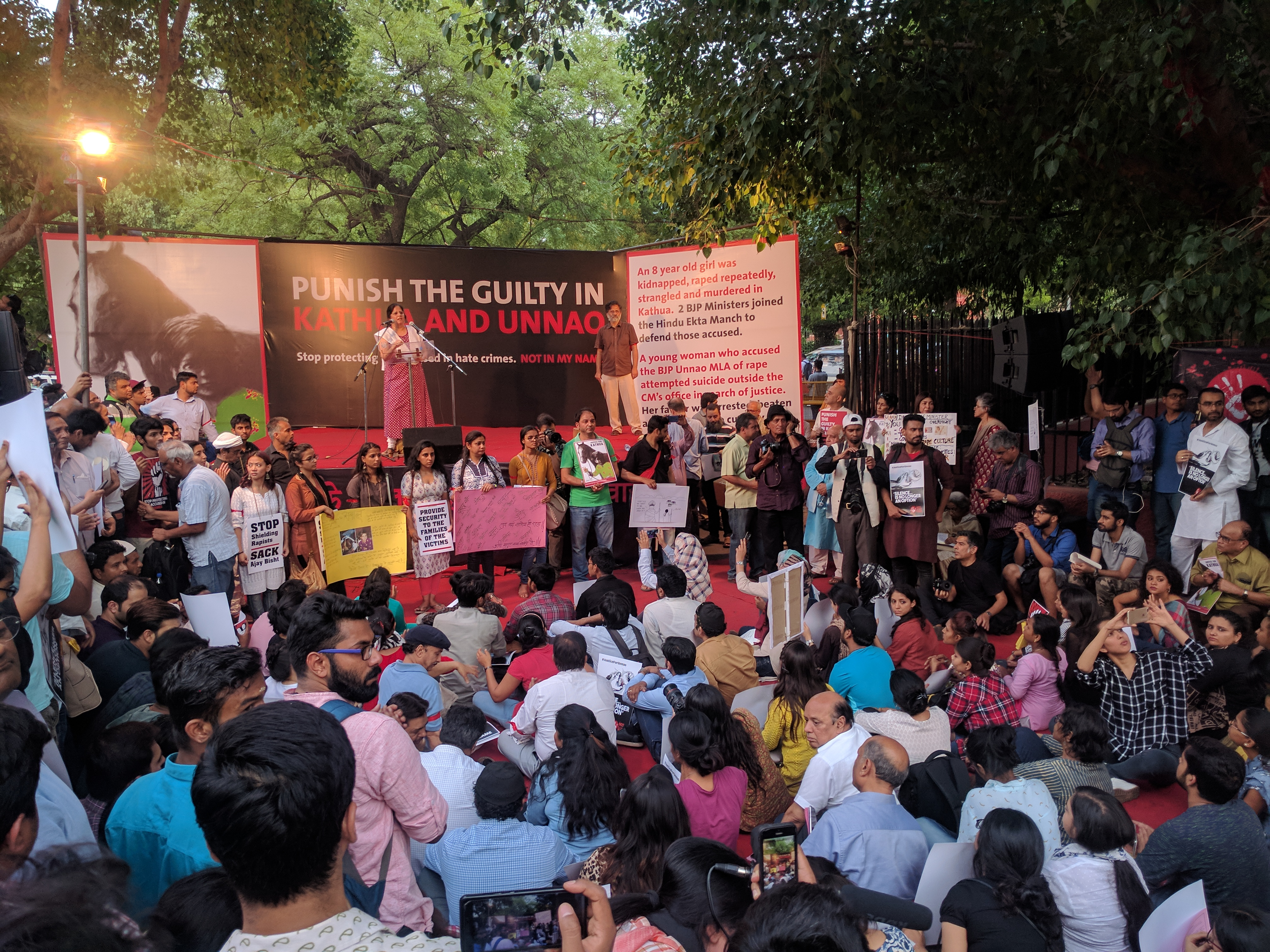
Joint protests for the Kathua rape case and Unnao rape case at Parliament Street, New Delhi on 15 April 2018.

The rape and murder drew widespread condemnation. On 18 January opposition parties in Jammu and Kashmir staged a walkout from the Legislative Assembly in protest of the incident. Various protests were held across Jammu and Kashmir. The arrests of the accused led to protests by the Panthers Party and other local groups, who sought justice for the victim. The rape and murder made headlines in India when the charges were filed in April.

Jammu and Kashmir Chief Minister Mehbooba Mufti stated that the investigation would be carried out quickly. Mufti also stated that the death penalty would be made mandatory for individuals convicted of raping a minor. Maneka Gandhi, the Indian Minister of Women and Child Development, also expressed support for the death penalty in cases of child rape, and stated that her ministry would move a Cabinet note to amend The Protection of Children from Sexual Offenses Act. Advocate Deepika Singh Rajawat took over the trial pro-bono for the victim's family.

On 13 April 2018, the Prime Minister of India, Narendra Modi, as well as the Supreme Court of India, made statements condemning the incident and said justice would be ensured. United Nations Secretary-General António Guterres stated that the "guilty must be held responsible" and described the incident as "horrific". The United Nations also expressed hopes that authorities will bring perpetrators to justice.

Several celebrities and prominent politicians voiced anger over the incident. On 12 April 2018, a candlelight march was held at India Gate, New Delhi. It was attended by Indian National Congress leaders including Rahul Gandhi, Sonia Gandhi, Ghulam Nabi Azad, and Priyanka Gandhi.

An assistant manager working for Kotak Mahindra Bank in Kerala, generated outrage on social media for condoning the rape on Facebook, and stating "it is better that [Asifa is] killed now otherwise she would have been a bomb tomorrow". He was later fired by the bank.

Due to the Kathua rape case and the 2017 Unnao rape case incidents coming to the limelight in the national discourse at the same time, joint protests for both the incidents were carried out together in various parts of the country such as Mumbai, Chennai, Kolkata and New Delhi.

Former minister, Harsh Dev Singh, led protests by the Panthers Party, demanding an independent CBI probe into the matter, that was refused by Chief Minister Mehbooba Mufti.

Raj Shrikant Thackeray of the Maharashtra Navnirman Sena criticized the BJP for "supporting the rapists" and "communalising the incident". He suggested sharia type punishment for the rapists. He said "These BJP leaders created Hindu Ekta Manch in Jammu which held a rally shouting slogans of Bharat Mata ki jai (translation: victory to mother India), waving the tricolour in favour of rapists. How can you even think of doing so? The eight-year-old innocent child was not even aware of her religion and had to undergo such pain. Here we have a party which is protecting the rapists".

== See also ==
- Rape in India
