= Aarambh India =

- Formation: 2012
- Founders: Uma Subramanian
- Type: Non Profit Organization
- Purpose: Child sexual abuse, Child-Friendly systems, Victim care & support
- Website: www.aarambhindia.org

Aarambh India is a non-profit initiative working in Mumbai, India. It focuses on child protection and issues related to child sexual abuse and exploitation. The organization was established in 2012. It partners with other organizations and stakeholders and works across levels from implementing the Protection of Children against Sexual Offences (POCSO) Act 2011 on the ground for organizing trainings and workshops, providing care and support to the victims and engage in research on child sexual abuse, public education and advocacy.

In 2014, Aarambh India launched its website which became India’s first online resource center on child sexual abuse. In 2016, it partnered with Internet Watch Foundation to launch India’s first internet hotline to report images and videos of child sexual abuse online.

== India's first hotline to report Child Pornography ==
Aarambh India partnered with Internet Watch Foundation and in September 2016 launched India’s first reporting button for child sexual abuse images and videos on the internet. The national hotline for reporting child sexual abuse imagery works closely with the government, police and internet industry in India and enables citizens to report offensive content anonymously. If the content reported is found to be illegal, it is blocked, taken down irrespective of where it is hosted and the information is shared with the police for prosecution. The removed content is assigned a unique identification number ensuring that it is not uploaded in the future.
