= Special courts in India =

Special Courts are specialized courts established by Parliament of India, under powers granted to it by article 247 of the Indian Constitution. These courts are usually established by Parliament to ensure speedy trial of the accused or to try certain offences under specific acts passed by parliament such as:

- Courts established under POCSO act
- Courts for MPs and MLA
- National Company Law Tribunal (NCLT) and Appellate Tribunal (NCLAT)
- Debt Recovery Tribunals (DRTs) and Appellate Tribunals (DRATs)
- Special Courts for Terrorist and Disruptive Activities
- National Green Tribunal (NGT)
- Special Courts for Money Laundering Cases
- Special Courts for Scheduled Castes and Tribes (Prevention of Atrocities) Act
- CBI courts
- NIA Courts
- Vigilance/Anti Corruption Courts

== Courts established under POCSO Act ==
Section 28 of the Protection of Children from Sexual Offences Act establishes Special Court to try a person accused of committing offences under the POCSO act. Initially National Commission for Protection of Child Rights (NCPCR) was responsible to monitor implementation of the Protection of Children from Sexual Offences (POCSO), but Supreme Court found that the National Commission for Protection of Child Rights (NCPCR), does not have any data on POCSO cases in the country. Hence, The Supreme Court has directed the Centre to set up special courts to deal exclusively with Protection of Children from Sexual Offences (POCSO) cases.

For the purposes of providing a speedy trial, the State Government shall in consultation with the Chief Justice of the High Court, by notification in the Official Gazette, designate for each district, a Court of Session to be a Special Court to try the offences under the Act

— Section 28 of The Protection Of Children From Sexual Offences Act, 2012

== MP-MLA Courts ==
On orders dated 01.11.2017 and 14.12.2017, Supreme Court of India directed the Union Government to set up special courts across the country to fast-track the long-pending trials of lawmakers. Following this order, the Union Government facilitated setting up of 12 Special Courts in States, for expeditious trial of criminal cases involving MP/MLAs. Accordingly, 12 Special Courts (02 in NCT of Delhi and 01 each in the state of UP, Bihar, WB, MP, Maharashtra, Karnataka, Andhra Pradesh, Telangana, Tamil Nadu and Kerala) were constituted. 10 Special Courts are presently functional in 9 States (Special court of Bihar and Kerala were discontinued as per direction of the apex court dated 04.12.2018). In September 2020, Supreme Court of India appointed amicus curiae, in his two reports, highlighted that despite the best efforts by the court to constitute special courts for trying cases against legislators, close to 4,442 criminal cases involving 2,556 sitting members of Parliament (MP) and members of legislative assemblies (MLAs) are pending.

== Special Courts for Terrorist and Disruptive Activities ==
All UAPA offences which are being investigated by NIA or State police are tried by Special Courts established under Section 22 of NIA act. Supreme Court of India clarified that the Special Court alone has exclusive jurisdiction to try such offences. Sessions court have jurisdiction to deal with such cases only if Special Court is not constituted as per NIA Act.

The State Government may constitute one or more Special Courts for the trial of offences under any or all the enactments specified in the Schedule.

— Section 22(1) of National Investigation Agency Act, 2008,

== Special Courts for Money Laundering Cases ==
Special Courts has been established under Section 43 of Prevention of Money Laundering Act (PMLA) to try offences committed by a person under Section 44 of this act.

The Central Government, in consultation with the Chief Justice of the High Court, shall, for trial of offence punishable under section 4, by notification, designate one or more Courts of Session as Special Court or Special Courts or such area or areas or for such case or class or group of cases as may be specified in the notification.

— Section 43, of PMLA

== Special Courts for Scheduled Castes and Tribes (Prevention of Atrocities) Act ==
Special court has been established under Section 14 of Scheduled Castes and Tribes (Prevention of Atrocities) Act to try offences specified in this act.

For the purpose of providing for speedy trial, the State Government shall, with the concurrence of the Chief Justice of the High Court, by notification in the Official Gazette, specify for each district a Court of Session to be a Special Court to try the offences under this Act.

— Section 14 of Scheduled Castes and Tribes (Prevention of Atrocities) Act, 1989

== CBI courts ==
Established under the Delhi Special Police Establishment Act, 1946, the CBI courts specifically deal with cases filed under the Central Bureau of Investigation (CBI), Unlike regular courts, the Judges here are 'elected', while the CBI Magistrate is an officer who is in rank of a Chief Judicial Magistrate or a Judicial Magistrate First Class.

== See also ==
- Judiciary of India
- Supreme Court of India
- Lawmaking Procedure in India
