= 2017 Unnao rape case =

Gang rape involving a politician in Unnao

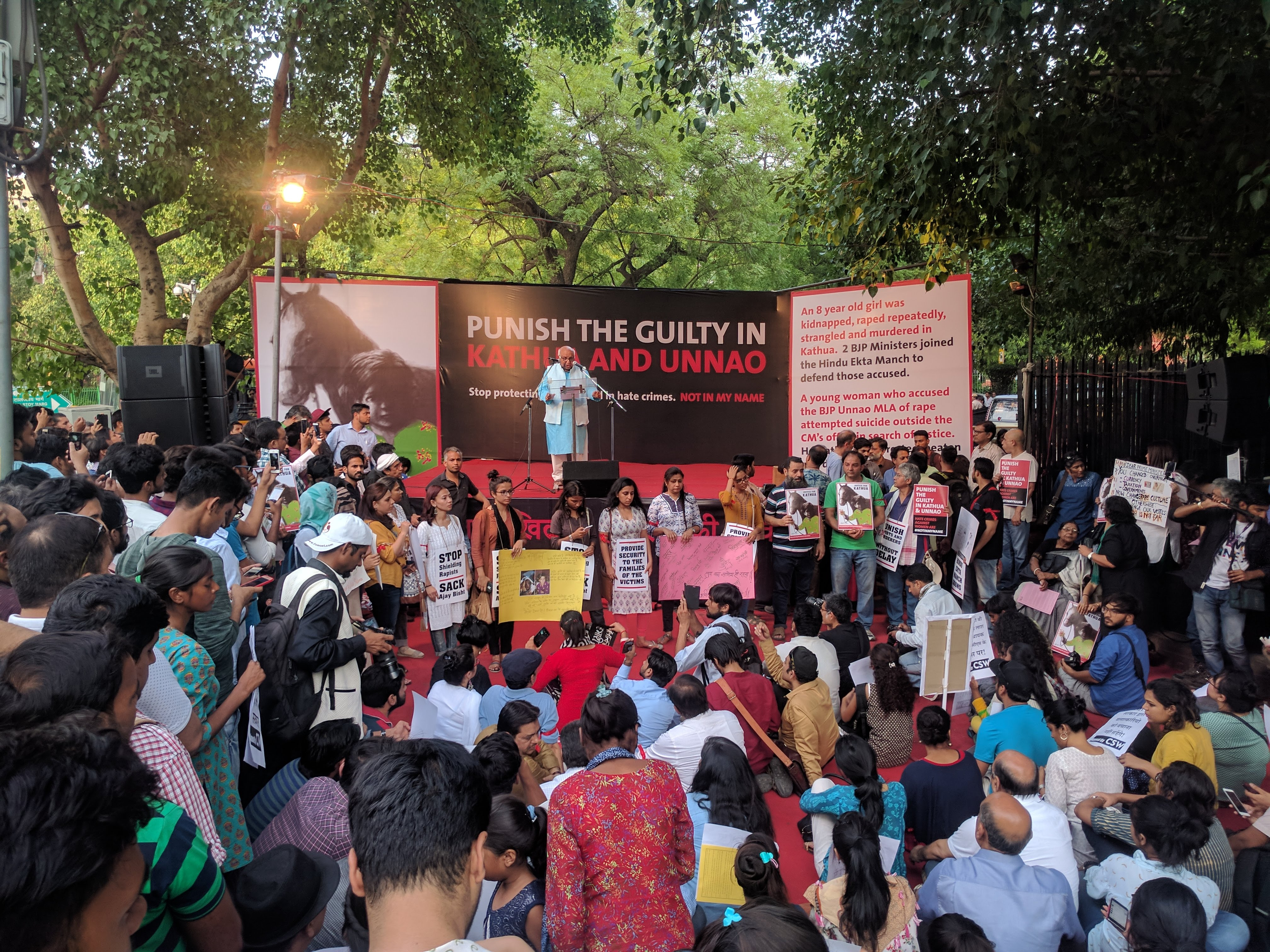
- Joint protests for the Unnao and Kathua rape case
- Location: Unnao, Uttar Pradesh, India
- Date: 4 June 2017
- Attack type: Rape, and murder
- Verdict: Life imprisonment
- Convicted: Kuldeep Singh Sengar

The Unnao rape case refers to the gang rape of a 17-year-old girl on 4 June 2017 in Unnao, Uttar Pradesh, India. On 16 December 2019, former BJP MLA Kuldeep Singh Sengar was convicted of the rape and on 20 December 2019 he was sentenced to life imprisonment. Sengar was also found guilty in the death of the girl's father in judicial custody.

Two chargesheets had been filed in this case. The first one was filed a full year after the rape, due to public pressure as the rape victim attempted to self-immolate at the residence of the Chief Minister of Uttar Pradesh. The first charge, filed by the Central Bureau of Investigation on 11 July 2018, accused Sengar, a former Member of the Legislative Assembly (MLA) from Uttar Pradesh, of the rape. The second was filed two days later accusing Sengar, his brother, three policemen and five other individuals of framing the rape survivor's father as the perpetrator.

Citing police inaction on rape case and her father's arrest on false charges, the rape survivor attempted to immolate herself at the residence of Yogi Adityanath, the Chief Minister of Uttar Pradesh, on 8 April 2018. Her father died in judicial custody shortly thereafter. These incidents brought public attention to the case, and the incident was widely reported on in the national media in April 2018. Another rape case, in Jammu and Kashmir, also received national attention during the same period, leading to joint protests seeking justice for both victims.

Following a truck collision on 28 July 2019, resulting in the serious injury of the victim and death of two relatives, it was revealed that the family had been threatened and had written to the Chief Justice of India for help. On 31 July 2019, the Supreme Court and Chief Justice acknowledged the case.

== Incident ==
=== Previous events ===
The victim stated that she was lured by a woman named Shashi Singh, her son, Shubham Singh, and her daughter, Nidhi Singh, to move to Kanpur with the allurement of securing employment. On the night of 11 June 2017, she went with Shubham Singh and later was allegedly raped multiple times by him and his driver, Awdhesh Tiwari. She was later assaulted by unknown individuals and allegedly sold to one Brajesh Yadav for ₹ 60,000. A First Information Report (FIR) was registered under section 363 and 366 of the Indian Penal Code (IPC) on 20 June 2017 against Shubham Singh and Awdhesh Tiwari. A day later, Uttar Pradesh Police located the victim in a village in Auraiya and sent her for a medical examination. On 22 June 2017, she recorded her statement in front of a Judicial Magistrate under Section 164 of the Code of Criminal Procedure (CrPC) in which she narrated her ordeal and named Shubham Singh, Awdhesh Tiwari, Brijesh Yadav and other unknown assailants for abduction and gang rape. A second FIR was registered later under the Protection of Children from Sexual Offences Act (POCSO) and the accused were subsequently detained.

=== Complaint ===
In an open letter written on 17 August 2017 to the Chief Minister of Uttar Pradesh, Yogi Adityanath, the victim stated that, prior to the events of 11 June, she had been raped on 4 June at 8:00 p.m. (IST) in the house of Sengar, a Member of the Legislative Assembly of Uttar Pradesh from the Unnao constituency, and a member of the Bharatiya Janata Party. The complaint said that she had entered the house seeking Sengar's assistance in finding employment. Her statement was recorded by the police on 22 June, but did not allow her to name her assailant. On 5 April 2018, the woman's father was arrested and placed in judicial custody, allegedly after he was assaulted by supporters of Sengar. A medical examination found injuries consistent with his having been beaten. He stated that Sengar's brother Atul had led the assault; no action was taken in response to this complaint at that time. Four days later, the victim attempted to immolate herself in front of the residence of Adityanath, stating that the police had taken no action against the accused. A day later, on 9 April, her father died in hospital of his injuries, leading to the arrest of Atul Sengar and the suspension of six police officers. The death and the immolation attempt led to widespread outrage, after which an FIR was registered against Sengar. The state government handed the case over to the Central Bureau of Investigation. The case was subsequently shifted to the Allahabad High Court.

=== Arrests ===
On 13 April 2018, Kuldeep Sengar was taken in by the CBI for questioning. Later in the day, on the basis of the Allahabad High Court order, he was arrested and spent a week in judicial custody, and new FIRs were registered. A second arrest in the case was made on 14 April of Shashi Singh, who allegedly took the survivor to Sengar on the same day as the incident.

The rape victim's uncle, who had started a campaign accusing Sengar of the rape of his niece and the death of the rape victim's father, his elder brother, in custody, was arrested on 21 November 2018 in an 18-year-old gun-firing case.

== Aftermath ==
=== Protests ===
The incident made headlines in India in April 2018. Joint protests were held across India demanding justice for both victims. The Prime Minister of India, Narendra Modi, issued a statement condemning the incidents. Following the truck collision on 28 July 2019, there were protests once again, including protests by the opposition in the Parliament on 30 July 2019.

=== Truck collision ===
On 28 July 2019, the rape victim and her lawyer were seriously injured and two of her family members died when a truck struck their car. The truck had blackened license plates, and the police officers assigned to provide security for the victim were not present, with the explanation that there was no space in the car in which the victim was traveling. These circumstances have led to the wide suspicion of a conspiracy to eliminate the witness and her family.

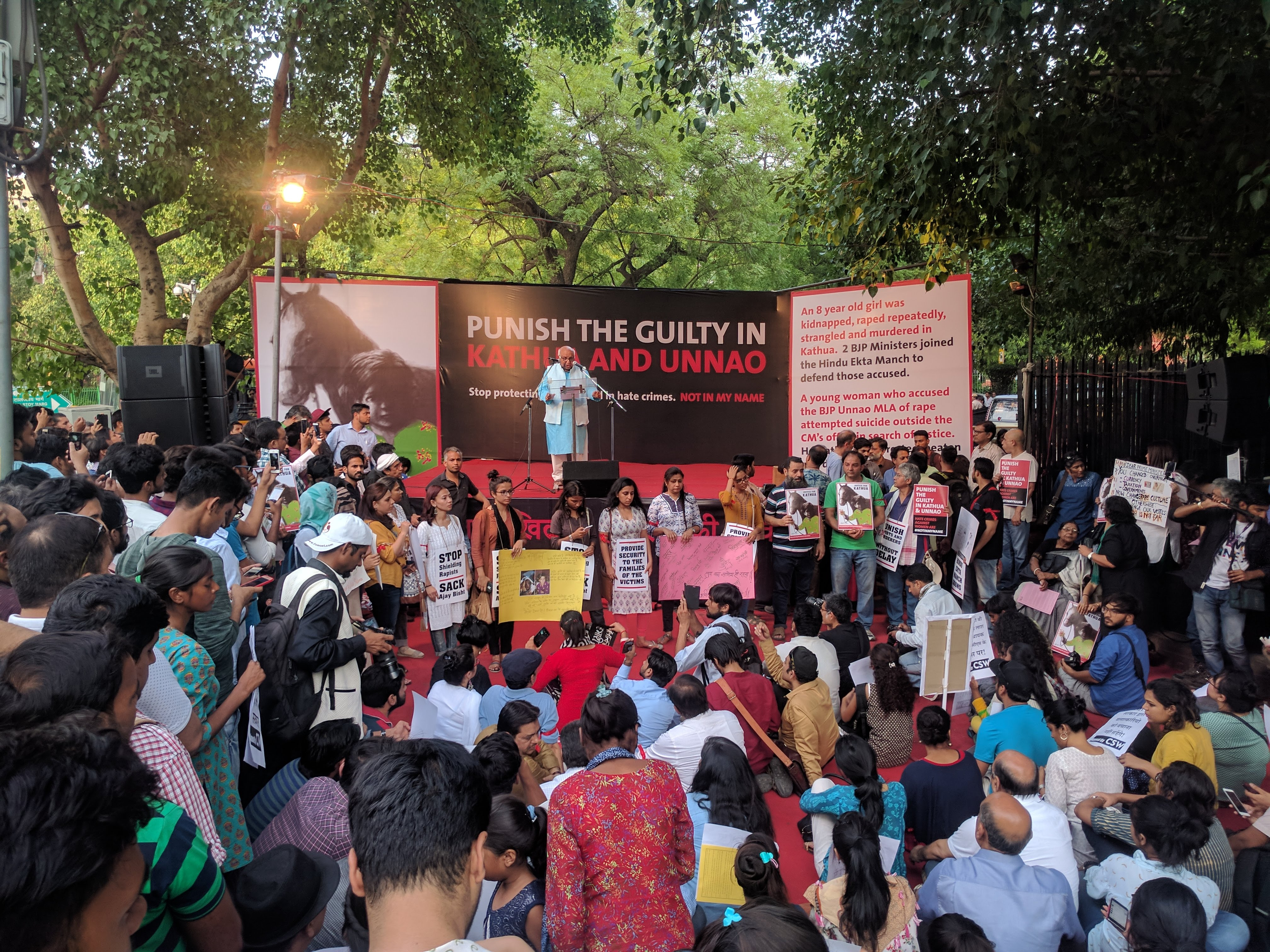
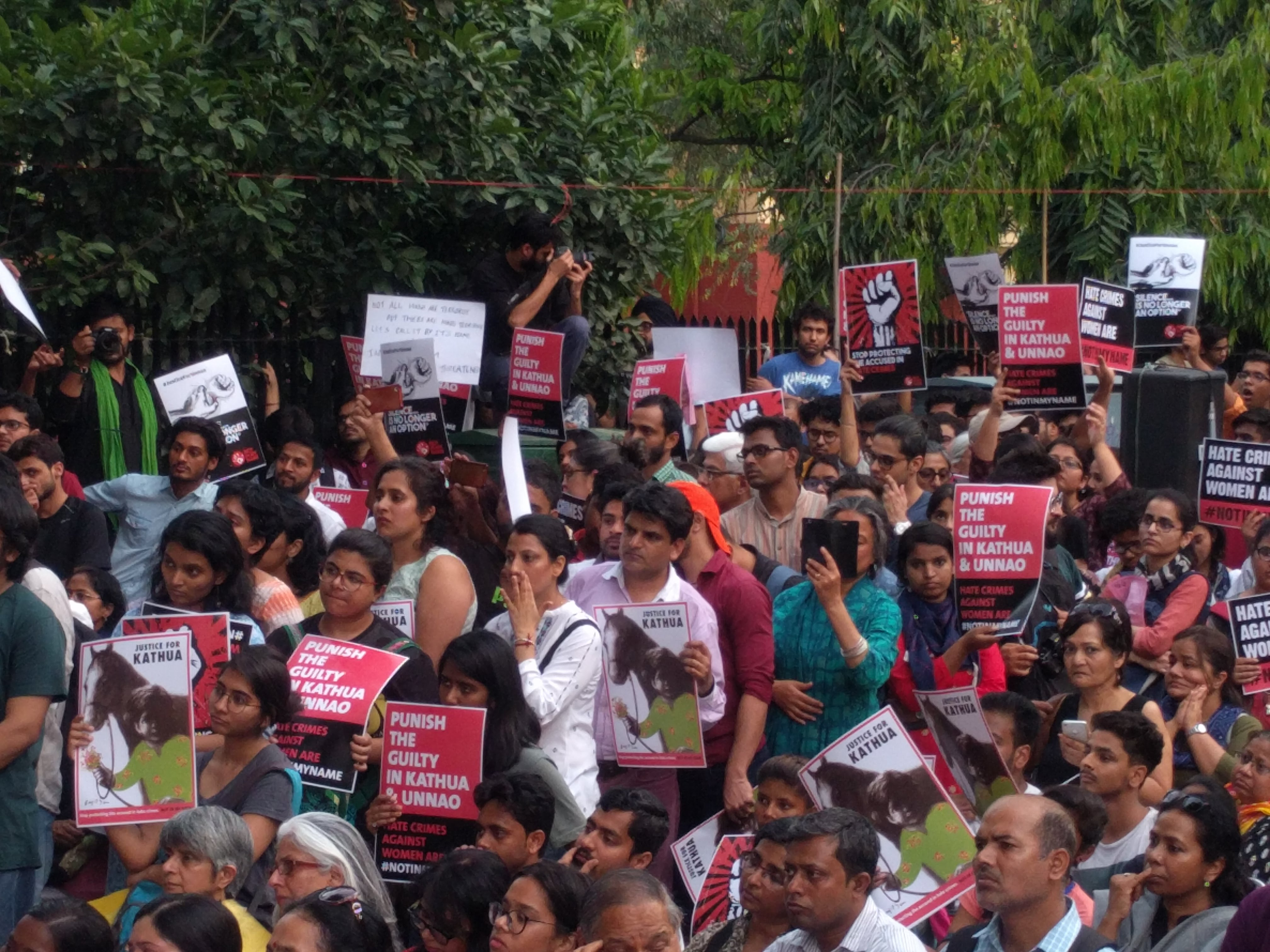
Joint protests for the Unnao rape case and Kathua rape case at Parliament Street, New Delhi on 15 April 2018.

=== Supreme Court Intervention ===
The Chief Justice of India was anguished by the events and, in view of the situation, the CJI-led bench of the Supreme Court ordered the transfer of a total of five cases related to the Unnao incident to Delhi in the court of the District & Sessions Judge, West District, Tis Hazari Court, and also directed protection to the victim's family members, her lawyer and his family members. The victim was also awarded ₹25 lakhs as interim compensation to be paid by the Uttar Pradesh Government.

Further, on 2 August 2019 the same bench also directed that Mahesh Singh, uncle of the rape victim and said to be a key witness in the case, be transferred to Tihar Jail in Delhi from Raebareli Jail.

== Conviction ==
On 16 December 2019, Sengar was convicted of the rape. On 20 December, he was sentenced to life imprisonment by a Delhi court and he was fined ₹25 lakh (equivalent to ₹31 lakh or US$32,000 in 2023) from which Rs 15 lakhs will be paid to the state government to meet the trial and prosecution expenses. Further in March 2020, Sengar was found "guilty of culpable homicide and criminal conspiracy in her father's death".

On 23 December 2025, the Delhi High Court suspended the life sentence and granted bail to Sengar pending appeal. The court directed the convict to furnish a personal bond with sureties of Rs 15 lakh and imposed conditions, including remaining in Delhi, not approaching within a radius of five kilometers of the survivor’s residence, and refraining from contacting, intimidating, or influencing the survivor or her family during the pendency of the appeal.

The order drew reactions from the survivor and her family, who expressed concerns regarding their safety. Protests were also reported in New Delhi following the decision. The CBI eventually appealed the decision to the Supreme Court, arguing that it undermines public trust and safety.

On 29 December 2025, the Supreme Court stayed the Delhi High Court order that suspended Sengar's life term.

== See also ==
- Pararia mass rape (1988)
