= Protection of Children from Sexual Offences Act, 2012 =

Indian law to protect children from molestation

Parliament of India
- Long title: An Act to protect children from offences of sexual assault, sexual harassment and pornography and provide for establishment of Special Courts for trial of such offences and for matters connected therewith or incidental thereto.
- Citation: Act No. 32 of 2012
- Territorial extent: whole of India
- Passed by: Rajya Sabha
- Passed: 10 May 2012
- Passed by: Lok Sabha
- Passed: 22 May 2012
- Assented to by: President Pratibha Patil
- Assented to: 19 June 2012
- Commenced: 14 November 2012

Legislative history

Initiating chamber: Rajya Sabha
- Bill title: Protection of Children from Sexual Offences Bill, 2011
- Bill citation: Bill No. XIV of 2011
- Introduced by: Krishna Tirath, MoS(IC) Women and Child Development
- Introduced: 23 March 2011
- Standing Committee on Human Resource Development: 29 March 2011–21 December 2011
- Passed: 10 May 2012

Revising chamber: Lok Sabha
- Passed: 22 May 2012

Amended by
- Criminal Law (Amendment) Act, 2013 (13 of 2013); Criminal Law (Amendment) Act, 2018 (22 of 2018); Protection of Children from Sexual Offences (Amendment) Act, 2019 (25 of 2019)
- Status: In force

The Protection of Children from Sexual Offences Act, 2012 (POCSO) is an Act of Parliament of India. It is aimed at preventing and prosecuting cases of child sexual abuse. The Parliament of India passed the POCSO bill on 22 May 2012. The POCSO Rules, formulated by the government in accordance with the law has also been notified in November 2012.

The objective of the Act is to provide a robust legal framework for the protection of children from offences of sexual assault, sexual harassment and pornography, while safeguarding the interest of the child at every stage of the judicial process. The Act has provisions for child-friendly processes for reporting, recording of evidence and investigation, and also for speedy trial of cases through designated Special Courts.

Protection of children by the state is guaranteed to Indian citizens by an expansive reading of Article 21 of the Indian constitution. India has also been a signatory to the UN Convention on the Rights of the Child. Demand for stringent laws for dealing with child sexual abuse is frequently made in India.

== Laws before POCSO ==
Goa Children's Act, 2003, was the only specific piece of child abuse prevention legislation before the 2012 Act. Child sexual abuse was prosecuted under the following sections of the Indian Penal Code:

- I.P.C. (1860) 375 - Rape
- I.P.C. (1860) 354 - Outraging the modesty of a woman
- I.P.C. (1860) 377 - Unnatural offences

However,

- IPC 375 did not protect male victims or anyone from sexual acts of penetration other than "traditional" peno-vaginal intercourse.
- IPC 354 lacked a statutory definition of "modesty". It carries a weak penalty and is a compoundable offence. Further, it does not protect the "modesty" of a male child.
- IPC 377 did not define the term "unnatural offences". It only applies to victims penetrated by their attacker's sex act, and is not designed to criminalise sexual abuse of children.

== Provisions of the POCSO Act ==
=== Offences under the Act ===
The POCSO Act specifies a variety of offences under which an accused can be punished. It recognizes forms of penetration other than penile-vaginal penetration and criminalizes acts of immodesty against children too. Offences under the Act include:

- Penetrative Sexual Assault: Insertion of penis/object/another body part in child's vagina/urethra/anus/mouth, or asking the child to do so with them or some other person
- Sexual Assault: When a person touches the child with sexual intent, or makes the child touch them or someone else
- Sexual Harassment: passing sexually cultured remark, sexual gesture/noise, repeatedly following, flashing, sexting etc.
- Child Sexual Abuse Material, CSAM (formerly referred to by the deprecated term child pornography)
- Aggravated Penetrative Sexual Assault/ Aggravated Sexual Assault

The Act is gender-neutral, both for children and for the accused. With respect to pornography, the Act also criminalizes watching or collection of pornographic content involving children. The Act also makes abetment (encouragement) of child sexual abuse an offence.

In 2019, the Act was amended and made more stringent, by raising the minimum punishment for penetrative assault from 7 to 10 years and 20 years if the victim was below 16 years in age, with a maximum punishment of life imprisonment with a provision for the death penalty for aggravated penetrative assault.

=== Child-friendly process ===
It also provides for various procedural reforms, making the tiring process of trial in India considerably easier for children. The child friendly process aims to minimize trauma felt by the victim, eliminate the possibility of revictimization and to protect against intimidation.

A Victim of Child Sexual Abuse can file a complaint at any time irrespective of his/her present age.

=== Role of Child Welfare Committee ===
A sexually abused child is considered as "child in need of care and protection" under Juvenile Justice (Care and Protection of Children) Act, 2015. Police officer should therefore inform the Child Welfare Committee (CWC) about every case under the Act within 24 hours. CWC can appoint a support person for the child who will be responsible for psycho-social well-being of the child. This support person will also liaise with the police, and keep the child and child's family informed about progress in the case. Reporting can be done through the toll free number 1098.

== Contention around implementation of the POCSO Act ==
=== Contradiction with the Medical Termination of Pregnancy Act, 1971 ===
The Protection of Children from Sexual Offences Act was passed to strengthen legal provisions for the protection of children below 18 years of age from sexual abuse and exploitation. Under this Act, if any girl under 18 is seeking abortion the service provider is compelled to register a complaint of sexual assault with the police. However, under the Medical Termination of Pregnancy Act, it is not mandatory to report the identity of the person seeking an abortion. Consequently, service providers are hesitant to provide abortion services to girls under 18.

=== Mandatory reporting ===
According to the Act, every crime of child sexual abuse should be reported. If a person who has information of any abuse fails to report, they may face imprisonment up to six months or may be fined or both. Many child rights and women rights organizations have criticized this provision. According to experts, this provision takes away agency of choice from children. There may be many survivors who do not want to go through the trauma of the criminal justice system, but this provision does not differentiate. Furthermore, mandatory reporting may also hinder access to medical aid, and psycho-social intervention. It contradicts the right to confidentiality for access to medical, and psychological care.

=== Definition of child ===
The Act defines a child as a person under the age of 18 years. However, this definition is a purely biological one, and does not take into account people who live with intellectual and psycho-social disability.

A recent case had been filed in the SC where a woman, whose biological age was 38 years but with mental age of 6 years, was raped. The victim's advocate argued that "failure to consider the mental age will be an attack on the very purpose of act." SC held that the Parliament has felt it appropriate that the definition of the term “age” by chronological age or biological age to be the safest yardstick, rather than referring to a person having intellectual disability. The court said while awarding maximum compensation to a rape victim who is 38 years old with a mental maturity of 6 to 8 years but rejecting the plea that the victim's age should be taken not just in physical terms, but also take into account her mental age as well. The victim has cerebral palsy.

=== Legal aid ===
Section 40 of the Act allows victims to access legal aid. However, that is subject to Code of Criminal Procedure. In other words, the lawyer representing a child can only assist the Public Prosecutor, and file written final arguments if the judge permits. Thus, the interest of the victim is often unrepresented.

=== Criminalization of consensual relationships ===
The law presumes that all sexual acts with children under the age of 18 is a sexual offence, this also includes sexual acts where both the individuals are under the age of 18. Therefore, two adolescents who engage in consensual sexual acts will also be punished under this law; this coupled with the need for mandatory reporting has led to the criminalisation of consensual relationships between adolescents. This is especially a concern where an adolescent is in a relationship with someone from a different caste, or religion. Parents have filed cases under this Act to 'punish' relationships they do not approve of. In a 2015 analysis of 142 sexual assault cases in sessions courts of Mumbai, police were found misusing the act in 33 cases, by classifying women who were 18 years old as being between 15 and 18 years of age in their FIRs, in order to criminalise consenting relationships at the request of the parents of the girl.

In contrast to the 2011 act, an earlier draft of the bill in 2001 did not punish consensual sex if at least one of the partners were above the age of 16, as did section 375 of the Indian Penal Code. The change from this to the age of 18 in the final act was criticized at the time as it was feared that this would allow and encourage unjustified complaints aimed at penalizing consensual relationships.

== Landmark Judgments under POCSO Act, 2012 ==
=== Supreme Court of India ===
- Sakshi v. Union of India
- Independent Thought v. Union of India
- Attorney General for India v. Satish and another (2021)
- Alakh Alok Srivastava v. Union of India and Others (2018)

== Cases in News ==
- Delta Meghwal rape case
- 2017 Unnao Rape Case
- 2021 Sexual Assault Rulings by (then) Judge Pushpa Virendra Ganediwala
- 2014 Badaun gang rape allegations
- Muzaffarpur shelter case
- Kathua rape case
- 2022 Hyderabad gang rape

== Organisations working with victims of Child Sexual Abuse ==
- Aarambh India
- Childline India
- Tulir NGO
- HAQ Centre for child Rights
- Arpan

== See also ==
- Child sexual abuse
- Law of India
- Child Sexual Abuse in India
- Ministry of Women and Child Development
