= Orissa Lok Adalat =

Alternative dispute resolution mechanism in India

Orissa State Legal Services Authority

Jurisdictional structure
- Federal agency: India
- Operations jurisdiction: India
- General nature: Federal law enforcement

Operational structure
- Headquarters: Orissa Lok Adalat, High Court Of Odisha, Chandini Chowk, Cuttack, Odisha 753002Email-highcourt.or@nic.in, cpc-ori@aij.gov.in.
- Agency executive: Hon'ble Dr. Justice S. Muralidhar., Chief Justice, Orissa High Court and Patron Orissa State Legal Services Authority.

Website
- orissahighcourt.nic.in/about-orissa-high-court/history/

Orissa Lok Adalat or Orissa State Legal Services Authority (People's Court) is a statutory and autonomous body and an alternative dispute resolution mechanism used in the state of Orissa. The Orissa Lok Adalat Act is designed to provide constitutional protection guaranteed under Article 14 and 39-A of the Constitution of India, of “ACCESS TO JUSTICE FOR ALL”. It is a legal system to resolve pending cases at the Panchayat or rural places, those in a pre-litigation stage in courts are resolved amicably.

It is recognised as a statutory authority under the Legal Services Authorities Act, 1987 and the Lok Adalats award or decision is deemed to be a civil court case and final and enforceable on both parties. Such an award is not appealable in any court of law in the absence of any provision. However, by approaching the court of appropriate jurisdiction, litigation can be initiated by any party in the suit if any of them are dissatisfied with the decision of the Lok Adalat (in the absence of any provision for appeal against such an award).

"Section 22 B of The Legal Services Authorities Act 1987 provides for the establishment of Permanent Lok Adalats (PLA) for exercising jurisdiction in respect of one or more public utility services (PUS). Section 22 A of The Legal Services Authorities Act 1987 states what constitutes 'Public Utility Services' for the purpose of Permanent Lok Adalat".

== History and Administration ==
Orissa Lok Adalat was formed under the Legal Services Authorities Act, 1987 and to implement the provisions of the Constitution which had been drafted to help every citizen to get justice irrespective of their economic or other limitations. The primary value laid down as per Indian Constitutional philosophy is individual dignity which forms the basis of human rights and demands on a holistic basis of civil, political, economic, social, and cultural rights.

Orissa Lok Adalat is formed with the objective and purpose of ensuring and providing visible, practical and positive initiatives ensuring equality and non-biased decisions as laid down in the Constitution of India and assumes significance due to illiteracy and poverty prevalent in India.

Lok Adalats are constituted at the following levels:

- State Authorities.
- High Court.
- District and Taluk level.

1. Chairman.

2. Secretaries.

- Mandal Committees.
- Mediation Centres.

Types of Lok Adalat:

- Permanent Lok Adalat - Provides a mechanism for adjudging cases referred under public utility services like transport, postal and telegraph.
- National Lok Adalat - Held from the year 2015, every month on a specific topic across India. These are held on a single day disposing off large number of pending cases.
- Mega Lok Adalat - Held across all courts in the state in a single day.
- Mobile Lok Adalats - These types of Lok Adalats are organised occasionally which travel from one place to another across the country occasionally and help resolve disputes.

Mr Justice S. Muralidhar, Chief Justice, Orissa High Court, is the current patron and Chief of Orissa Lok Adalat.

== Lok Adalat Committee and Complaint Procedures ==
Lok Adalat settles disputes which can be mutually resolved and mostly relate to matrimonial, damages and partition suits. The following are the requirements of the cases before the Lok Adalat:

- Lok Adalat takes up cases which are civil in nature (including marriage, and family disputes) and compoundable criminal cases.
- It accepts cases pending in regular courts under its jurisdiction.
- The main condition of the Lok Adalat is that both parties in dispute agree for settlement.
- The court fee paid initially in the court for the complaints/petition is refunded to the parties, as no court fee is chargeable if a matter referred in the Lok Adalat and is resolved with the parties agreeing to be bound by it.
- Procedural laws and the Evidence Act are not strictly followed while assessing claims.
- Decisions are binding on the parties and its order is capable of execution through legal process.

The following types of cases can be admitted in Lok Adalat.

1. Any dispute or case pending in any court of law in India.

- Criminal offences which are compoundable.
- Cases under section 138 of the Negotiable Instruments Act.
- Issues relating to the recovery of money.
- Issues under the Indian Motor Vehicles Act,1988.
- Issues relating to labour disputes.
- Issues relating to public utility bills like electricity, water etc. excluding Non-compoundable offences.
- Issues relating to Matrimony.

2. Any dispute planned to be filed in Court but did not come up for hearing in front of it. Following Pre-Litigation cases can also be filed in Lok-Adalat.

- Cases under section 138 of the Negotiable Instruments Act.
- Cases relating to the recovery of money.
- Issues relating to labour disputes.
- Issues relating to public utility bills like electricity, water etc. excluding Non-compoundable offences.
- General Maintenance-related disputes.
- Other Miscellaneous cases which are civil disputes, criminal compoundable cases and matrimonial disputes.

However, any legal issue which is not compoundable as per the Indian Legal Systems cannot be taken up in the Lok Adalat.

As the members are presiding over the Lok Adalat as statutory conciliators and not in a judicial capacity they can only persuade the parties to come to a settlement. Sometimes counselling sessions are also held between opposing parties. The main condition of the Lok Adalat is that both parties in dispute agree to a settlement and if they are unable to do so, it is referred to the Permanent Lok Adalat for deciding the case provided the case is not related to a compoundable offence.

Orissa Lok Adalat, as per the Supreme Court judgement, is formed to arrive at a compromise or solution between parties in dispute and hence does not have jurisdiction to go into the merits of the complaint.

== Details of cases Resolved ==
- Orissa Lok Adalat organised the first E-Lok Adalat in September 2020 in which 2061 cases which were at the pre-litigation stage were resolved.
- Orissa Lok Adalat had resolved 2232 cases in E-Lok Adalat organised between June and September 2020.

== See also ==
- Gram Nyayalayas Act, 2008
- Legal Services Authorities Act 1987
