= Assam Lok Adalat =

Dispute resolution mechanism in India

Assam Legal Services Authority

Agency overview
- Formed: 1987

Jurisdictional structure
- Federal agency: India
- Operations jurisdiction: India
- General nature: Federal law enforcement

Operational structure
- Headquarters: Adjacent to Gauhati High Court New Block, Guwahati - 781001
- Agency executive: Mr. Justice Sudhanshu Dhulia., Chief Justice, Gauhati High Court, Guwahati.

Website
- https://aslsa.assam.gov.in/contact-us

Assam Lok Adalat or Assam State Legal Services Authority (People's Court) is an statutory and autonomous body and an alternative dispute resolution mechanism used in the state of Assam. The Assam Lok Adalat Act is designed to provide constitutional protection guaranteed under Article 14 and 39-A of the Constitution of India, of "ACCESS TO JUSTICE FOR ALL". It is a legal system to resolve pending cases at Panchayat or rural places, those in a pre-litigation stage in courts are resolved amicably. It is recognised as statutory authority under the Legal Services Authorities Act, 1987 and the Lok Adalats award or decision are deemed to be civil court case and final and enforceable on both parties. Such an award is not appealable in any court of law in the absence of any provision. However, by approaching the court of appropriate jurisdiction, litigation can be initiated by any party in the suit if any of them are dissatisfied with the decision of the Lok Adalat (in the absence of any provision for appeal against such award).

"Section 22 B of The Legal Services Authorities Act 1987 provides for the establishment of Permanent Lok Adalats (PLA) for exercising jurisdiction in respect of one or more public utility services (PUS). Section 22 A of The Legal Services Authorities Act 1987 states what constitutes 'Public Utility Services' for the purpose of Permanent Lok Adalat".

== History and administration ==
Assam Lok Adalat formed under Legal Services Authorities Act, 1987 and to implement the provisions of Constitution which had been drafted to help every citizen to get justice irrespective of their economic or other limitations. The primary value laid down as per Indian Constitutional philosophy is individual dignity which forms the basis of human rights and demands on a holistic basis of civil, political, economical, social, and cultural rights.

Assam Lok Adalat is formed with objective and purpose of ensuring and providing visible, practical and positive initiatives ensuring equality and non bias decisions as laid down in the Constitution of India and assumes significance due to illiteracy and poverty prevalent in India.

Lok Adalats are constituted at below levels:

- State Authorities.
- High Court.
- District and Taluk level.

1. Chairman.

2. Secretaries.

- Mandal Committees.
- Mediation Centres.

Types of Lok Adalat:

- Permanent Lok Adalat - Provides mechanism for adjudging cases referred under public utility services like transport, postal and telegraph.
- National Lok Adalat - Held from year 2015, every month on specific topic across India. These are held on a single day disposing off large number of pending cases.
- Mega Lok Adalat - Held across all courts in state in a single day.
- Mobile Lok Adalats - These types of Lok Adalats are organised occasionally which travel from one place to other across country occasionally and help resolving disputes.

Mr. Justice Vijay Bishnoi, Chief Justice, Gauhati High Court, Guwahati is current patron in Chief of Assam Lok Adalat.

== Lok Adalat committee and complaint procedures ==
Lok Adalat settles disputes which can be mutually resolved and mostly relating to matrimonial, damages and partition suits. The following are the requirements of the cases before Lok Adalat:

- Lok Adalat takes up cases which are civil in nature (including marriage, and family disputes) and compoundable criminal cases.
- It accepts cases pending in regular court under their jurisdiction.
- The main condition of the Lok Adalat is that both parties in dispute agree for settlement.
- The court fee paid initially in the court for the complaints/petition is refunded to the parties, as no court fee is chargeable if a matter referred in the Lok Adalat and is resolved with parties agreeing to bind by it.
- Procedural laws and the Evidence Act are not strictly followed while assessing claims.
- Decisions are binding on the parties and its order is capable of execution through legal process.

The following types of cases can be admitted in Lok Adalat.

1. Any dispute or case pending in any court of law in India.

- Criminal offences which are compoundable.
- Cases under section 138 of Negotiable Instruments Act.
- Issues relating to recovery of money.
- Issues under Indian Motor Vehicles Act, 1988.
- Issues relating to labour disputes.
- Issues relating to public utility bills like electricity, water etc excluding Non Compoundable offences.
- Issues relating to Matrimony.

2. Any dispute to be planned to filed in Court but did not come up for hearing in front of it. Following Pre-Litigation cases can also be filed in Lok-Adalat.

- Cases under section 138 of Negotiable Instruments Act.
- Cases relating to recovery of money.
- Issues relating to labour disputes.
- Issues relating to public utility bills like electricity, water etc excluding Non Compoundable offences.
- General Maintenance related disputes.
- Other Miscellaneous cases which are civil disputes, criminal compoundable cases and matrimonial disputes.

However, any legal issue which is not compoundable as per the Indian Legal Systems cannot be taken up in the Lok Adalat.

As the members are presiding Lok Adalat as statutory conciliators and not in judicial capacity they can only persuade the parties to come to a settlement. Sometimes counselling sessions are also held between opposing parties.

The main condition of the Lok Adalat is that both parties in dispute agree for settlement and if they are unable to do so, it is referred to the Permanent Lok Adalat for deciding the case provided the case is not related to compoundable offence.

Assam Lok Adalat, as per Supreme Court judgement, is formed to arrive at a compromise or solution between parties in dispute and hence does not have jurisdiction to go into merits of complaint.

== Details of cases resolved ==
1. Assam Lok Adalat or ASLSA (Assam State Legal Services Authority), with the support from NALSA (National Legal Services Authority), had joined other states of India, and conducted National Lok Adalat for one day on September 11, helping resolve many pending legal cases.

2. In July 2021, Assam Lok Adalat or ASLSA (Assam State Legal Services Authority), with the support from NALSA (National Legal Services Authority), conducted second National Lok Adalat through hybrid and virtual method.

== See also ==
- Gram Nyayalayas Act, 2008
- Legal Services Authorities Act 1987
