= Pondicherry Lok Adalat =

Dispute resolution mechanism in the Indian Union Territory

Pondicherry Legal Services Authority

Jurisdictional structure
- Federal agency: India
- Operations jurisdiction: India
- General nature: Federal law enforcement

Operational structure
- Headquarters: Pondicherry

The Pondicherry Lok Adalat or Pondicherry Legal Services Authority (People's Court) is a statutory and autonomous body and an alternative dispute resolution mechanism used in the Indian Union Territory of Pondicherry. The Pondicherry Lok Adalat Act is designed to provide constitutional protection guaranteed under Article 14 and 39-A of the Constitution of India, of "Access to justice for all". It is a legal system used to resolve pending cases at panchayats or rural locales. It is recognised as statutory authority under the Legal Services Authorities Act, 1987 and Lok Adalat awards or decisions are deemed to be civil court cases that are final and enforceable on both parties. Such awards are not appealable in any court of law in the absence of any provision. However, by approaching the court of appropriate jurisdiction, litigation can be initiated by any party in the suit if any of them are dissatisfied with the decision of the Lok Adalat (in the absence of any provision for appeal against such award).

"Section 22 B of the Legal Services Authorities Act 1987 provides for the establishment of Permanent Lok Adalats (PLA) for exercising jurisdiction in respect of one or more public utility services (PUS). Section 22 A of the Legal Services Authorities Act 1987 states what constitutes 'Public Utility Services' for the purpose of Permanent Lok Adalat".

== History and administration ==
The Pondicherry Lok Adalat was formed under the 1987 Legal Services Authorities Act in order to implement constitutional provisions that had been drafted to help citizens obtain justice irrespective of their economic or other limitations. The primary value laid down as per Indian constitutional philosophy is individual dignity, which forms the basis of human rights and demands on a holistic basis of civil, political, economic, social, and cultural rights.

The Pondicherry Lok Adalat is formed with the objective of ensuring and providing visible, practical, and positive initiatives ensuring equal and unbiased decisions as laid down in the constitution of India; it assumes significance due to the illiteracy and poverty prevalent in the country.

Lok Adalats are constituted at the following levels:

- State authorities
- High court
- District and taluk level

1. Chairmen 2. Secretaries

- Mandal committees
- Mediation centres

Types of Lok Adalat:

- Permanent – provides a mechanism for adjudicating cases referred under public utility services, such as transport, postal, and telegraph
- National – held every month since 2015, on specific topic across the nation. These are held on a single day, disposing of a large number of pending cases.
- Mega Lok Adalat – held across all state courts in a single day
- Mobile – these are organised occasionally and travel from one place to another across the country, helping to resolve disputes.

== Lok Adalat committee and complaint procedures ==
The Lok Adalat settles disputes that can be mutually resolved and mostly relating to matrimonial, damages, and partition suits.

Requirements for cases to go before a Lok Adalat

- Civil cases, including marriage and family disputes, and compoundable criminal cases
- Cases pending in regular court under their jurisdiction
- Both parties in a dispute must agree to a settlement
- Initial court fee paid for complaint/petition is refunded to the parties, as no court fee is chargeable if a matter referred to the Lok Adalat is resolved.
- Procedural laws and the Evidence Act are not strictly followed while assessing claims.
- Decisions are binding on the parties.

Types of cases admitted in a Lok Adalat

1. Any of the following disputes or cases pending in any court of law in India:

- Compoundable criminal offences
- Cases under section 138 of the Negotiable Instruments Act
- Issues relating to recovery of money
- Issues under the Indian Motor Vehicles Act, 1988.
- Issues relating to labour disputes
- Issues relating to public utility bills like electricity, water, etc., excluding non-compoundable offences
- Issues relating to matrimony

2. Any dispute planned for filing in court that has not come up for hearing. The following pre-litigation cases can also be filed in a Lok-Adalat:

- Cases under section 138 of the Negotiable Instruments Act
- Cases relating to recovery of money
- Issues relating to labour disputes
- Issues relating to public utility bills like electricity, water, etc., excluding non-compoundable offences
- General maintenance-related disputes
- Other miscellaneous cases that are civil disputes, criminal compoundable cases, and matrimonial disputes

Any legal issue that is not compoundable as per India legal systems cannot be taken up in a Lok Adalat.

The main condition of a Lok Adalat is that both parties involved in a dispute agree to a settlement. If they are unable to do so, the case is referred to the Permanent Lok Adalat, provided it is not related to a compoundable offence.

== See also ==
- Gram Nyayalayas Act, 2008
- Legal Services Authorities Act 1987
