= Telangana Lok Adalat =

Dispute resolution mechanism in India

Telangana State Legal Services Authority

Agency overview
- Formed: 2014

Jurisdictional structure
- Federal agency: India
- Operations jurisdiction: India
- General nature: Federal law enforcement

Operational structure
- Headquarters: Telangana State Legal Services Authority, Hyderabad.
- Agency executive: Hon'ble Shri Justice SATISH CHANDRA SHARMA., Chief Justice, Telangana High Court and Chief Patron.

Website
- https://tslsa.telangana.gov.in/index.php

Telangana Lok Adalat, or Telangana State Legal Services Authority (People's Court), is a statutory and autonomous body formed under the Legal Services Authorities Act, 1987, as an alternative dispute resolution mechanism used in the state of Telangana, as per the Constitution of India. The legal body utilises the Indian legal mechanism of Lok Adalat, an alternative dispute redressal mechanism that enables cases pending in courts of law or in pre-litigation stages to be resolved amicably. It is recognised as a statutory authority under the Legal Services Authorities Act, 1987, and the Lok Adalat decisions made by the body are deemed to be final civil court judgements enforceable on both parties and not appealable in any court of law. However, by approaching the court of appropriate jurisdiction, litigation can be initiated by any party in the suit if they are dissatisfied with the decision of the Lok Adalat (in the absence of any provision for appeal against such an award).

"Section 22 B of The Legal Services Authorities Act, 1987, provides for the establishment of Permanent Lok Adalats (PLA) for exercising jurisdiction in respect of one or more public utility services (PUS). Section 22 A of The Legal Services Authorities Act, 1987, states what constitutes 'Public Utility Services' for Permanent Lok Adalats".

== History and Administration ==
Telangana Lok Adalat is designed to provide constitutional protection guaranteed under Article 14 and 39-A of the Constitution of India, of “ACCESS TO JUSTICE FOR ALL”. The provisions of Constitution had been drafted to help every citizen to get justice irrespective of their economic or other limitations. The primary value laid down as per Indian Constitutional philosophy is individual dignity which forms the basis of human rights and demands on a holistic basis of civil, political, economic, social, and cultural rights.

The Telangana Lok Adalat has been established with the objective of ensuring accessible, practical, and effective dispute resolution while upholding the principles of equality and impartiality enshrined in the Constitution of India. It assumes particular significance in addressing the needs of people affected by poverty, illiteracy, and limited access to the formal justice system.

Lok Adalats are constituted at below levels:

- State Authorities.
- High Court.
- District and Taluka level.

1. Chairman.

2. Secretaries.

- Mandal Committees.
- Mediation Centres.

Types of Lok Adalat:

- Permanent Lok Adalat - Provides mechanism for adjudging cases referred under public utility services like transport, postal and telegraph.
- National Lok Adalat - Held from year 2015, every month on specific topic across India. These are held on a single day disposing off large number of pending cases.
- Mega Lok Adalat - Held across all courts in state in a single day.
- Mobile Lok Adalats - These types of Lok Adalats are organised occasionally which travel from one place to other across country occasionally and help resolving disputes.

== Lok Adalat Committee and Complaint Procedures ==
Lok Adalat settles disputes which can be mutually resolved and mostly relate to matrimonial, damages and partition suits. The following are the requirements of the cases before Lok Adalat:

- Lok Adalat takes up cases which are civil in nature (including marriage, and family disputes) and compoundable criminal cases.
- It accepts cases pending in regular court under their jurisdiction.
- The main condition of the Lok Adalat is that both parties in dispute agree for settlement.
- The court fee paid initially in the court for the complaints/petition is refunded to the parties, as no court fee is chargeable if a matter referred in the Lok Adalat and is resolved with parties agreeing to bind by it.
- Procedural laws and the Evidence Act are not strictly followed while assessing claims.
- Decisions are binding on the parties and its order is capable of execution through legal process.

The following types of cases can be admitted in Lok Adalat.

1. Any dispute or case pending in any court of law in India.

- Criminal offences which are compoundable.
- Cases under section 138 of Negotiable Instruments Act.
- Issues relating to recovery of money.
- Issues under Indian Motor Vehicles Act,1988.
- Issues relating to labour disputes.
- Issues relating to public utility bills like electricity, water etc. excluding Non Compoundable offences.
- Issues relating to Matrimony.

2. Any dispute to be planned to filed in Court but did not come up for hearing in front of it. Following Pre-Litigation cases can also be filed in Lok-Adalat.

- Cases under section 138 of Negotiable Instruments Act.
- Cases relating to recovery of money.
- Issues relating to labour disputes.
- Issues relating to public utility bills like electricity, water etc. excluding Non Compoundable offences.
- General Maintenance related disputes.
- Other Miscellaneous cases which are civil disputes, criminal compoundable cases and matrimonial disputes.

However, any legal issue which is not compoundable as per the Indian legal system cannot be taken up in the Lok Adalat.

As the members are presiding Lok Adalat as statutory conciliators and not in judicial capacity they can only persuade the parties to come to a settlement. Sometimes counselling sessions are also held between opposing parties.

The main condition of the Lok Adalat is that both parties in dispute agree for settlement and if they are unable to do so, it is referred to the Permanent Lok Adalat for deciding the case provided the case is not related to compoundable offence.

Telangana Lok Adalat, as per a Supreme Court judgement, is formed to arrive at a compromise or solution between parties in dispute and hence does not have jurisdiction to go into the merits of a complaint.

== Details of cases Resolved ==
- In September 2021, Telangana Lok Adalat as part of holding National Lok Adalat across state settled cases relating to accident claims, marital issues and civil disputes which were pending for long time with the help of mediation and conciliation efforts of judges across state.
- In 2021, Telangana Lok Adalat, as part of Lok Adalat topics included an OTS (one-time settlement) benefit scheme under which concessions were offered to borrowers of banks to settle their dues with the banks in lump sum and avail concessions, helping banks recover substantial amounts and making the borrowers free of defaulter tag.
- In 2019, Telangana Lok Adalat, as part of National Lok Adalat, settled 8229 cases, which included 2,304 cases in pre-litigation stage, 5925 cases pending in various courts relating to various categories awarding a compensation of 34.63 crores to competing parties across state.
- In 2020, Telangana Lok Adalat, as part of National Lok Adalat, settled 32,304 cases relating to various issues across state.

== See also ==
- Gram Nyayalayas Act, 2008
- Legal Services Authorities Act 1987
