= National Legal Services Day =

Commemorative day in India

National Legal Services Day, on 9 November, commemorates the enactment of the Indian Legal Services Authorities Act 1987.

== History ==
In many countries, pro bono legal service initiatives, such as mediation and legal services, are typically haphazard, closing due to lack of demand or being overwhelmed with clients.

Alternate dispute resolution methods such as Lok Adalat, Mediation and free legal aid have been devised; however no special statutes have been enacted to streamline the process. On 11 October 1987, the Legal Services Authorities Act 1987 was enacted. The act took effect on 9 November 1995. India's National Legal Services Authority (NALSA) was constituted under its provisions on 5 December 1995. NALSA undertook activities including free legal aid and advice to the needy, disposal of cases through mediation and amicable settlement. It was a unique effort to minimize the pendency load (backlog) of Indian courts as well as to afford access to justice for needy litigants. To commemorate the occasion, the day of enactment was first celebrated in 1995 as National Legal Services Day. Each state's Legal Services Authorities organize the day through state, district level and Taluk level institutions.

== Celebration ==
Legal Service Day is celebrated to make people aware of the various provisions under the Legal Services Authorities Act and the rights of the litigants. Each jurisdiction organizes Lok Adalats, legal aid camps and legal aid programmes.
