= National Legal Services Authority =

Indian agency providing free legal services

National Legal Service Authority
- राष्ट्रीय विधिक सेवा प्राधिकरण; NALSA
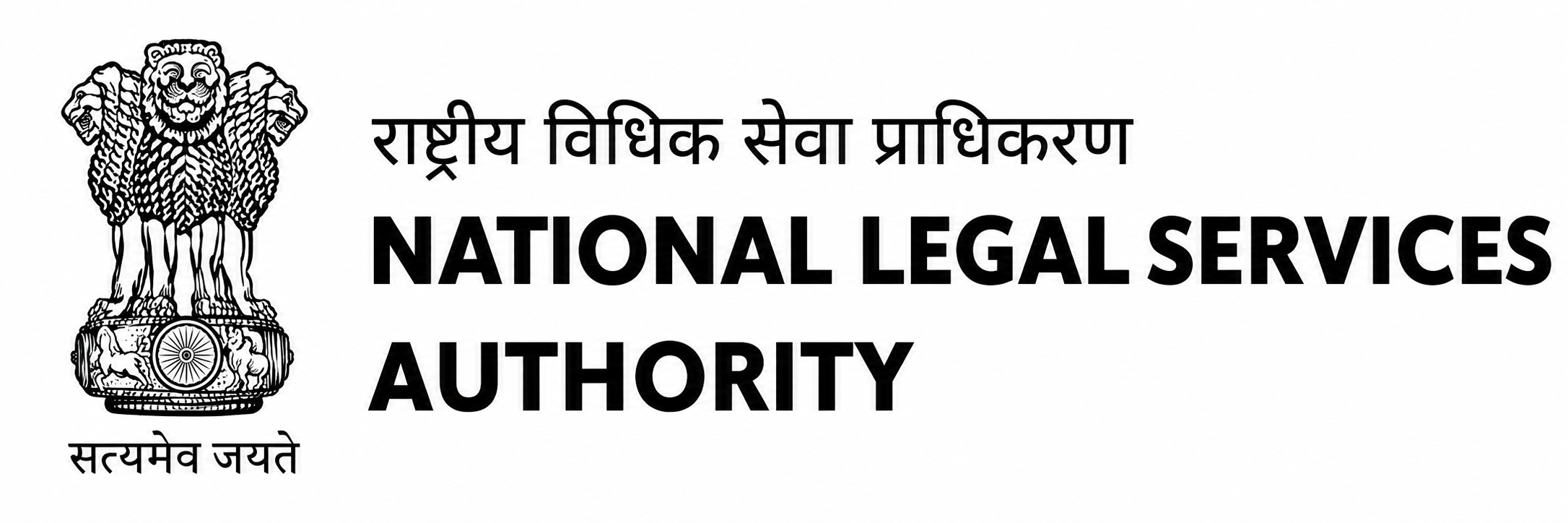
- Logo of NALSA

Judicial Body overview
- Formed: 9 November 1995; 30 years ago
- Headquarters: New Delhi
- Motto: Access to Justice for All (न्याय सब के लिए)
- Judicial Body executives: CJI Surya Kant, Patron-in-Chief; Justice Vikram Nath, Executive Chairman
- Key document: Legal Services Authorities Act 1987
- Website: nalsa.gov.in

The National Legal Services Authority (NALSA) is a statutory body of India established on 9 November 1995 under the Legal Services Authorities Act 1987. Its purpose is to provide free legal services to eligible candidates (defined in Section 12 of the Act), and to organize Lok Adalats for speedy resolution of cases. The prime objective of NALSA is speedy disposal of cases and reducing the burden of judiciary. There is a provision for establishing similar mechanisms at state and district level also headed by Chief Justice of High Courts and Chief Judges of District courts respectively.

The Chief Justice of India is patron-in-chief of NALSA while the second senior-most judge of the Supreme Court of India is the Executive-Chairman. The current Executive-Chairman of NALSA is Justice Vikram Nath.

== See also ==
- Legal awareness
