= Gram Nyayalayas Act, 2008 =

Law to provide for village courts in India

Parliament of India
- Long title: An Act to provide for the establishment of Gram Nyayalayas at the grass roots level for the purposes of providing access to justice to the citizens at their doorsteps and to ensure that opportunities for securing justice are not denied to any citizen by reason of social, economic or other disabilities and for matters connected therewith or incidental thereto.
- Citation: Act No. 4 of 2009
- Enacted by: Parliament of India
- Assented to: 7 January 2009
- Commenced: 2 October 2009
- Status: In force

The Gram Nyayalayas Act, 2008 is an Act of Parliament of India enacted for the establishment of Gram Nyayalayas or village courts for speedy and easy access to the justice system in the rural areas of India. The Act came into force on 2 October 2009. However, the Act has not been enforced properly, with only 208 functional Gram Nyayalayas in the country (as of 3 September 2019) against a target of 5000 such courts. The major reasons behind the non-enforcement include financial constraints, reluctance of lawyers, police and other government officials.

== Features ==
- Gram Nyayalaya are established generally at headquarter of every Panchayat at intermediate level or a group of contiguous panchayat in a district where there is no panchayat at intermediate level.
- The Gram Nyayalayas are presided over by a Nyayadhikari, who will have the same power, and enjoy the same salary and benefits of a Judicial Magistrate of First Class. Such Nyayadhikari are to be appointed by the State Government in consultation with the respective High Court.
- A Gram Nyayalaya has jurisdiction over an area specified by a notification by the State Government in consultation with the respective High Court. The Court can function as a mobile court at any place within the jurisdiction of such Gram Nyayalaya, after giving wide publicity to that regards.
- The Gram Nyayalayas have both civil and criminal jurisdiction over the offences and nature of suits specified in the First and Second schedules of the Act. The pecuniary jurisdiction of the Nyayalayas are fixed by the respective High Courts.
- The fees charged in civil suits shall not exceed Rs.100 irrespective of the value of property in dispute.
- Both the Central and the State Government can add or remove items in the Schedule. While the Central Government can amend the list in Schedule I and II, by notifying them and thereafter laying it in the Parliament, the State Government can amend the items in Part III of Schedule I or II, in the areas of law which the state is competent to enact law after due consultation with the respective High Court and notifying it. Such notification has to be laid in the State Legislature.
- Offences are to be tried in a summary manner in accordance with Chapter XXI of Code of Criminal Procedure.
- The Act allows plea bargaining in accordance with Chapter XXIA of Code of Criminal Procedure.
- Gram Nyayalayas can follow special procedures in civil matters, in a manner it deem just and reasonable in the interest of justice.
- Civil suits are proceeded on a day-to-day basis, with limited adjournments and are to be disposed of within a period of six months from the date of institution of the suit.
- In execution of a decree, the Court can allow special procedures following rules of natural justice.
- Gram Nyayalayas allow for conciliation of the dispute and settlement of the same in the first instance.
- Gram Nyayalayas has been given power to accept certain evidences which would otherwise not be acceptable under Indian Evidence Act.
- Appeals in criminal matter can be made to the Sessions Court in the respective jurisdiction and in civil matters to the District Court within a period of one month from the date of judgment.

== See also ==
- Lok Adalat
- Legal Services Authorities Act 1987
