= Legal Services Authorities Act, 1987 =

Act of the Parliament of India

The Legal Services Authorities Act, 1987 is an Act of the Indian Parliament to enforce the provisions of Article 39 A of the Constitution guaranteeing the fundamental rights to all the citizens of the country. Article 39 A of the constitution relates to promoting justice on the basis of equal opportunity by providing free legal aid to the sections of society like poor and economically weaker sections who cannot otherwise afford it. Among other things the act deals with pay and qualifications of staff. The Act resulted in creation of The National Legal Services Authority (NALSA) across country.

The act was enacted with effect from 9 November 1987. To commemorate the occasion, 9 November every year is celebrated National Legal Services Day in India.

== History ==
Legal Services Authorities Act 1987 was enacted by Parliament of India to provide legal support for free to the poor and ensuring that it promotes justice based on equal opportunity, thus getting in effect Article 39-A of constitution. To promote justice through free legal aid to the poorer, backward and weaker citizens of the country and help promoting justice in society, Constitution of India created Article 39-A. The Act became enforceable from 9 November 1995, facilitating establishment of countrywide network and provision for free and efficient legal services to the poor and weaker members. The National Legal Services Authority (NALSA) courts were created across country working as per the provisions of this Act.

Legal Services Authorities Act 1987 states that every judgement of Lok Adalats Every award made by a Lok Adalat shall be final and binding on all the parties to the dispute, and no appeal shall lie to any court against the award".

== Persons Entitled for Legal Aid ==
As per section 12 of Legal Services Authorities Act 1987, free legal aid is available to following categories of citizens:

-"A person from Scheduled Caste or Scheduled Tribe.

-A person under category of beggar as per Article 23 of the Constitution or a victim of human trafficking.

-Child or a woman.

-Woman who is victim of rape.

-Person with any disability or mentally ill.

-Individual being mass disaster victim, ethnic violence, atrocities due to caste, victims of flood, earthquake or industrial disaster or drought victims.

- Workman from industry.

-In custody, including custody in a protective home within the meaning of clause(g) of Section 2 of the Immoral Traffic (Prevention) Act, 1956(104 of 1956); or in a juvenile home within the meaning of clause(j) of Section 2 of the Juvenile Justice Act, 1986 (53 of 1986); or in a psychiatric hospital or psychiatric nursing home within the meaning of clause (g) of Section 2 of the Mental Health Act, 1987(14 of 1987);or

-In receipt of annual income less than rupees nine thousand or such other higher amount as may be prescribed by the state government, if the case is before a court other than the Supreme Court, and less than rupees twelve thousand or such other higher amount as may be prescribed by the central government, if the case is before the Supreme Court."

== Legal Service Types ==
Legal Services Authorities Act 1987 as per official website of NALSA, provides that the types of legal services which are available for free includes legal support in matters relating to civil and criminal offences for members from poor and marginalised sections who are unable to afford services of a lawyer for any legal proceeding or representation of any case before any court, tribunal or any legal authority.

Following types of services are covered in legal aid:

-Legal proceedings represented by advocate.

-Document preparation of any pleadings, appeal memo, or paper book which includes for translation and printing of documents towards legal proceeding;

- Expenses incurred for drafting special leave petitions or other legal documents.

- Any service given and amount charged relating to any legal case conducted or proceedings before any court or other Authority or tribunal which are of legal nature and;

- Advises of legal nature.

- In addition to above, payment of fees towards any aid or advice given to the beneficiaries for claiming benefits for the schemes and statues framed by any state government or central government, it can be included under free legal services.

== See also ==
* Fundamental Rights in India
