= Section 63 of the Bharatiya Nyaya Sanhita =

Provision defining rape under India's criminal code

Section 63 of the Bharatiya Nyaya Sanhita, 2023

Parliament of India
- Enacted by: Parliament of India
- Enacted: 20–21 December 2023
- Assented to: 25 December 2023
- Commenced: 1 July 2024
- Bill citation: Act No. 45 of 2023

Keywords
- Rape, sexual offences, consent, women's rights
- Status: In force

Section 63 of Bharatiya Nyaya Sanhita is the principle statutory provision that defines the offence of rape and the circumstances under which a sexual act is a punishable offence in India. It is a part of Chapter V (Offences Against Woman and Child) of the BNS, 2023, which replaced the colonial Indian Penal Code from July 2024. The section carry forward the definition of rape from Section 375 of IPC and raises the minimum age within marital exception (Exception 2) from 15 to 18 years.

The section defines all sorts of sexual penetration (including penile, oral or object-based penetration) committed against a woman without voluntary consent as rape. The section retains the two exceptions protecting medical practitioners performing surgical procedures and a man from sexual intercourse with his own wife. The latter has attracted sustained challenges and is currently pending litigation before the Supreme Court of India.

== Background ==
=== Indian Penal Code, 1860 ===
The law of rape was originally governed by Section 375 IPC, drafted by Lord Thomas Macaulay, and enacted during colonial times. In its original form, rape was defined narrowly as penile-vaginal intercourse and excepted intercourse with wife over 13 years of age. The section underwent significant amendment following the Nirbhaya Case. The incident triggered protests and called for legislative response.

Criminal Law (Amendment) Act, 2013, also referred to as Nirbhaya Act, was passed on March 2013 and received assent on April 2013. The amendment widened the provision to encompass oral sex, penetration of objects or other body parts than penis. It also stated the principle that absence of physical resistance cannot be considered as consent. The age of marital exception was raised from 13 to 15.

=== Bharatiya Nyaya Sanhita, 2023 ===
The Bharatiya Nyaya Sanhita, 2023 was introduced in Lok Sabha on 11 August 2023 by Ministry of Home Affairs. The original bill was withdrawn and a revised version was passed on Lok Sabha and Rajya Sabha on December 2023 and received presidential ascent on 25 December 2023. It came into force from 1 July 2024.

Section 63 is largely restatement of Section 375 of IPC as amended in 2013. The principal change is the elevation of marital exception from 15 to 18 aligning to Supreme Court’s ruling in Independent Thought v. Union of India.

=== Statutory structure ===
Section 63 of BNS provides that a man is said to commit rape if he:

(a) penetrates his penis, to any extent, into the vagina, mouth, urethra or anus of a woman or makes her do so with him or any other person; or
(b) inserts, to any extent, any object or a part of the body, not being the penis, into the vagina, urethra or anus of a woman or makes her do so with him or any other person; or
(c) manipulates any part of the body of a woman so as to cause penetration into the vagina, urethra, anus or any part of the body; or
(d) applies his mouth to the vagina, anus or urethra of a woman or makes her do so with him or any other person,

under the circumstances falling under any of the following seven descriptions:

(i) Against her will.
(ii) Without her consent.
(iii) With her consent, when her consent has been obtained by putting her or any person in whom she is interested in fear of death or of hurt.
(iv) With her consent, when the man knows that he is not her husband and that her consent is given because she mistakenly believes that he is another man to whom she is, or believes herself to be, lawfully married.
(v) With her consent when, by reason of unsoundness of mind or intoxication or the administration of any stupefying or unwholesome substance, she is unable to understand the nature and consequences of that to which she gives consent.
(vi) With or without her consent, when she is under eighteen years of age.
(vii) When she is unable to communicate consent.

The section contains two explanations and two exceptions:

Explanation 1 — A woman who does not physically resist the act of penetration shall not by reason only of that fact be regarded as consenting to the sexual activity.
Explanation 2 — Consent means an unequivocal voluntary agreement when the woman, by words, gestures or any form of verbal or non-verbal communication, communicates willingness to participate in the specific sexual act.

Exception 1 — A medical procedure or intervention shall not constitute rape.
Exception 2 — Sexual intercourse or sexual acts by a man with his own wife, the wife not being under eighteen years of age, is not rape.

=== Essential elements ===
To establish that a rape has been committed, the court must be satisfied of three broad requirements. First, the actus reus, any of the four forms of penetration from (a) to (d) must have occurred. Second, one of the seven circumstances from (i) to (vii) must be present. Third, the accused must have known or had reason to know the absence of valid consent; holding that consent cannot be presumed from passive submission or silence.

== Controversies ==
=== Exception 2 ===
Exception 2, which excepts intercourse by a man with his own wife, the wife not being under the age of 18 from rape has been one of the most contested provision within the BNS. The exception was articulated by 17th-century English jurist Mathhew Hale, which held that a wife irrevocably consents to intercourse with her husband upon marriage. This has been abolished in England and Wales and criminalized in over 150 jurisdictions.

A batch of petition challenging the constitutional validity of Exception 2 has been pending before the Supreme Court. The Delhi High Court issued a split verdict in May 2022 as Justice Rajiv Shakdher held the exception to be unconstitutional and Justice C. Hari Shankar held that the matter was not for judicial determination. The matter was appealed to the Supreme Court, where hearings before a bench headed by then Chief Justice D. Y. Chandrachud commenced in January 2024. The Union Government submitted a 49-page affidavit opposing the removal in October 2024, arguing that criminalization would be excessively harsh and could destabilize the institution of marriage and the matter fell in the domain of Parliament’s legislature. After the retirement of Chandrachud, the hearing were deferred and is currently pending before SC with no scheduled verdict.

Critics of the exception including Justice Verma Committee (formed after Nirbhaya Case) have argued that marriage cannot be treated as irrevocable consent to sexual acts and that the exception contradicts the definition of consent in the section. Supporters have argued that exisiting provisions of Protection of Women from Domestic Violence Act, 2005 and Section 85 of BNS addresses the issue.

=== Gender neutrality ===
Section 63 is entirely gendered; only a man can commit a rape and only against a woman. The BNS has been criticized for failing to introduce a gender-neutral definition, particularly after the decriminalization of homosexual act. The International Bar Association noted that placing sexual offences in such a manner removes protection from non-minor males against penetrative assault.

== See also ==
- Bharatiya Nyaya Sanhita, 2023
- Indian Penal Code
- Criminal Law (Amendment) Act, 2013
- 2012 Delhi gang rape case
- Marital rape in India
- Bharatiya Sakshya Adhiniyam, 2023
- Protection of Women from Domestic Violence Act, 2005
