= Code of Criminal Procedure, 1973 =

Erstwhile Code of Criminal Law of India

Parliament of India
- Long title: An Act to consolidate and amend the law relating to Criminal Procedure.
- Citation: Act No. 2 of 1974
- Territorial extent: India
- Assented to by: President
- Assented to: 25 January 1974
- Commenced: 1 April 1974
- Repealed: 1 July 2024
- Committee report: 41st Report of the Law Commission of India (1969); 37th Report of the Law Commission of India (1967); 14th Report of the Law Commission of India (1958); Joint Committee on the Code of Criminal Procedure Bill, 1970; Report of the Expert Committee on Legal Aid- Processual Justice to the People (1973)

Repeals
- Code of Criminal Procedure, 1898

Amended by
- see Amendments

Repealed by
- Bharatiya Nagarik Suraksha Sanhita

Related legislation
- Indian Penal Code, 1860; Juvenile Justice Act, 2000; Police Act, 1861; Indian Evidence Act, 1872

Summary
- Procedure for administration of substantive criminal laws.
- Status: Repealed

The Code of Criminal Procedure, 1973, commonly called Criminal Procedure Code (CrPC), was the main legislation on procedure for administration of substantive criminal law in India. It was enacted in 1973 and came into force on 1 April 1974. It provides the machinery for the investigation of crime, apprehension of suspected criminals, collection of evidence, determination of guilt or innocence of the accused person and the determination of punishment of the guilty. It also deals with public nuisance, prevention of offences and maintenance of wife, child and parents.

On 11 August 2023, a Bill to replace the CrPC with the Bharatiya Nagarik Suraksha Sanhita (BNSS) was introduced in the Lok Sabha. On 26 December 2023, it was replaced with Bharatiya Nagarik Suraksha Sanhita (BNSS).

== History ==
In medieval India, subsequent to the law set by the Muslims, the Mohammedan Criminal Law came into prevalence. The British rulers passed the Regulating Act 1773 under which a Supreme Court was established in Calcutta and later on at Madras and in Bombay. The Supreme Court was to apply British procedural law while deciding the cases of the Crown's subjects.

After the Rebellion of 1857, the crown took over the administration in India. The Indian Penal Code was passed by the Imperial Legislative Council in 1860. The CrPC was created for the first time ever in 1882 and then amended in 1898, then according to the 41st Law Commission report in 1973.

== Classification of offences under the Code ==
=== Cognizable and non-cognizable offences ===
Cognizable offences are those offences for which a police officer may arrest without a court-mandated warrant in accordance with the first schedule of the code. For non-cognizable cases the police officer may arrest only after being duly authorized by a warrant. Non-cognizable offences are, generally, relatively less serious offences than cognizable ones. Cognizable offences reported under section 154 CrPC while non-cognizable offences reported under section 155 CrPC. For non-cognizable offences the Magistrate empowered to take cognizance under section 190 CrPC. Under section 156(3) CrPC the Magistrate is competent to direct the police to register the case, investigate the same and submit the challan/report for cancellation. (2003 P.Cr.L.J.1282)

Ingredients of Section 154

1. It is an information which is given to police officer.
2. Information must relate to a cognizable offence.
3. It is an information of offence first in point of time.
4. The investigation starts immediately after recording the FIR.
5. The information may be given by orally or in writing (A telephonic information is not sufficient to become FIR has been held in the case of Surajit Sarkar vs State of West Bengal 2012 SC).
6. A copy of the FIR shall be given to the informant free of cost immediately.

=== Summons-case and warrant-case ===
Under Section 204 of the code, a Magistrate taking cognizance of an offence is to issue summons for the attendance of the accused if the case is a summons case. If the case appears to be a warrant case, he may issue a warrant or summons, as he sees fit. Section 2(w) of the Code defines summons-case as, a case relating to an offence, and not being a warrant-case. Section 2(x) of the Code defines warrant-case as, a case relating to an offence punishable with death, imprisonment for life or imprisonment for a term exceeding two years.

== Territorial extent, scope and applicability ==
The Criminal Procedure Code is applicable in the whole of India. The Parliament's power to legislate in respect of Jammu & Kashmir was curtailed by Article 370 of the Constitution of India. Though, as of 2019, the Parliament has revoked Article 370 from Jammu and Kashmir, thus rendering the CrPC applicable to the whole of India.

Provided that the provisions of this Code, other than those relating to Chapters (VIII), (X) and (XI) thereof, shall not apply-

(a) to the State of Nagaland, (b) to the tribal areas,

However the concerned State Government may, by notification apply any or all of these provisions in these areas. Moreover, the Supreme Court of India has also ruled that even in these areas, the authorities are to be governed by the substance of these rules

== Bodies function under the code ==
1. Supreme Court of India
2. High Courts
3. District and Session Judge and Additional District Judges
4. Judicial Magistrates (CJM, JFCM, JSCM)
5. Executive Magistrates (DM, ADM, SDM, EM)
6. Police
7. Public prosecutors
8. Defence counsels
9. Correctional Services Personnel

== Sentences which magistrates may pass ==
- The Court of a Chief Judicial Magistrate may pass any sentence authorised by law except a sentence of death or of imprisonment for life or of imprisonment for a term exceeding seven years.
- The Courts of Judicial Magistrate of First Class may pass a sentence of imprisonment for a term not exceeding three years, or of fine not exceeding ten thousand rupees (sub by act 25 of 2005 for rupees five thousand), or of both.
- The Courts of Judicial Magistrate of Second Class may pass a sentence of imprisonment for a term not exceeding one year, or of fine not exceeding five thousand rupees(sub by act 25 of 2005 for rupees one thousand), or of both.
- The Court of a Chief Metropolitan Magistrate shall have the powers of the Court of a Chief Judicial Magistrate and the court of a Metropolitan Magistrate, shall have the powers of the Courts of Judicial Magistrate of First Class

== Bail ==
There is no definition of the term "bail" under the code though the terms "bailable" and "non-bailable" have been defined. It has however been defined by the Black's Law Lexicon as security for the appearance of the accused person on giving which he is released pending trial or investigation

The First Schedule to the Code, classifies the offences defined in the Indian Penal Code. Besides specifying whether an offence is Bailable or Non-Bailable it also specifies if it is Cognizable or Non-Cognizable, which Court has the jurisdiction to try the said offence, the minimum and maximum amount of punishment that can or shall be awarded for the said offence.

The Supreme Court of India can and has from time to time made certain bailable offences, non-bailable or vice-a-versa by special directions, to curb increasing menace of certain crimes in the society. The State Government has the power to make certain offences bailable or non-bailable in their respective States.

== Summary trials ==
Section 260 Clause 1 of the Code lists certain offences which may be summarily trialed by any Chief Judicial Magistrate, any Metropolitan Magistrate or any Judicial Magistrate First Class. A First Class Magistrate must first be authorised by the respective High Court to that effect before he may try cases summarily under this Section.

The offences that may be tried summarily under this Section are:

1. Offences not punishable with death, life imprisonment, or imprisonment for a term exceeding two years.
2. Theft under Section 379, 380 and 381 of the Indian Penal Code provided that the value of the stolen property is below ₹ 2,000.
3. Receiving or retaining stolen property under Section 411 of the penal code where the value of the stolen property is below ₹ 2,000.
4. Assisting in the concealment or disposal of stolen property, under Section 414 of the penal code, the value of the stolen property being below ₹ 2,000.
5. Lurking house-trespass (Section 454 of the Indian Penal Code) and house-breaking (Section 456 of the Penal Code) at night.
6. Insult with an intent to provoke a breach of peace under Section 504 and criminal intimidation under Section 506 of the penal code.
7. Abetting of any of the above-mentioned offences.
8. Attempt to commit any of the above-mentioned offences.
9. Offences with respect to which complaints may be made under Section 20 of Cattle Trespass Act, 1871.

Apart from the above, a Second Class Magistrate may, if so empowered by the High Court, summarily try an offence punishable with fine or with imprisonment not exceeding six months or the abetment or attempt to commit such an offence. As per section 262(2) no sentence of imprisonment for a term exceeding three months shall be passed in the case of any conviction under this chapter 21.

A summary trial tried by a magistrate without being empowered to do so is void. The procedure for a summons case is to be followed, subject to special provisions made in this behalf. The maximum sentence that may be awarded by way of a summary trial is three months with or without fine.

The Magistrate may give up the summary trial in favour of the regular trial if he finds it undesirable to try the case summarily. The judgement is to be delivered in abridged form.

== Judgment ==
Judgment is the final reasoned decision of the Court as to the guilt or innocence of the accused. Where the accused is found guilty, the judgment must also contain an order requiring the accused to undergo punishment or treatment.

Every court must deliver the judgement in the language of that court as determined by the State Government. It must contain the points that lead to the determination of guilt or innocence. It usually commences with facts and must indicate careful analysis of evidence. It must also specify the offence under the penal code or such other specific law as well as the punishment sentenced. If acquitted the offence of which the accused is so acquitted must be specified along with a direction that the accused be set at liberty.

=== Judgments in abridged form ===
According to Section 355 of the Code, a Metropolitan Magistrate may deliver judgments in abridged form and should contain:

1. Date of commission of the offence
2. Name of the complainant (if any)
3. Name of the accused person, his parentage and residence
4. Offence complained of (or proved, as the case may be)
5. Plea of the accused and his examination (if any)
6. Final order
7. Date of the order
8. In cases where appeal lies from the final order, a brief statement of reasons for the decision.

=== Compensation and costs ===
The functions of a civil court may be performed by a criminal court by virtue of Section 357, 358 and 359. This has been done to provide just, speedy and less expensive redress to the victim. The court is empowered to levy a fine from the offender. Such fine may, wholly or in part, be used for the purpose of compensating the victim as per the amendment of 2009. A new section 357A has been inserted which talks of victim compensation scheme. Further in the year 2013 two new sections namely section 357B and section 357C were inserted to make compensation to the victim (as defined under section 2(wa))in addition to fine imposed under section 364A or 376D of the IPC as well as treatment of victim respectively.

=== Post-conviction orders ===
Having regards to the age, character and antecedents of the offender, and the circumstances in which the offence was committed, if the Court convicting the accused considers it expedient to release the offender, it may do so either on probation of good conduct or after due admonishment. This provision is contained in Section 360 of the Code.

Thus the court may direct that the offender be released on his entering into a bond, with or without sureties. The offender is further required to keep peace and be of good behaviour as well as appear thereafter before the court when called upon during such period as the court may decide. This period should not exceed three years. The following conditions have to be satisfied:

- There is no previous conviction proved against the offender.
- In case the person convicted is a woman of any age, or a man aged below twenty-one years, the offence committed is not punishable with life imprisonment or death penalty.
- In case the person is a man above twenty-one years of age, the offence of which he is convicted is punishable with fine.

Alternatively, the offender may be released after due admonition, if the following conditions are satisfied:

- There is no previous conviction proved against the offender.
- The offence of which the accused is convicted is any of the following:
1. Theft,
2. Theft in a building,
3. Dishonest misappropriation,
4. Any offence punishable under the Indian Penal Code with no more than two years of imprisonment,
5. Any offence punishable only by fine.

No Magistrate of Second Class may release an offender under in such manner without being empowered to do so. He may transfer the case to a Magistrate for consideration.

Section 361 narrows down the discretion of the Court to sentence an offender without taking into consideration the provisions of Section 360 and similar provisions contained in the Probation of Offenders Act or any other law for treatment, training and rehabilitation of youthful offenders. It requires that when such provisions are applicable, the Court must record in writing, the reason for not allowing the benefit of the same to the offender.

Section 30 provides the Court of a Magistrate with the power to award imprisonment for additional terms over the substantive period awarded.

== Appeal ==
The Code and the Constitution of India together provide for multiple ranges of appellate remedy. A person convicted by the High Court exercising original criminal jurisdiction may appeal before Supreme Court. Where the High Court has, on appeal reversed an order of acquittal and sentenced him to death and imprisonment for a term of ten years or more, the accused may appeal to the Supreme Court. The Constitution provides that an appeal shall lie to the Supreme Court against the direction of Supreme Court if the High Court certifies that the case involves substantial questions of law as to the interpretation of the Constitution.

Judgements and orders arising from petty cases are not appealable unless the sentences are combined with other sentences. There can not be an appeal when the accused pleads guilty and is convicted on such plea by the High Court. If the conviction from a plea of guilt is by a Sessions Court, Metropolitan Magistrate or a Magistrate of First or Second Class, only the legality of the sentence may be brought into question in an appeal.

== Amendments ==
The Code has been amended several times.

S. No.	Short title of amending legislation	No.	Year
1	The Repealing and Amending Act, 1974	56	1974
2	The Code of Criminal Procedure (Amendment) Act, 1978	45	1978
3	The Code of Criminal Procedure (Amendment) Act, 1980	63	1980
4	The Criminal Law (Amendment) Act, 1983	43	1983
5	The Criminal Law (Second Amendment) Act, 1983	46	1983
6	The Code of Criminal Procedure (Amendment) Act, 1988	32	1988
7	The Code of Criminal Procedure (Amendment) Act, 1990	10	1990
8	The Code of Criminal Procedure (Amendment) Act, 1991	43	1991
9	The Code of Criminal Procedure (Amendment) Act, 1993	40	1993
10	The Criminal Law (Amendment) Act, 1993	42	1993
11	The Code of Criminal Procedure (Amendment) Act, 2001	50	2001
12	The Code of Criminal Procedure (Amendment) Act, 2005	25	2005
13	The Criminal Law (Amendment) Act, 2005	2	2006
14	The Code of Criminal Procedure (Amendment) Amending Act, 2006	25	2006
15	The Code of Criminal Procedure (Amendment) Act, 2008	5	2009
16	The Code of Criminal Procedure (Amendment) Act, 2010	41	2010
17	The Criminal Law (Amendment) Act, 2013	13	2013
18	The Lokpal and Lokayuktas Act, 2013	1	2014

== Sections ==
Section 41 of the Code of Criminal Procedure, 1973 provides a 9-point checklist which must be used to decide the need for an arrest. In 2014, Arnesh Kumar Guidelines were formulated by the Supreme Court stating arrests should be an exception, in cases where the punishment is less than seven years of imprisonment.

== See also ==
- Courts
- Crime
- Criminal law
- Substantive law
- Judiciary of India
- Indian Penal Code
- Criminal procedure
- Indian Evidence Act
- Government of India
- Law enforcement in India
- Civil Procedure Code, 1908
- Pendency of court cases in India
- Administrative divisions of India
- Category:Sections of the Indian Penal Code
