= Codes of Criminal Procedure - Amendments =

Indian Legal system has been on that has gone through a lot of changes through time. This is due to political as well as social situation and standing of the country. Code of Criminal Procedure, 1973, in its basic form, is the main legislation on procedure for administration of criminal law in India. It describes the procedure for the machinery for the investigation of crime, apprehension of suspected criminals, collection of evidence, determination of guilt or innocence of the accused person and the determination of punishment of the guilty.

Code of Criminal Law – Amendments may be a generic name either for legislation bearing that short title or for all legislation which amends the Code of Criminal Law.

== List of Amendments ==
1. Code of Criminal Procedure (Amendment) Act, 1978 (45 of 1978)
2. Code of Criminal Procedure (Amendment) Act, 1980 (63 of 1980)
3. Criminal Law (Amendment) Act, 1983 (43 of 1983)
4. Criminal Law (Second Amendment) Act, 1983 (46 of 1983)
5. Code of Criminal Procedure (Amendment) Act, 1988 (32 of 1988)
6. Code of Criminal Procedure (Amendment) Act, 1990 (10 of 1990)
7. Code of Criminal Procedure (Amendment) Act, 1991 (43 of 1991)
8. Code of Criminal Procedure (Amendment) Act, 1993 (40 of 101,3)
9. Criminal Law (Amendment) Act, 1993 (42 of 1993)
10. Code of Criminal Procedure (Amendment) Act, 2001 (50 of 2001)
11. Code of Criminal Procedure (Amendment) Act, 2005 (25 of 2005)
12. Criminal Law (Amendment) Act, 2005 (2 of 2006)
13. Code of Criminal Procedure (Amendment) Amending Act, 2006 (25 of 2006)
14. Code of Criminal Procedure (Amendment) Act, 2008 (5 of 2009)
15. Code of Criminal Procedure (Amendment) Act, 2010 (41 of 2010)
16. Code of Criminal Law (Amendment) Act, 2013
17. Code of Criminal Law (Amendment) Act, 2018

== See also ==
- Code of Criminal Procedure, 1973
