= Rape in India =

Sexual violence in India

Rape is the fourth most common crime against women in India. According to the 2021 annual report of the National Crime Records Bureau (NCRB), 31,677 rape cases were registered across the country, or an average of 86 cases daily, a rise from 2020 with 28,046 cases, while in 2019, 32,033 cases were registered. Of the total 31,677 rape cases, 28,147 (nearly 89%) of the rapes were committed by persons known to the victim. The share of victims who were minors or below 18, the legal age of consent, stood at 10%. According to Delhi Police data from 2019 to 2020, 44% of rape victims identified the accused as a relative or family member.

The government also classifies consensual sex committed on the false promise of marriage as rape. Most rapes go unreported in India, although the willingness to report rapes may have increased in recent years, after several incidents received widespread media attention and triggered local and nationwide public protests. This led the government to reform its penal code for crimes of rape and sexual assault.

According to NCRB 2021 statistics, Rajasthan reported the highest number of rapes among Indian states, followed by Madhya Pradesh and Uttar Pradesh. Among metropolitan cities, the national capital of Delhi continued to have the highest incidence of rape at 1,226 cases in 2021, while Jaipur had the highest rape rate (34 per 100,000 population). Kolkata had the least number of registered rape cases among metropolitan cities, with the lowest rape rate.

== Definition in Indian Penal Code ==
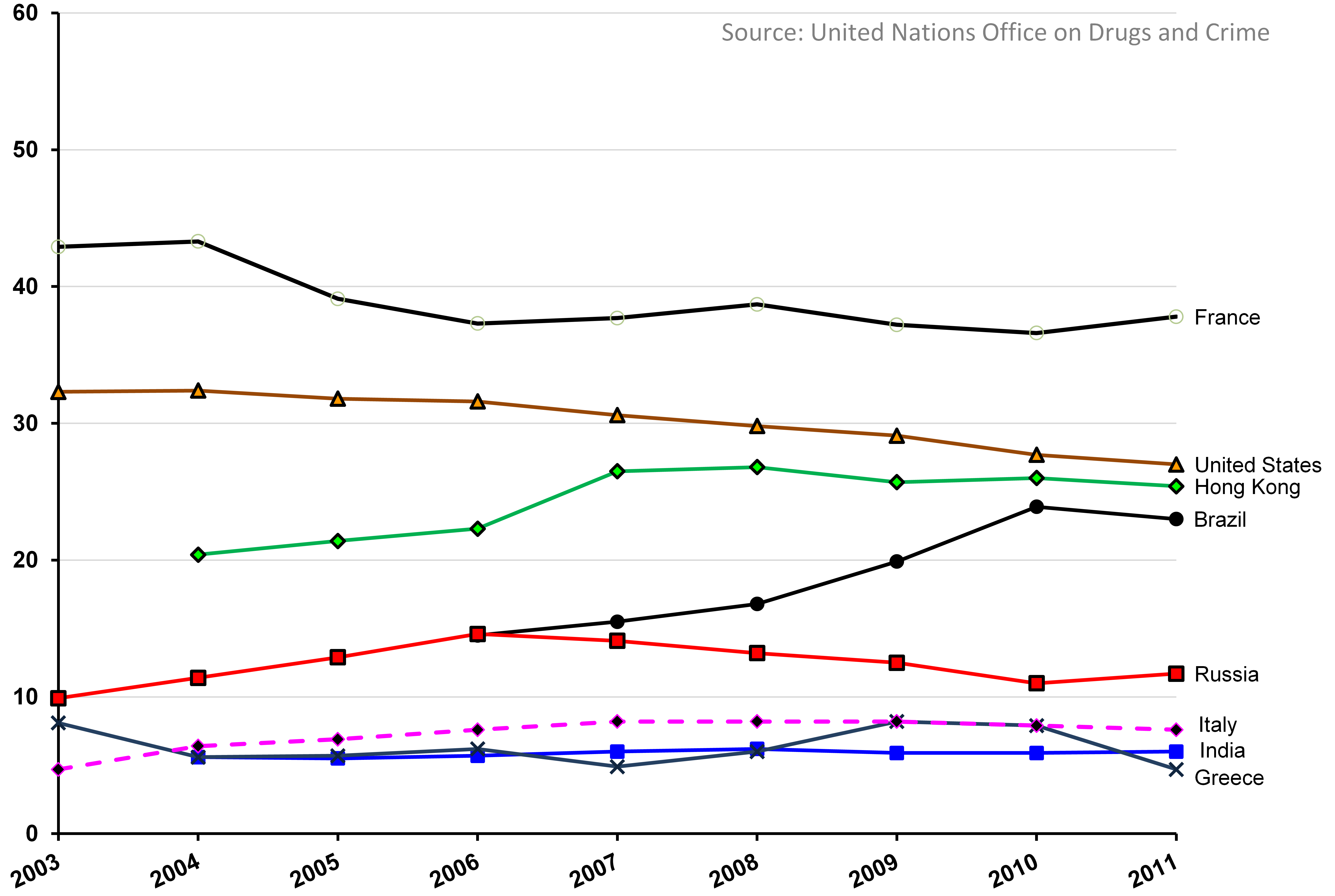
Annual rape and all forms of sexual assaults per 100,000 people, for India compared to select nations

Before 3 February 2013, Section 375 of the Indian Penal Code defined rape as:

§375. Rape. A man is said to commit "rape" who, except case hereinafter excepted, has sexual intercourse with a woman in circumstances falling under any of the six following descriptions:––

Firstly. –– Against her will.

Secondly. –– Without her consent.

Thirdly. –– With her consent, when her consent has been obtained by putting her or any person in whom she is interested, in fear of death or of hurt.

Fourthly. –– With her consent, when the man knows that he is not her husband, and that her consent is given because she believes that he is another man to whom she is or believes herself to be lawfully married.

Fifthly. –– With her consent, when, at the time of giving such consent, by reason of unsoundness of mind or intoxication or the administration by him personally or through another of any stupefying or unwholesome substance, she is unable to understand the nature and consequences of that to which she gives consent.

Sixthly. –– With or without her consent, when she is under sixteen years of age.

Explanation. –– Penetration is sufficient to constitute the sexual intercourse necessary to the offence of rape.

Exception. –– Sexual intercourse by a man with his own wife, the wife not being under fifteen years of age, (Note: The legal age of marriage in India is 18 years for females, as stipulated by the Hindu Marriage Act, the Indian Christian Marriage Act, and the Special Marriage Act. However, under Muslim personal law, which remains uncodified and unconsolidated, individuals are eligible to marry upon attaining puberty, generally interpreted as 15 years of age.) is not rape.

The above definition excluded marital rape, same sex crimes and considered all sex with a minor below the age of sixteen as rape.

After 3 February 2013, the definition was revised through the Criminal Law (Amendment) Act 2013, which also raised the legal age of minors to eighteen.

§375. A man is said to commit "rape" if he:–– (a) penetrates his penis, to any extent, into the vagina, mouth, urethra or anus of a woman or makes her to do so with him or any other person; or (b) inserts, to any extent, any object or a part of the body, not being the penis, into the vagina, the urethra or anus of a woman or makes her to do so with him or any other person; or (c) manipulates any part of the body of a woman so as to cause penetration into the vagina, urethra, anus or any part of body of such woman or makes her to do so with him or any other person; or (d) applies his mouth to the vagina, anus, urethra of a woman or makes her to do so with him or any other person, under the circumstances falling under any of the following seven descriptions:

Firstly. –– Against her will.

Secondly. –– Without her consent.

Thirdly. –– With her consent, when her consent has been obtained by putting her or any person in whom she is interested, in fear of death or of hurt.

Fourthly. –– With her consent, when the man knows that he is not her husband and that her consent is given because she believes that he is another man to whom she is or believes herself to be lawfully married.

Fifthly. –– With her consent when, at the time of giving such consent, by reason of unsoundness of mind or intoxication or the administration by him personally or through another of any stupefying or unwholesome Substance, she is unable to understand the nature and consequences of that to which she gives consent.

Sixthly. –– With or without her consent, when she is under eighteen years of age.

Seventhly. –– When she is unable to communicate consent.

Explanation 1. –– For the purposes of this section, "vagina" shall also include labia majora.

Explanation 2. –– Consent means an unequivocal voluntary agreement when the woman by words, gestures or any form of verbal or non-verbal communication, communicates willingness to participate in the specific sexual act;

Provided that a woman who does not physically resist to the act of penetration shall not by the reason only of that fact, be regarded as consenting to the sexual activity. Exceptions –– 1. A medical procedure or intervention shall not constitute rape; 2. Sexual intercourse or sexual acts by a man with his own wife, the wife not being under fifteen years of age, is not rape.

After the 2013 reform, marital rape within a cohabiting marriage continued to be exempt from criminal liability in India. Article 376B of the 2013 law made forced sexual intercourse by a man with his wife – if she is living separately – a crime, whether under a decree of separation or otherwise, punishable with at least a two-year prison term. Forced sex by a man with his wife may also be considered a prosecutable domestic violence under other sections of Indian Penal Code, such as Section 498(A) as well as the Protection of Women from Domestic Violence Act 2005. The crime of sexual assault on a child, that is anyone below the age of eighteen, is further outlined and mandatory punishments described in The Protection of Children from Sexual Offences Act 2012.

As CNN reported in 2020, a man convicted of raping a woman faces a minimum 10-year prison sentence. This may increase to a life sentence or even a death sentence depending on the circumstances and details of the crime. If the victim is transgender, however, the rapist is punished by a maximum of two years in prison, as defined by the Transgender Persons (Protection of Rights) Act 2019.

All sexual acts between the members of the same sex, consensual or forced, were previously a crime under Section 377 of the Indian penal code, after the 2013 Criminal Law reform, with punishment the same as that of rape but it was later overturned in a landmark judgement of the Supreme Court on 6 September 2018 which stated all consensual sexual acts between adults who have met the age of consent are not violative of Section 377, hence decriminalising gay sex in India.

Like Indian Penal Code, the Bharatiya Nyaya Sanhita retains the marital rape exception. It retains the value laden phrase ‘outraging the modesty of women’ instead of replacing it with the gender-neutral term ‘sexual assault’. It provides inadequate protection to victims of non-consensual intimate imagery. It does not include any provision for offences involving rape of males or of transgender individuals.

== Rape statistics ==
Reported rape rates per 100,000 population, 2015

India has one of the lowest per capita rape rates in the world. One rape was reported every 16 minutes in India in 2019. This figure was 15 minutes in 2018. In 2019, the national average rape rate (per 100,000 population) was 4.9, slightly less than 5.2 in 2018 and 2017. However, the small dip may be attributed to data for West Bengal not being available. As of 2019, Nagaland (0.8), Tamil Nadu (1.0), and Bihar (1.3) had the lowest rape rates among the states of India, while Rajasthan (15.9) had the highest rape rate. These statistics do not take into account rapes ending in murder and attempts to rape, which are counted separately by police in India.

Registered rape cases (victim/complainant reached police station) in 2019
State/UT	Total rape cases registered(2019)	Adult (18 yrs & above)	Minor (below 18 yrs)	2019 Rape rate(%)(per 100,000 pop.)	Annual change in Rape rate (2018–19)	Annual change in absolute no. of rape cases registered (2018–19)
India	32033	27093	4940	4.9	-0.3	-1323
Andhra Pradesh	1086	542	544	4.2	0.5	115
Arunachal Pradesh	63	39	24	8.6	-0.7	-4
Assam	1773	1685	88	10.5	0.6	125
Bihar	730	729	1	1.3	0.2	79
Chhattisgarh	1036	1033	3	7.2	-7.5	-1055
Goa	72	23	49	9.4	1.4	11
Gujarat	528	528	0	1.6	-0.1	-25
Haryana	1480	1472	8	10.9	1.2	184
Himachal Pradesh	359	162	197	10	0.4	15
Jammu and Kashmir	223	212	11	3.5	-1.5	-97
Jharkhand	1416	1228	188	7.7	1.7	326
Karnataka	505	505	0	1.6	0.1	13
Kerala	2023	761	1262	11.1	0.4	78
Madhya Pradesh	2485	2485	0	6.2	-7.6	-2948
Maharashtra	2299	2299	0	3.9	0.2	157
Manipur	36	26	10	2.3	-1.1	-16
Meghalaya	102	82	20	6.3	0.8	15
Mizoram	42	19	23	7.1	-1.4	-8
Nagaland	8	6	2	0.8	-0.2	-2
Odisha	1382	1151	231	6.2	.1	464
Punjab	1002	576	426	7.1	1.2	171
Rajasthan	5997	4684	1313	15.9	4.2	1662
Sikkim	11	11	0	3.5	-1.6	-5
Tamil Nadu	362	353	9	1	0.1	31
Telangana	606	606	0	4.7	1.4	267
Tripura	88	88	0	4.5	-0.5	-9
Uttar Pradesh	3065	2895	270	2.8	-0.9	-881
Uttarakhand	526	342	184	9.6	-0.8	-35
West Bengal	1069	1065	4	2.3	0	0
Andaman and Nicobar Islands	13	5	8	7	-9.1	-17
Chandigarh	112	47	65	20.7	4.6	26
Dadra and Nagar Haveli	0	0	0	0	-3.2	-7
Daman and Diu	4	4	0	3.1	0.7	1
Delhi	1253	1253	0	13.5	0.2	38
Lakshadweep	0	0	0	0	-6.1	-2
Puducherry	10	10	0	1.3	1.3	10

- Due to non-receipt of data from West Bengal in time for 2019, data furnished for 2018 has been used

Sources :

=== Rape of minors ===
Using a small sample survey, Human Rights Watch projected that more than 7,200 minors – 1.6 in 100,000 minors – are raped each year in India. Among these, victims who report the assaults are alleged to suffer mistreatment and humiliation from the police. Minor girls are trafficked into prostitution in India, thus rape of minors conflates into a lifetime of suffering. Of the countries studied by Maplecroft on sex trafficking and crime against minors, India was ranked 7th worst.

Incidence of forced marriage and kidnapping of minors (girls) in 2019
State/UT	Kidnapping & Abduction of Women to compel her for marriage (Section. 366 IPC)	Procuration of Minor Girls (Section 366A IPC)
India	15615	3117
Andhra Pradesh	65	48
Arunachal Pradesh	2	6
Assam	466	1415
Bihar	4482	1
Chhattisgarh	420	2
Goa	1	0
Gujarat	555	0
Haryana	178	808
Himachal Pradesh	152	3
Jammu and Kashmir	12	0
Jharkhand	164	302
Karnataka	15	58
Kerala	30	20
Madhya Pradesh	1532	22
Maharashtra	796	30
Manipur	13	36
Meghalaya	1	22
Mizoram	0	0
Nagaland	0	1
Odisha	74	54
Punjab	1188	1
Rajasthan	420	13
Sikkim	0	0
Tamil Nadu	183	99
Telangana	285	74
Tripura	53	10
Uttar Pradesh	4029	0
Uttarakhand	21	0
West Bengal	455	92

- Due to non-receipt of data from West Bengal in time for 2019, data furnished for 2018 has been used

Sources :

=== Estimates of unreported rapes ===
Most rapes go unreported because the rape victims fear retaliation and humiliation, both in India and throughout the world. Indian parliamentarians have stated that the rape problem in India is being underestimated because many cases are not reported, even though more victims are increasingly coming out and reporting rape and sexual assaults.

Few states in India have tried to estimate or survey unreported cases of sexual assault. The estimates for unreported rapes in India vary widely. The National Crime Records Bureau report of 2006 mentioned that about 71% rape crimes go unreported. Marital rape is not a criminal act in India though sexual intercourse with wife aged between 15 and 18 years is considered as rape. Madiha Kark estimates 54% of rape crimes are unreported. A UN study of 57 countries estimates just 11% of rape and sexual assault cases worldwide are ever reported.

=== Convictions ===
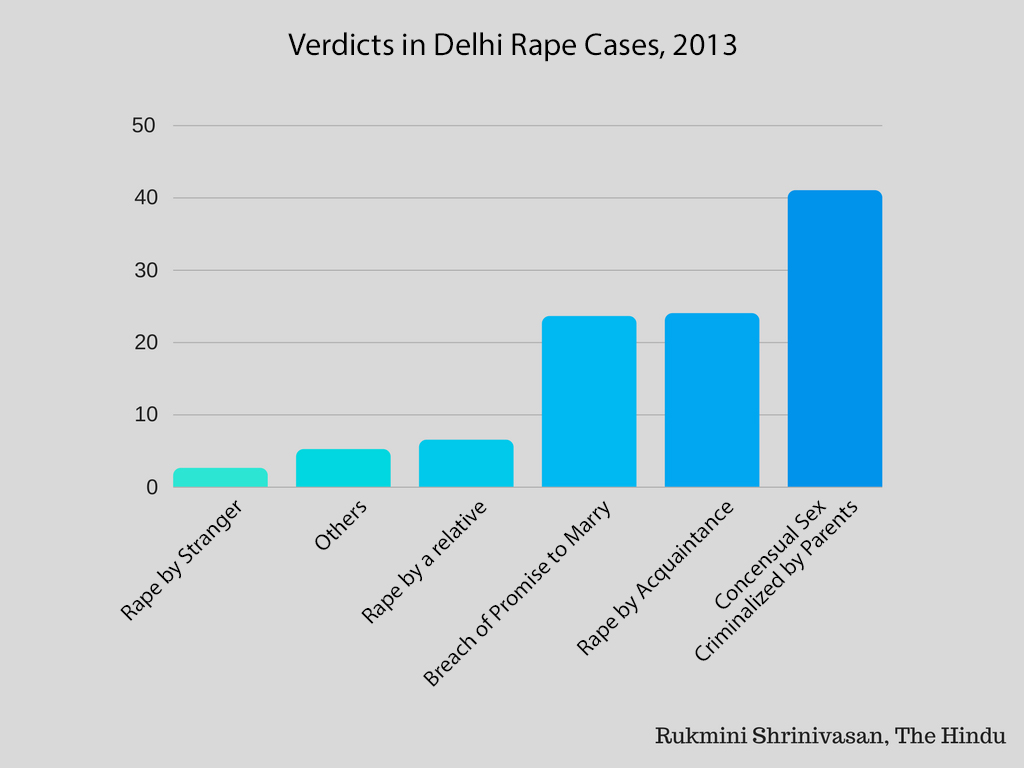
Verdicts in Delhi Rape Cases, 2013

Only one in four reported rape cases in India result in convictions.

Conviction rates
Year	Rate (%)
1973	44.3
1983	37.7
2009	26.9
2010	26.6
2011	26.4
2012	24.2
2013	27.1
2017	32.2
2018	27.2
2019	27.8

== Notable incidents ==
=== Ajmer rape case ===
In 1992, the Ajmer rape case was one of India's biggest cases of coerced sexual exploitation, with more than a hundred underage schoolgirls estimated to have been sexually molested and raped. Most accused were from the Ajmer Dargah of Moinuddin Chishti.

=== 2012 Delhi gang rape case ===
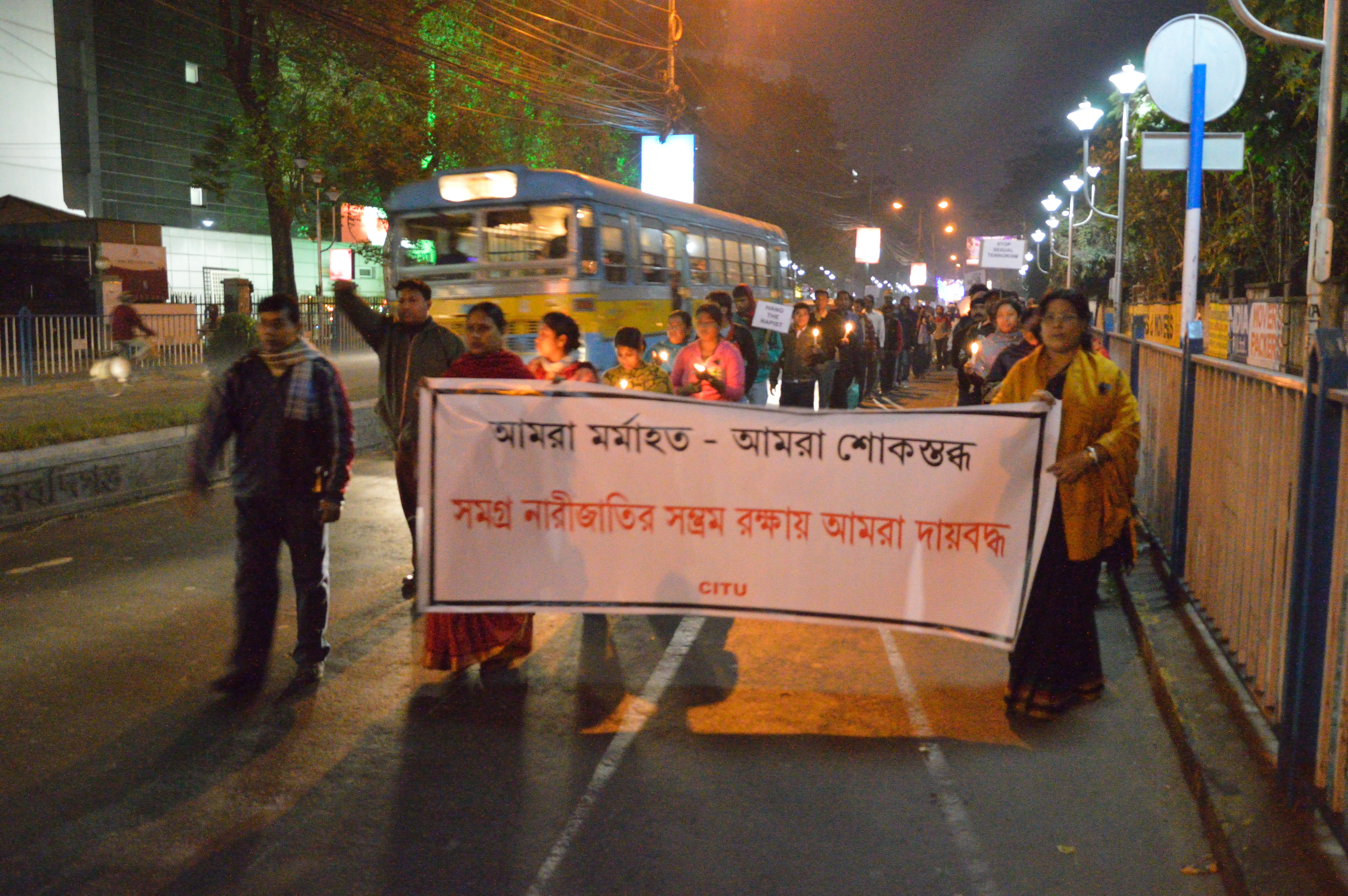
People silently marching to protest with candlelight at Salt Lake City in Kolkata after the female victim's death on 29 December 2012

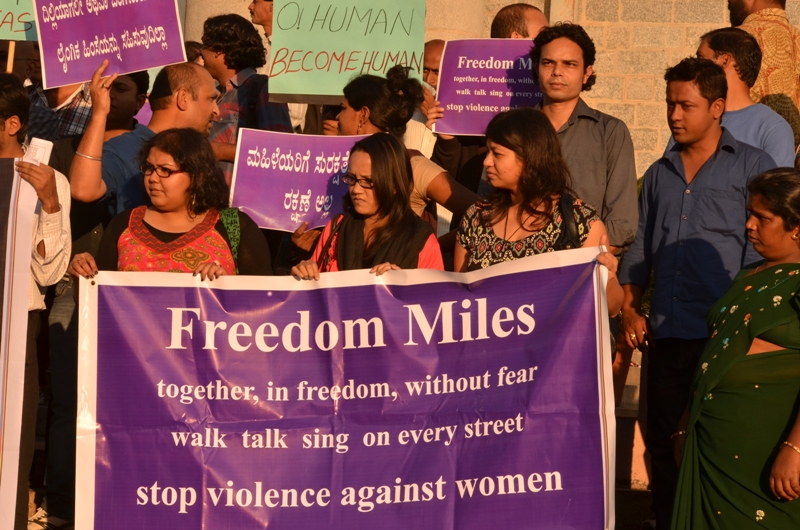
People in Bangalore protesting outside Bangalore Town Hall on 30 December 2012 demanding justice for the 23-year-old student who was gang-raped in Delhi on 16 December 2012

The gang rape of a 23-year-old student on a public bus, on 16 December 2012, sparked large protests across the capital Delhi. The victim was with a male friend who was severely beaten with an iron rod during the incident. This same rod was used to penetrate her so severely that the victim's intestines had to be surgically removed, before her death thirteen days after the attack.

The following day, there was an uproar in the Indian parliament over the incident. MPs in both houses had set aside their regular business to discuss the case and demanded strict punishment for those who carried out the attack. The Leader of the Opposition in the Lok Sabha, Sushma Swaraj, demanded that "the rapists should be hanged". Thousands of people, mostly young, participated in a massive demonstration on 22 December in protest. Police arrested six men suspected of rape. One of them, a 17-year-old juvenile, was jailed while among the five remaining culprits (who were adults), one committed suicide before trial while the other four were hanged in 2020 for murder.

=== 2013 Mumbai gang rape ===
In August 2013, in the Shakti Mills gang rape case, a 22-year-old photojournalist, who was interning with an English-language magazine in Mumbai, was gang-raped by five persons, including a juvenile, in the deserted Shakti Mills compound, near Mahalaxmi in South Mumbai, where she had gone with a male colleague on an assignment. This caused protests throughout the country since Mumbai with its very active nightlife was previously considered a safe haven for women. The city sessions court found the accused guilty and sentenced the three repeat offenders to death, making them the first in the country to get the death sentence stipulated under the newly enacted Section 376E of the Indian Penal Code. However, on 25 November 2021, the Bombay High Court commuted the three death sentences to life imprisonment.

=== Ranaghat case ===
On 14 March 2015, a 71-year-old nun was gang raped in Ranaghat, West Bengal, by intruders at the Convent of Jesus and Mary. The six intruders were recorded on CCTV during their crime of ransacking the chapel, destroying religious items, looting cash and the gang rape. Six men were arrested and charged with the crime by 1 April 2015, and identified to be Bangladeshi Muslims.

=== Delta Meghwal rape case ===
On 29 March 2016, the corpse of Delta Meghwal, a 17-year-old Dalit girl, was found in her hostel's water tank. Following the registration of the police case the hostel warden, physical education teacher and principal were arrested by Bikaner police and kept under judicial custody. The State eventually acceded to a CBI inquiry after the issue became politicised.

=== Kathua rape case ===
On 17 January 2018, Asifa, an 8-year-old minor girl, was raped and murdered in Rasana village near Kathua in Jammu and Kashmir. The incident made national news when charges were filed against eight men in April 2018. The arrests of the accused led to protests from groups, one of which was attended by two ministers from the Bharatiya Janata Party, both of whom have now resigned. The rape and murder, as well as the support the accused received, sparked widespread outrage.

=== Unnao rape case ===
The Unnao rape case saw an allegation that lawmaker Kuldeep Singh Sengar had raped a 17-year-old girl in 2017. In 2018, the alleged victim's father was jailed under the Arms Act, and died in prison after being allegedly beaten up by Sengar's brother and several others. Also in 2018, a witness to the alleged assault, Yunus, died and was immediately buried by his family with no autopsy and no communication to police or investigators. Yunus' wife and family said Yunus had been ill and died a natural death. The uncle of the alleged victim was arrested and jailed in 2018 due to an 18-year-old gun-firing case. In 2019, a truck with blackened license plates hit the car in which the alleged victim and others were riding in. As a result, the victim's paternal and maternal aunts were killed. The alleged victim and her lawyer were critically injured. The police officers assigned to provide security for the alleged victim were not present, with the explanation that there was no space in the car in which the alleged victim was travelling.

=== Jammu and Kashmir ===
There have been allegations of rape and mass rape in Jammu and Kashmir. Reports have shown that rape has been carried out by both Indian armed forces personnel and Islamist militant groups.

Rapes by Islamic militants have been reported since the Indo-Pakistani War of 1947. On 22 October 1947, Pashtun militants invaded Baramulla in a Pakistan army truck, and raped women including European nuns. In March 1990, Mrs. M. N. Paul, the wife of a BSF inspector was kidnapped, tortured and gang-raped for many days. Then her body with broken limbs was abandoned on a road.

The International Commission of Jurists stated that though the attack had not been proven beyond a doubt, there was credible evidence that it had happened. In 2011, the State Human Rights Commission (SHRC) asked for the reopening of the case.

Militant organisations such as Hizb-ul-Mujahideen, Jamiat-ul-Mujahideen and Harkat ul-Ansar have been accused of carrying out rapes. The Jammu Kashmir Liberation Front has been accused of ethnic cleansing by using murder, arson, and rape as a weapon of war to drive out hundreds of thousands of Hindu Kashmiri Pandits from the region. Following the rise of rapes by the Indian armed forces and militants, HRW submitted that the victims of rape suffer ostracism and that there is a "code of silence and fear" that prevents people from reporting such abuse. According to HRW, the investigation of cases of rape by Indian forces and militants is difficult because many Kashmiris are reluctant to discuss it for fear of violent reprisals.

=== Northeast India ===
Human rights groups allege that the Indian armed forces, under the protection of the Armed Forces (Special Powers) Act, 1958, have carried out a large number of rapes in the north-eastern states of Nagaland, Assam and Manipur. Karlsson writes that there are reports that much of the violence against civilians, including sexual assault, is inflicted by the rebel groups and armed criminal gangs in the region.

=== Uttar Pradesh ===
There is wide discrepancy among reports of rape and sexual assault. For example, according to the People's Union for Civil Liberties (PUCL), the majority of those assaulted in 2007 were poor women from remote areas and Dalits. SR Darapuri of the PUCL alleged, "I analysed the rape figures for 2007 and I found that 90% of victims were Dalits and 85% of Dalit rape victims were underage girls." Darapuri allegations do not match with the data compiled by National Crime Records Bureau of India, which found 6.7% of rape and sexual assault victims were Dalits in 2007, where nearly 16% of Indian population is classified as Dalit. There were 391 cases of rape of Dalit victims reported in Uttar Pradesh in 2013 or about 1 per 100,000 Dalits in the state of about 200 million people (21% of which is classified as Dalit).

== During riots ==
In recent years, numerous rapes have been committed during communal riots. After the 2002 Godhra train burning, in certain parts of Gujarat, rape of women was carried out by rioters. Thirteen rape and assault cases were reported during the 2013 Muzaffarnagar riots.

== The partition of India ==
During the partition of India, some 100,000 women said that they were kidnapped and raped.

== Disputed rape cases ==
=== Potential abuse concerns ===
In April 2013, Judge Virender Bhat suggested that relying upon the sole attestation of the victim became "an easy weapon" to incriminate anyone in rape case. Justice Kailash Ghambhir of the Delhi High Court stated that penal provisions for rape are often being misused by women as a "weapon for vengeance and vendetta" to harass and blackmail their male friends by filing false cases to extort money and to force them to get married. Saamna, the mouthpiece of the Shiv Sena, in an editorial noted while supporting the Deputy Inspector General Of Police in Mumbai in an alleged rape complaint that it has become "a fashion to create sensation by charging someone for rape and molestation" while Shonee Kapoor, founder of Sahodar Men's Rights Group, demanded that the name of the accused not be made public till conviction. Retired Supreme Court Justice B.N. Srikrishna also argued to keep the accused anonymous. Citing the low conviction rate in rape cases, he said, "There is no doubt that rape laws are being misused in the country."

In 2014, as per a report submitted by the Delhi Commission for women, 53% of reported rapes in 2012–13 were found to be 'false'. This report included cases that were dropped before trial in its count of false cases, without distinguishing between coerced withdrawals and false allegations.

According to an investigation by The Hindu, which only considered the cases that went to full trial, out of 460 such cases in Delhi district courts in 2013, only 2% (12) were found to have been committed by strangers. 41% (189) of these cases were filed by parents to criminalize and end consented sexual relationships, 24% (109) were filed under 'breach of promise to marry' and 30% (141) were found to be committed by acquaintances and relatives. In January 2019, the Supreme Court ruled that men who have consensual sex with a woman, and later decline to marry her for any reason, cannot be charged with rape.

=== Notable cases ===
In 1991, the 4 Rajputana Rifles unit are alleged to have entered the village of Kunan Poshpora and raped between 30 and 100 women aged between 13 and 70. The Indian government carried out three inquiries into the allegations and concluded that it had been a hoax.

In May 2014 two girls aged 14 and 16 were allegedly gang raped and murdered in the northern state of Uttar Pradesh, though later investigations have alleged suicide as the cause of death in this instance. Two police officers were suspected of involvement in the crimes.

== Tourist advisories ==
Several countries, including the United Kingdom, Canada, and the United States, have issued travel advisories for India recommending that women travelers exercise caution, particularly when traveling alone or at night, avoid isolated areas, and respect local customs and dress codes.

In March 2013, a Swiss couple who were cycling from Orchha to Agra, decided to camp for a night in a village in Datia District. There they were physically assaulted by eight locals, robbed, the man was overpowered and tied up, while the 39-year-old woman was gang-raped in front of her husband. The Swiss government issued a travel advisory in 2013 about the "increasing numbers of rapes and other sexual offences" happening in India.

The news coverage of the rapes and updated travel advisories have worried the Indian tourism industry. Some media reports stated that high-profile rape cases had led to tourist numbers to drop 20 to 30 per cent compared to previous year. The Assocham agency found that of 1200 businesses surveyed more than 70% reported cancellations by female tourists from Britain, the U.S. and Canada along with a 25% decline overall. However, tourist arrivals in India increased from 6.5 million in 2012 to 6.8 million in 2013. Tourist arrivals in 2014 observed another 10% increase over 2013 levels.

In January 2015, the Tourism Ministry of India introduced emergency helplines for female tourists. The Indian government announced in April 2015, that tourists are now being given a "welcome card" by the immigration officer on arrival with resources to ensure their safety, that GPS-embedded tracking systems are being introduced in all taxis, and tourist helplines in 12 foreign languages have been instituted.

In a non-tourism related case, Russia issued travel advisory to its citizens after a Russian national was raped in December 2009. The case was widely covered after a member of Indian parliament Shantaram Laxman Naik blamed the victim and the media for over emphasising the Russian rape case after, "she was raped by a state politician in his car after they had dinner together". Naik was criticised by leaders of Indian political parties including CPI-M, BJP and SP for blaming the rape victim and media.

== Legal response ==
The Indian law prior to the Nirbhaya Incident took into account only acts of penile-vaginal intercourse within the definition of rape and forcible acts of penetration of vagina, mouth, urethra or anus through penis or an inanimate object did not fall within the definition of rape. Many rapists were not prosecuted because there was no law to punish such acts. The definition was expanded in 2013 to consider rape as any act like penetration by penis, or any object or any part of body to any extent, into the vagina, mouth, urethra or anus of a woman or making her to do so with another person or applying of mouth to sexual organs without the consent or will of the woman constitutes the offence of rape.

The section has also clarified that penetration means "penetration to any extent", and lack of physical resistance is immaterial for constituting an offence. Except in certain aggravated situations, the punishment will be imprisonment not less than seven years but which may extend to imprisonment for life, and shall also be liable to fine. In aggravated situations, punishment will be rigorous imprisonment for a term which shall not be less than ten years but which may extend to imprisonment for life, and shall also be liable to fine.

Section 53A of the Code of Criminal Procedure of the Indian law lays down certain provisions for medical examination of the accused. Section 164A of the Code of Criminal Procedure deals with the medical examination of the victim.

The revised statutes of 2013 Indian law, in section 376A, mandate minimum punishment in certain cases. For instance, if the sexual assault inflicts an injury which causes death or causes the victim to be in a persistent vegetative state, then the convicted rapist must be sentenced to rigorous imprisonment of at least twenty years and up to the remainder of the natural life or with a death penalty." In the case of "gang rape", the same mandatory sentencing is now required by law. The convicted is also required to pay compensation to the victim which shall be reasonable to meet the medical expenses and rehabilitation of the victim, and per Section 357 B in the Code of Criminal Procedure. Death penalty for the most extreme rape cases is specified.

The 2013 law also increased the age of consent from 16 years to 18 years, and any sexual activity with anyone younger than age of 18, irrespective of consent, now constitutes statutory rape.

The new law has made it mandatory for all government and privately run hospitals in India to give free first aid and medical treatment to victims of rape.

As well, in May 2013, the Supreme Court of India held that the two-finger test on a rape victim violates her right to privacy, and asked the Delhi government to provide better medical procedures to confirm sexual assault.

On 3 November 2015 the Allahabad High Court observed that a child born out of rape will have inheritance rights over the property of the assaulter and will be treated as illegitimate. However, if the child is taken for adoption then he/she will not have any rights on the property of the biological father.

=== National Database on Sexual Offenders (NDSO) ===
The government, on 20 September 2018, launched the National Database on Sexual Offenders (NDSO). The database contains entries of offenders convicted under charges of rape, gang rape, POCSO and eve teasing. The portal as of now contains 440,000 entries of cases that have been reported since 2008. It's managed by the National Crime Records Bureau. The database is accessible only to the law enforcement agencies for investigation and monitoring purposes.

=== Fast-track courts ===
As a result of the 2012 Delhi gang rape case, the Indian government implemented a fast-track court system to rapidly prosecute rape cases. The fast-track court system has been welcomed by some, but its fairness has been questioned by legal experts and scholars. The legal scholars state that the fast-track courts may not be fair in an impoverished country where millions of cases are backlogged, and there are an average of just 14 judges per million people – among the lowest in a United Nations study of 65 nations. They have also argued that fast-track courts may divert judicial resources and delay prosecution of other crimes. They noted that Delhi state had instituted five fast-track courts in 2013 to handle rape cases, but there were no fast-track courts for murder. Mrinal Satish, of New Delhi's National Law University said, "there is a risk that in this emotional response and clamour for immediate justice, we could end up putting innocent people in prison".

=== Marital rape ===
Marital rape is not a criminal offence within Indian legal framework, except during the period of judicial separation of the partners. The marital rape exception, that is exception 2 of section 63 of the Bharatiya Nyaya Sanhita, states that sexual intercourse by a man with his own wife, the wife not being under 18 years of age, is not rape. In the 1980s, women's rights groups lobbied for marital rape to be declared unlawful. Government officials argued that the contract of marriage presupposes consent to sex and that criminalising marital rape in turn would degrade family values in India. Forced sex by husbands upon wives does have legal consequences in Indian matrimonial law, in that it can be treated as a matrimonial fault, resulting in dissolution of the marriage. All religious personal laws and the secular law governing marriage and divorce in India deem ‘cruelty’ by one spouse to the other to be a ground for divorce. The originally enacted Hindu Marriage Act, 1955 provided that in order to constitute a cause for divorce, an act of cruelty should be such that it ‘produces a reasonable apprehension in the mind of the petitioner that it will be harmful or injurious for the petitioner to live with the other party.’ Marital rape also amounts to ‘sexual abuse’ under the law regarding domestic violence enacted in 2005, under which aggrieved wives or female live-in partners can claim civil remedies, like injunction against violence, dispossession from home or direction to the husband/partner to pay maintenance. The law kicks in to regulate sexual violence in marriage only in cases when it is accompanied by extreme physical violence or when the health and safety of the wife is endangered, as in the case of minor wives.

This exception has restricted application when the wife has been living separately from the husband, with or without a decree of judicial separation. In such cases, the husband can be prosecuted for rape. If convicted, the minimum punishment is imprisonment for two years and imposition of a fine (Section 376B, IPC). This clause was ratified in the year 1983, a period of great upheaval in the history of rape law reform in India, when major changes were made for the first time since enactment of rape laws by the colonial state in 1860. The parliamentary committee that gave final shape to the 1983 amendments was disinclined to treating non-consensual sex between a separated couple as amounting to rape, on the grounds that a rape charge would heighten the possibilities of divorce by making reconciliation that much harder for the couple. Hence, the minimum sentence stipulated for this category of rape was set much lower than usual.

Until 2017, there was a discrepancy between two sub clauses of Section 375. Exception 2 stated that "sexual intercourse by a man with his own wife, the wife not being under fifteen years of age, is not rape." However, the same provision stated that a man is said to commit rape if he has sexual relations with a woman with or without her consent, when she is under 18 years of age. Independent Thought, a non-governmental organisation, in a petition in 2013, had challenged Exception 2. In a landmark ruling on 11 October 2017, the supreme court upheld the age of consent as 18 years. The court held that the distinction made between a married girl child and an unmarried girl child was illogical and ran against the provisions of the Protection of Children from Sexual Offences Act, 2012. Such a distinction also violated a child's right to liberty and dignity under Article 21 of the Constitution. Two other significant statutes undermined by the original IPC section were the Prohibition of Child Marriage Act, 2006 and the Juvenile Justice Act, both of which define a child as someone below the age of 18.

=== Education programmes ===
In February 2017, the Ministry of Health and Family Welfare unveiled resource material relating to health issues to be used as a part of a nationwide adolescent peer-education plan called Saathiya. Among other subjects, the material discusses relationships and consent. The material states, "Yes, adolescents frequently fall in love. They can feel attraction for a friend or any individual of the same or opposite sex. It is normal to have special feelings for someone. It is important for adolescents to understand that such relationships are based on mutual consent, trust, transparency and respect. It is alright to talk about such feelings to the person for whom you have them but always in a respectful manner. ... Boys should understand that when a girl says 'no' it means no."

== See also ==
- Violence against women in India
- Dark figure of crime
- Feminism in India
- Gender inequality in India
- Rape of males
- Slut-shaming
- Victim blaming
