= Indian Penal Code =

Erstwhile Penal code of Republic of India

Indian Penal Code, 1860

Imperial Legislative Council
- Long title: An Act to provide a general penal code for India
- Citation: Act No. 45 of 1860
- Territorial extent: India
- Enacted by: Imperial Legislative Council
- Enacted: 6 October 1860
- Assented to: 6 October 1860
- Commenced: 1 January 1862
- Repealed: 1 July 2024
- Committee report: First Law Commission

Amended by
- see Amendments

Repealed by
- Bharatiya Nyaya Sanhita

Related legislation
- Code of Criminal Procedure, 1973
- Status: Repealed

The Indian Penal Code (IPC) was the official criminal code of the Republic of India, inherited from British India after independence. It remained in force until it was repealed and replaced by the Bharatiya Nyaya Sanhita (BNS) in December 2023, which came into effect on July 1, 2024. It was a comprehensive code intended to cover all substantive aspects of criminal law. The Code was drafted on the recommendations of the first Law Commission of India established in 1834 under the Charter Act 1833 under the chairmanship of Thomas Babington Macaulay. It came into force in the Indian Subcontinent during the British rule in 1862. However, it did not apply automatically in the Princely states, which had their own courts and legal systems until the 1940s. While in force, the IPC was amended several times and was supplemented by other criminal provisions.

Despite promulgation of the BNS, litigation for all relevant offences committed before 1 July 2024 will continue to be registered under the IPC.

== History ==
The draft of the Indian Penal Code was prepared by the First Law Commission, chaired by Thomas Babington Macaulay in 1834 and was submitted to Governor-General of India Council in 1835. Based on a simplified codification of the law of England at the time, elements were also derived from the Napoleonic Code and Edward Livingston's Louisiana Civil Code of 1825. The first final draft of the Indian Penal Code was submitted to the Governor-General of India in Council in 1837, but the draft was again revised. The drafting was completed in 1850 and the code was presented to the Legislative Council in 1856, but it did not take its place on the statute book of British India until a generation later, following the Indian Rebellion of 1857. The draft then underwent a very careful revision at the hands of Barnes Peacock, who later became the first chief justice of the Calcutta High Court, and the future puisne judges of the Calcutta High Court, who were members of the Legislative Council, and was passed into law on 6 October 1860. The code came into operation on 1 January 1862. Macaulay did not survive to see the penal code he wrote come into force, having died near the end of 1859. The code came into force in Jammu and Kashmir on 31 October 2019, by virtue of the Jammu and Kashmir Reorganisation Act, 2019, and replaced the state's Ranbir Penal Code.

On 11 August 2023, the government introduced a bill in the Lok Sabha to replace the Indian Penal Code with a draft code called the Bharatiya Nyaya Sanhita (BNS).

== Objective ==
The objective of this Act is to provide a general penal code for India. Though not the initial objective, the Act does not repeal the penal laws which were in force at the time of coming into force in India. This was done because the code does not contain all the offences and it was possible that some offences might have still been left out of the code, which were not intended to be exempted from penal consequences. Though this code consolidates the whole of the law on the subject and is exhaustive on the matters in respect of which it declares the law, many more penal statutes governing various offences have been created in addition to the code.

== Structure ==
The Indian Penal Code, 1860, subdivided into 23 chapters, comprises 511 sections. The code starts with an introduction, provides explanations and exceptions used in it, and covers a wide range of offences. The outline is presented in the following table:

Indian Penal Code, 1860 (Sections 1 to 511)
Chapter	Sections covered	Classification of offences
Chapter I	Sections 1 to 5	Introduction
Chapter II	Sections 6 to 52	General Explanations
Chapter III	Sections 53 to 75	Of Punishments
Chapter IV	Sections 76 to 106	General Exceptions of the Right of Private Defence (Sections 96 to 106)
Chapter V	Sections 107 to 120	Of Abetment
Chapter VA	Sections 120A to 120B	Criminal Conspiracy
Chapter VI	Sections 121 to 130	Of Offences against the State
Chapter VII	Sections 131 to 140	Of Offences relating to the Army, Navy and Air Force
Chapter VIII	Sections 141 to 160	Of Offences against the Public Tranquillity
Chapter IX	Sections 161 to 171	Of Offences by or relating to Public Servants
Chapter IXA	Sections 171A to 171I	Of Offences Relating to Elections
Chapter X	Sections 172 to 190	Of Contempts of Lawful Authority of Public Servants
Chapter XI	Sections 191 to 229	Of False Evidence and Offences against Public Justice
Chapter XII	Sections 230 to 263	Of Offences relating to coin and Government Stamps
Chapter XIII	Sections 264 to 267	Of Offences relating to Weight and Measures
Chapter XIV	Sections 268 to 294	Of Offences affecting the Public Health, Safety, Convenience, Decency and Morals.
Chapter XV	Sections 295 to 298	Of Offences relating to Religion
Chapter XVI	Sections 299 to 377	Of Offences affecting the Human Body.: Of Offences Affecting Life including murder, culpable homicide (Sections 299 to 311); Of the Causing of Miscarriage, of Injuries to Unborn Children, of the Exposure of Infants, and of the Concealment of Births (Sections 312 to 318); Of Hurt (Sections 319 to 338); Of Wrongful Restraint and Wrongful Confinement (Sections 339 to 348); Of Criminal Force and Assault (Sections 349 to 358); Of Kidnapping, Abduction, Slavery and Forced Labour (Sections 359 to 374); Sexual Offences including rape and Sodomy (Sections 375 to 377)
Chapter XVII	Sections 378 to 462	Of Offences Against Property: Of Theft (Sections 378 to 382); Of Extortion (Sections 383 to 389); Of Robbery and Dacoity (Sections 390 to 402); Of Criminal Misappropriation of Property (Sections 403 to 404); Of Criminal Breach of Trust (Sections 405 to 409); Of the Receiving of Stolen Property (Sections 410 to 414); Of Cheating (Section 415 to 420); Of Fraudulent Deeds and Disposition of Property (Sections 421 to 424); Of Mischief (Sections 425 to 440); Of Criminal Trespass (Sections 441 to 462)
Chapter XVIII	Section 463 to 489 -E	Offences relating to Documents and Property Marks: Offences relating to Documents (Section 463 to 477-A); Offences relating to Property and Other Marks (Sections 478 to 489); Offences relating to Currency Notes and Bank Notes (Sections 489A to 489E)
Chapter XIX	Sections 490 to 492	Of the Criminal Breach of Contracts of Service
Chapter XX	Sections 493 to 498	Of Offences related to marriage
Chapter XXA	Sections 498A	Of Cruelty by Husband or Relatives of Husband
Chapter XXI	Sections 499 to 502	Of Defamation
Chapter XXII	Sections 503 to 510	Of Criminal intimidation, Insult and Annoyance
Chapter XXIII	Section 511	Of Attempts to Commit Offences

A detailed list of all IPC laws which include above is here.

=== Unnatural Offences- Section 377 ===
"Whoever, voluntarily has carnal intercourse against the order of nature with any man, woman or animal, shall be punished with imprisonment of life, or with imprisonment of either description for a term which may extend to ten years, and shall also be liable to fine.

Explanation.-Penetration is sufficient to constitute the carnal intercourse necessary to the offence described in this section."

- The Delhi High Court, on 2 July 2009, gave a liberal interpretation to Section 377 and laid down that this section can not be used to punish an act of consensual sexual intercourse between two same-sex individuals.
- On 11 December 2013, in Suresh Kumar Koushal & another v. Naz Foundation & others, the Supreme Court of India overruled the judgment given by the Delhi High court in 2009 and clarified that "Section 377, which holds same-sex relations unnatural, does not suffer from unconstitutionality". The Bench said: "We hold that Section 377 does not suffer from ... unconstitutionality and the declaration made by the Division Bench of the High Court is legally unsustainable." It, however, also said: "Notwithstanding this verdict, the competent legislature shall be free to consider the desirability and propriety of deleting Section 377 from the statute book or amend it as per the suggestion made by Attorney-General G.E. Vahanvati."
- On 8 January 2018, the Supreme Court agreed to reconsider its 2013 decision and after much deliberation agreed to decriminalise the parts of Section 377 that criminalised same-sex relations on 6 September 2018. The judgement of Suresh Kumar Koushal v. Naz Foundation was overruled.

=== Attempt to Commit Suicide – Section 309 ===
"Whoever attempts to commit suicide and does any act towards the commission of such offence, shall be punished with simple imprisonment for a term which may extend to one year or with fine, or with both."

Section 309 of the Indian Penal Code deals with suicide attempts, whereby attempting to die by suicide is punishable with imprisonment of up to one year. Considering long-standing demand and recommendations of the Law Commission of India, which has repeatedly endorsed the repeal of this section, the Government of India in December 2014, decided to decriminalise attempts to die by suicide by dropping Section 309 of the IPC from the statute book. In February 2015, the Legislative Department of the Ministry of Law and Justice was asked by the Government to prepare a draft Amendment Bill in this regard.

In an August 2015 ruling, the Rajasthan High Court made the Jain practice of undertaking voluntary death by fasting at the end of a person's life, known as Santhara, punishable under sections 306 and 309 of the IPC. This led to some controversy, with some sections of the Jain community urging the Prime Minister to move the Supreme Court against the order. On 31 August 2015, the Supreme Court admitted the petition by Akhil Bharat Varshiya Digambar Jain Parishad and granted leave. It stayed the decision of the High Court and lifted the ban on the practice.

Section 115(1) of the Mental Healthcare Act, 2017 effectively decriminalised suicide, saying "anyone who attempts suicide shall be presumed, unless proved otherwise, to have severe stress and shall not be tried and punished under the said Code."

The Bharatiya Nyaya Sanhita, officially decriminalized attempted suicide by not including an equivalent section to Section 309.

=== Adultery – Section 497 ===
"Whoever has sexual intercourse with a person who is and whom he knows or has reason to believe to be the wife of another man, without the consent or connivance of that man, such sexual intercourse not amounting to the offence of rape, is guilty of the offence of adultery, and shall be punished with imprisonment of either description for a term which may extend to five years, or with fine, or with both. In such case the wife shall not be punishable as an abettor."

Section 497 of the Indian Penal Code has been criticised on the one hand for allegedly treating women as the private property of her husband, and on the other hand for giving women complete protection against punishment for adultery. Another criticism was that it allowed the state to overreach into its citizens' personal sphere by criminalising voluntary sexual intercourse. Therefore, another major concern was the right to sexual privacy.

This section was unanimously struck down on 27 September 2018 by a five-judge bench of the Supreme Court in case of Joseph Shine v. Union of India as being unconstitutional and demeaning to the dignity of women. Adultery continues to be a ground for seeking divorce in a Civil Court, but is no longer a criminal offence in India.

Adultery was omitted under Bharatiya Nyaya Sanhita in 2024. However, BNS retains the essence of Section 498 from the IPC (Clause 84), which penalizes a man for enticing another man's wife to engage in intercourse with any person.

=== Death penalty ===
Sections 120B (criminal conspiracy), 121 (war against the Government of India), 132 (mutiny), 194 (false evidence to procure conviction for a capital offence), 302, 303 (murder, has been declared unconstitutional in the case of Mithu v. State of Punjab), 305 (abetting suicide), 364A (kidnapping for ransom), 396 (dacoity with murder), 376A (rape causing death or a persistent vegetative state), 376AB (rape on woman under twelve years of age), 376DB (gang rape on woman under twelve years of age), and 376E (repeat offender) have the death penalty as a maximum allowable punishment. There is ongoing debate about abolishing capital punishment.

== Criminal justice reforms ==
In 2003, the Malimath Committee submitted its report recommending several far-reaching penal reforms including separation of investigation and prosecution (similar to the CPS in the UK) to streamline criminal justice system. The essence of the report was a perceived need for a shift from an adversarial to an inquisitorial criminal justice system, based on the Continental European systems.

== Amendments ==
The code has been amended several times.

S. No.	Short title of amending legislation	No.	Year
1	The Repealing Act, 1870	14	1870
2	The Indian Penal Code Amendment Act, 1870	27	1870
3	The Indian Penal Code Amendment Act, 1872	19	1872
4	The Indian Oaths Act, 1873	10	1873
5	The Indian Penal Code Amendment Act, 1882	8	1882
6	The Code of Criminal Procedure, 1882	10	1882
7	The Indian Criminal Law Amendment Act, 1886	10	1886
8	The Indian Marine Act, 1887	14	1887
9	The Metal Tokens Act, 1889	1	1889
10	The Indian Merchandise Marks Act, 1889	4	1889
11	The Cantonments Act, 1889	13	1889
12	The Indian Railways Act, 1890	9	1890
13	The Indian Criminal Law Amendment Act, 1891	10	1891
14	The Amending Act, 1891	12	1891
15	The Indian Criminal Law Amendment Act, 1894	3	1894
16	The Indian Criminal Law Amendment Act, 1895	3	1895
17	The Indian Penal Code Amendment Act, 1896	6	1896
18	The Indian Penal Code Amendment Act, 1898	4	1898
19	The Currency-Notes Forgery Act, 1899	12	1899
20	The Indian Penal Code Amendment Act, 1910	3	1910
21	The Indian Criminal Law Amendment Act, 1913	8	1913
22	The Indian Elections Offences and Inquiries Act, 1920	39	1920
23	The Indian Penal Code (Amendment) Act, 1921	16	1921
24	The Indian Penal Code (Amendment) Act, 1923	20	1923
25	The Indian Penal Code (Amendment) Act, 1924	5	1924
26	The Indian Criminal Law Amendment Act, 1924	18	1924
27	The Workmen's Breach of Contract (Repealing) Act, 1925	3	1925
28	The Obscene Publications Act, 1925	8	1925
29	The Indian Penal Code (Amendment) Act, 1925	29	1925
30	The Repealing and Amending Act, 1927	10	1927
31	The Criminal Law Amendment Act, 1927	25	1927
32	The Repealing and Amending Act, 1930	8	1930
33	The Indian Air Force Act, 1932	14	1932
34	The Amending Act, 1934	35	1934
35	The Government of India (Adaptation of Indian Laws) Order, 1937	—N/a	1937
36	The Criminal Law Amendment Act, 1939	22	1939
37	The Offences on Ships and Aircraft Act, 1940	4	1940
38	The Indian Merchandise Marks (Amendment) Act, 1941	2	1941
39	The Indian Penal Code (Amendment) Act, 1942	8	1942
40	The Indian Penal Code (Amendment) Act, 1943	6	1943
41	The Indian Independence (Adaptation of Central Acts and Ordinances) Order, 1948	—N/a	1948
42	The Criminal Law (Removal of Racial Discriminations) Act, 1949	17	1949
43	The Indian Penal Code and the Code of Criminal Procedure (Amendment) Act, 1949	42	1949
44	The Adaptation of Laws Order, 1950	—N/a	1950
45	The Repealing and Amending Act, 1950	35	1950
46	The Part B States (Laws) Act, 1951	3	1951
47	The Criminal Law Amendment Act, 1952	46	1952
48	The Repealing and Amending Act, 1952	48	1952
49	The Repealing and Amending Act, 1953	42	1953
50	The Code of Criminal Procedure (Amendment) Act, 1955	26	1955
51	The Adaptation of Laws (No.2) Order, 1956	—N/a	1956
52	The Repealing and Amending Act, 1957	36	1957
53	The Criminal Law Amendment Act, 1958	2	1958
54	The Trade and Merchandise Marks Act, 1958	43	1958
55	The Indian Penal Code (Amendment) Act, 1959	52	1959
56	The Indian Penal Code (Amendment) Act, 1961	41	1961
57	The Anti-Corruption Laws (Amendment) Act, 1964	40	1964
58	The Criminal and Election Laws Amendment Act, 1969	35	1969
59	The Indian Penal Code (Amendment) Act, 1969	36	1969
60	The Criminal Law (Amendment) Act, 1972	31	1972
61	The Employees' Provident Funds and Family Pension Fund (Amendment) Act, 1973	40	1973
62	The Employees' State Insurance (Amendment) Act, 1975	38	1975
63	The Election Laws (Amendment) Act, 1975	40	1975
64	The Criminal Law (Amendment) Act, 1983	43	1983
65	The Criminal Law (Second Amendment) Act, 1983	46	1983
66	The Dowry Prohibition (Amendment) Act, 1986	43	1986
67	The Employees' Provident Funds and Miscellaneous Provisions (Amendment) Act, 1988	33	1988
68	The Prevention of Corruption Act, 1988	49	1988
69	The Criminal Law (Amendment) Act, 1993	42	1993
70	The Indian Penal Code (Amendment) Act, 1995	24	1995
71	The Information Technology Act, 2000	21	2000
72	The Election Laws (Amendment) Act, 2003	24	2003
73	The Code of Criminal Procedure (Amendment) Act, 2005	25	2005
74	The Criminal Law (Amendment) Act, 2005	2	2006
75	The Information Technology (Amendment) Act, 2008	10	2009
76	The Criminal Law (Amendment) Act, 2013	13	2013
77	The Criminal Law (Amendment) Act, 2018	22	2018
78	The Jammu and Kashmir Reorganisation Act, 2019	34	2019

== Stability and acclaim ==
The code substantially survived for over 150 years in several jurisdictions without major amendments. Nicholas Phillips, Justice of Supreme Court of the United Kingdom applauded the efficacy and relevance of the IPC while commemorating its 150 years of existence.

== Cultural references ==
Some references to specific sections (called dafā/dafa'a in Hindi-Urdu, دفعہ or दफ़ा/दफ़आ) of the IPC have entered popular speech in India, Pakistan and Bangladesh. For instance, con men are referred to as 420s (chaar-sau-bees in Hindi-Urdu) after Section 420 which covers cheating. Similarly, specific reference to section 302 ("tazīrāt-e-Hind dafā tīn-sau-do ke tehet sazā-e-maut", "punishment of death under section 302 of the Indian Penal Code"), which prescribes the punishment for murder including the death penalty, have become part of common knowledge in the region due to repeated mentions of it in Bollywood movies and regional pulp literature. Dafa 302 was also the name of a Bollywood movie released in 1975. Similarly, Shree 420 was the name of a 1955 Bollywood movie starring Raj Kapoor. and Chachi 420 was a Bollywood movie released in 1997 starring Kamal Haasan.

== See also ==
- Bharatiya Nyaya Sanhita
- Bharatiya Nagarik Suraksha Sanhita
- Bharatiya Sakshya Act, 2023
- Judiciary of India
- Indian Evidence Act
- Law enforcement in India
- Code of Criminal Procedure, 1973
- Indian Penal Code derived legislation:
  - Penal Code of Bangladesh
  - Penal Code (Malaysia)
  - Myanmar Penal Code
  - Pakistan Penal Code
  - Penal Code (Singapore)
  - Penal Code of Sri Lanka
  - Section 24 of the Crimes Ordinance in Hong Kong, derived from section 505 of the IPC
- Category:Sections of the Indian Penal Code
