= Chief Judicial Magistrate Court =

Second tier court in India

Chief Judicial Magistrate's Court or Court of Chief Judicial Magistrate (abbreviated as CJM Court) is the second tier court in the criminal court structure in India. Court of Chief Judicial Magistrate is the apex body of the Criminal Judiciary at the district level, and it is presided over by the Chief Judicial Magistrate. The Chief Judicial Magistrate shall be the in-charge of the Magistrate Courts in the districts. Every district shall have a Chief Judicial Magistrate's Court and in addition to this there shall be additional Chief Judicial Magistrate's Courts. Judicial First Class Magistrates work under the Chief Judicial Magistrate. The Chief Judicial Magistrates are appointed by the respective High courts of India. The Chief Judicial Magistrates works under principal district judge. In the hierarchy of criminal courts, the Chief Judicial Magistrate's Court is below the Principal District and Sessions Court and above the Sub-Divisional Judicial Magistrate Court and the Judicial First Class Magistrate Court.

== Jurisdiction ==
The Chief Judicial Magistrate's Court exercises jurisdiction on original side in criminal matters arising in the district. The Court of Chief Judicial Magistrate may impose any punishment prescribed by law except death or imprisonment for life or imprisonment exceeding seven years. C.J.M. exercises the criminal powers over whole the district. He/She tries the cases, in which provision of punishment is less than 7 years. The Chief Judicial Magistrate inspect the court and office of other Magistrates, functioning in the district and make monthly inspection of jail/lock up.The CJM Court has the power to conduct preliminary inquiries into criminal cases, issue search warrants, and grant bail to accused persons. It also has the authority to try cases punishable with imprisonment for a term not exceeding seven years and impose fines up to Rs. 10,000. The administrative head of the criminal courts in the judicial district is the Chief Judicial Magistrate.

- CJM Court has jurisdiction to hear appeals against the judgment of the Subordinate Magistrate courts.
- The Chief Judicial Magistrate Court has the power to award imprisonment up to seven years.
- CJM Court has jurisdiction to try criminal offenses punishable with imprisonment for a term of 3 years to 7 years.
- Original jurisdiction in criminal matters arising in the district.
- Territorial jurisdiction as determined by the respective High Courts.

== Appeals ==
An appeal against the judgment of the Chief Judicial Magistrate's Court may be filed in the District Sessions Court.

== Appointment ==
In every district (not being a metropolitan area), the High Court shall appoint a Judicial Magistrate of the first class to be the Chief Judicial Magistrate.

== Structure of Criminal Judiciary in india ==
Supreme Court of India (apex appellate court)

High Courts (apex appellate court in the states)

=== Metropolitan areas ===
- Chief Metropolitan Magistrate Courts
- Courts of Metropolitan Magistrates

=== District Level ===
District level Criminal Judiciary is given below (ascending order):

- District and Sessions Court
  - Additional Sessions Court
- Assistant Sessions Court
- Chief Judicial Magistrate Court
  - Additional Chief Judicial Magistrate Court
- Courts of Judicial Magistrate of First Class
- Courts of Judicial Magistrate of Second Class

== See also ==
- District Courts of India
- Sessions Court
- Courts of Metropolitan Magistrates, India
- Courts of Judicial Magistrate of First Class
- Courts of Judicial Magistrate of Second Class
