= Delta Meghwal rape case =

2016 murder in Nokha, Bikaner, India

On 29 March 2016, Delta Meghwal, a 17-year-old Dalit girl, was found dead at her college in Nokha, Bikaner district in the state of Rajasthan, India. Her body was found in a water tank of the Jain Adarsh Teacher Training Institute for Girls where she was a student. A First Information Report (FIR) lodged by her parents stated that she told them on 28 March that she had been raped by a teacher who, it is alleged, then killed her. Meghwal's cause of death has not yet been officially established.

== Early life ==
Delta Meghwal was born on 7 May 1999. Her father, Mahendra Ram Meghwal, is a primary school teacher and a resident of Trimohi village of Barmer district in Rajasthan.

Meghwal was pursuing second year of BSTC (Basic School Training Certificate) at the Jain Adarsh Teacher Training Institute for girls in Nokha, Bikaner.

== Incident ==
On 29 March 2016, 17-year old Delta Meghwal's body was found in a water tank at the college. The FIR filed by Meghwal's parents alleged rape and murder. It named Priya Shukla, who was warden of the college hostel, along with Vijendra Singh, who was a physical education instructor, and Ishwar Chand Baid, the college principal. Their claim was that on 28 March, Meghwal called her father and told him she had been raped. She said that Shukla had sent her to clean the room of Singh and that Singh raped her once there. There were four other women in the hostel on that day. Her father alleged that the college tried to cover up the incident and claimed it had forced a written apology signed by Meghwal and Singh which indicated consensual sex.

Following the complaint, Singh was arrested by Bikaner police and placed in custody. On 8 April 2016, with the other two named parties now in custody, the Bikaner police said that a Forensic Science Laboratory report indicated Meghwal was raped and later drowned, rather than being placed in the tank when already dead. They said this suggested it was a suicide and not murder. The Indian National Congress (INC), who were the opposition political party, said that the state's Chief Minister, Vasundhara Raje, was failing to provide justice. Raje said that the INC was engaging in votebank politics. Priya Shukla and Pragya Prateek were released on bail by Rajasthan High Court on 6 May 2016.

In April, the INC and the victim's father demanded intervention by the Central Bureau of Investigation. Soon after, it was reported that the Government of Rajasthan had recommended it but in September 2016 there was an appeal to the state governor, Kalyan Singh, to intervene because of claims that Raje had not acted on that intention.

There have been accusations that Meghwal was subjected to discrimination based on her Dalit status, such as by being asked to clean Singh's room. Members of the Dalit community have been active in demanding further investigation.

== Trial ==
According to official facts, Priya Shukla was posted as a warden in the Jain Adarsh Kanya Shikshak Prashikshan Sansthan, Nokha. The Institution reopened, after observing Holi break, on 28 March, 2016. Delta was undertaking training in the said Institution. Her father dropped her at the Hostel on 28 March at about 11 A.M. He received a call from his daughter at 8 P.M on the same day. She complained to her father that the warden of the hostel, Priya Shukla, sent her to the room of P.T.I. Vijendra Singh under the pretext of cleaning it. Vijendra Singh allegedly committed rape with the girl and threatened her that if she confided about the incident in anybody, she would be killed. On this, he advised his daughter to take leave and come back to her village. On the following day, the complainant received a call from the Nokha Police Station that the dead body of his daughter had been found in a water tank. A written report with these allegations was submitted by the complainant Mahendra Ram on 30 March at Police Station, Nokha, whereupon an F.I.R.No.146/2016 was registered for the offences under sections 376(2)(C) i.e. rape and 305 IPC i.e. abetment of suicide of child and Sections 3 (2)(V) and 3(2)(VI) of the SC/ST (Prevention of Atrocities) Act and Sections 5, 6 i.e. sexual assault and 21 of the Protection of Children from Sexual Offences Act and investigation commenced.

Sessions Case No. 163 of 2016 was initiated on 15 July 2016 i.e. 3 months, 19 days from date of incident. The case was first heard before Special Court under Prevention of Atrocities (Scheduled Caste and Scheduled Tribes) Act 1989 on 6 January 2017. After 26 hearings, prosecution evidence submission commenced on 19 December 2017 i.e. more than 17 months from beginning of trial. On October 8, 2021 i.e. 5 years after the date of incident, District and Sessions judge Dhirendra Singh Nagar held that physical training instructor Vijendra Singh was guilty of kidnapping, raping and abetting the suicide of the minor. The court also pronounced college principal Pragya Prateek Shukla and hostel warden Priya Shukla guilty of abetment to suicide.

== See also ==
- Crime in India
- Rape in India
