= Courts of Judicial Magistrate of First Class =

Judicial structure in India

Courts of Judicial Magistrate of First Class, Judicial First Class Magistrate Courts, or Judicial Magistrate First Class Courts are at the second lowest level of the Criminal Court structure in India. According to the Section 9 of the Bharatiya Nagarik Suraksha Sanhita, 2023 (BNSS), a Court of Judicial Magistrate of First Class may be established by the State Government in consultation with the High Court of the respective state at such places in the district and in any number by a notification.

According to Section 13 of the BNSS, a judicial magistrate is under the general control of the Sessions Judge and is subordinate to the Chief Judicial Magistrate.

According to Section 23 of the BNSS., a Judicial Magistrate of First Class may pass a sentence of imprisonment for a term not exceeding three years, or of fine not exceeding ten thousand rupees or of both.

== See also ==
- Courts of Metropolitan Magistrate - Have the same powers as of Judicial Magistrate of First Class in India
- Chief Judicial Magistrate Court
- Courts of Judicial Magistrate of Second Class
