= Courts of Judicial Magistrate of Second Class =

Judicial structure in India

Courts of Judicial Magistrate of Second Class are at the lowest hierarchy of the Criminal Court structure in India. According to the Section 9 of the Bharatiya Nagarik Suraksha Sanhita, 2023 (BNSS), a Court of Judicial Magistrate of Second Class may be established by the State Government in consultation with the High Court of the respective state at such places in the district and in any number by a notification.

According to Section 23(3) of the BNSS, a Judicial Magistrate of Second Class may pass a sentence of imprisonment for a term not exceeding one year, or of fine not exceeding Five thousand (in madhya pradesh 25 thousand) rupees, or of both.

A Judicial Magistrate of Second Class cannot entertain a Prayer for Police Remand while hearing for police files. If the police remand prayer is received, the same must be kept reserved and the case record must immediately be sent to Judicial Magistrate 1st Class.

A Judicial Magistrate can try such offences which is triable by either "Any Magistrate" or "Judicial Magistrate 2nd Class" as enshrined in the Schedule I & II of the BNSS.

Generally, the post for Judicial Magistrate 2nd Class is to be held for 6 months by the newly inducted officers unless the concerned Hon'ble High Court of a State pleased to seem fit to reduce or increase the time period of 6 months.

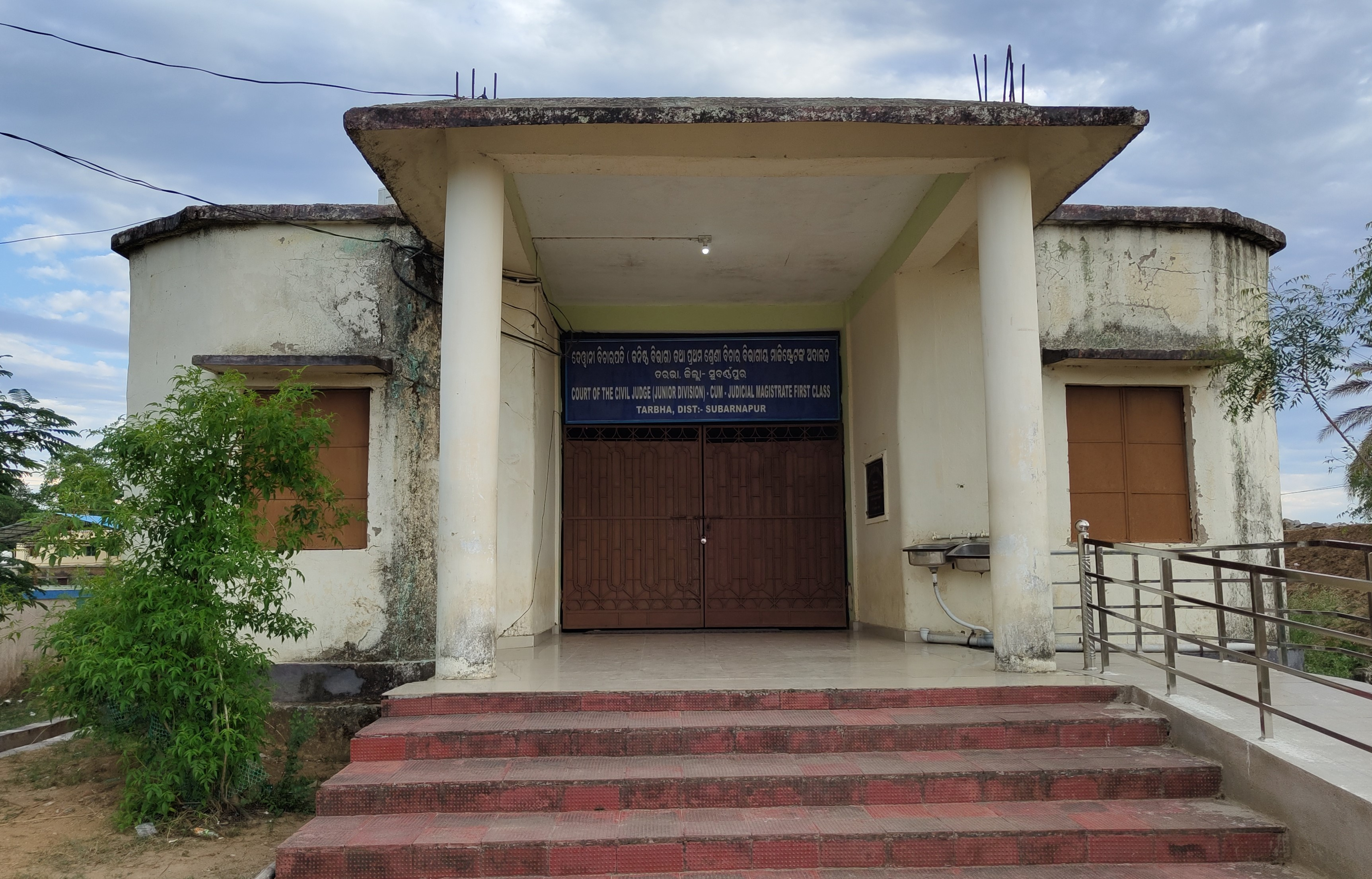
Court of the Civil Judge cum Judicial Magistrate, Tarbha.

A production Warrant issued by a Judicial Magistrate 2nd Class must be countersigned by the Chief Judicial Magistrate as per Section 302 of BNSS only on the grounds that such warrant requires the attendance of a prisoner from a prison but it does not affect the normal power of a Judicial Magistrate of Second class under section 72 of BNSS

== See also ==
- Judicial Magistrate of First Class
- Chief Judicial Magistrate
