= Courts of Metropolitan Magistrates =

Courts of Metropolitan Magistrates is a type of magistrate courts those are situated in a division headquarter or metropolitan city, found in many countries (e.g., India, Bangladesh). The presiding officers of such Courts get appointed by the High Court.

The High court appoints Chief Metropolitan Magistrate for every metropolitan court. The High court may also appoint Additional Chief Metropolitan Magistrate for an area, with all or any of the powers of a Chief Metropolitan Magistrate, as may be directed by the High Court. Other than Chief Metropolitan Magistrate and Additional Chief Metropolitan Magistrate, there are also Metropolitan Magistrates also known as Magistrate of the first class who work as subordinates of Chief Metropolitan Magistrate. Any two or more metropolitan magistrates may, subject to the rules made by the CMM, sit together as a bench. All metropolitan magistrates including the ACMMs and benches of general magistrates are subordinate to the CMM.
