= Bharatiya Nyaya Sanhita, 2023 =

Penal code of the Republic of India

Bharatiya Nyaya Sanhita, 2023 lit. 'Indian Justice Code, 2023'

Parliament of India
- Long title: An Act to Consolidate and Amend the Provisions Relating to Offences and for Matters Connected Therewith or Incidental Thereto.
- Citation: Act No. 45 of 2023
- Territorial extent: India
- Passed by: Lok Sabha
- Passed: 20 December 2023
- Passed by: Rajya Sabha
- Passed: 21 December 2023
- Assented to by: Droupadi Murmu (President of India)
- Assented to: 25 December 2023
- Commenced: 1 July 2024

Legislative history

Initiating chamber: Lok Sabha
- Bill title: The Bharatiya Nyaya (Second) Sanhita Bill, 2023
- Bill citation: Bill No. 173 of 2023
- Introduced by: Amit Shah (Home Minister)
- Introduced: 12 December 2023
- Committee responsible: Parliamentary Standing Committee
- Passed: 20 December 2023
- Voting summary: Majority Voice voted for; Minority Voice voted against

Revising chamber: Rajya Sabha
- Bill title: The Bharatiya Nyaya (Second) Sanhita Bill, 2023
- Received from the Lok Sabha: 20 December 2023
- Member(s) in charge: Amit Shah (Home Minister)
- Passed: 21 December 2023
- Voting summary: Majority Voice voted for; Minority Voice voted against

Final stages
- Finally passed both chambers: 21 December 2023

Repeals
- Indian Penal Code, 1860

Related legislation
- Bharatiya Nagarik Suraksha Sanhita and Bharatiya Sakshya Adhiniyam, 2023

Summary
- The bill seeks to replace the entire Indian Penal Code and to provide a new approach for penalties and punishments for crimes defined under a new pattern.
- Status: In force

The Bharatiya Nyaya Sanhita, 2023 (BNS; lit. 'Indian Justice Code, 2023') is the official criminal code of India. It came into effect on 1 July 2024, after being passed by the Parliament in December 2023, replacing the colonial-era Indian Penal Code of 1860 (IPC).

== Background and timeline ==
- On 11 August 2023, Amit Shah, Minister of Home Affairs, introduced the Bharatiya Nyaya Sanhita Bill, 2023 in the Lok Sabha.
- On 12 December 2023, the Bharatiya Nyaya Sanhita Bill, 2023 was withdrawn.
- On 12 December 2023, the Bharatiya Nyaya (Second) Sanhita Bill, 2023 was introduced in Lok Sabha.
- On 20 December 2023, the Bharatiya Nyaya (Second) Sanhita Bill, 2023 was passed in Lok Sabha.
- On 21 December 2023, the Bharatiya Nyaya (Second) Sanhita bill, 2023 was passed in Rajya Sabha.
- On 25 December 2023, the Bharatiya Nyaya (Second) Sanhita Bill, 2023 received the assent of the President of India.

== Changes ==
In the BNS, 20 new offences have been added to and 19 provisions in the repealed IPC have been dropped. The punishment of imprisonment has been increased for 33 offences, and fines have been increased for 83 offences. A mandatory minimum punishment has been introduced for 23 offences. A sentence of community service has been introduced for six offences.

- Offences against the body: The BNS retains the provisions of the IPC on murder, abetment of suicide, assault and causing grievous hurt. It adds new offences such as organised crime, terrorism, and murder or grievous hurt by a group on certain grounds.
- Sexual offences against women: The BNS retains the provisions of the IPC on rape, voyeurism, stalking and insulting the modesty of a woman. It increases the threshold for the victim to be classified as an adult, in the case of gang rape, from 16 to 18 years of age.
- Offences against property: The BNS retains the provisions of the IPC on theft, robbery, burglary and cheating. It adds new offences such as cybercrime and financial fraud.
- Offences against the state: The BNS removes sedition as an offence. Instead, there is a new offence for acts endangering India's sovereignty, unity and integrity.
- Offences against the public: The BNS adds new offences such as environmental pollution and human trafficking.

== Debate ==
Like Indian Penal Code, the BNS retains the marital rape exception. It retains the value laden phrase 'outraging the modesty of women' instead of replacing it with the gender-neutral term 'sexual assault'. It provides inadequate protection to victims of non-consensual intimate imagery. It does not include any provision for offences involving rape of males or of transgender individuals.

Provision for offence for acts endangering 'sovereignty or unity and integrity of India', is ambiguous, with the potential to curtail freedom of speech or to stifle dissent.

Assistant professor Faisal Fasih from West Bengal National University of Juridical Sciences said that the intent of establishing a justice-oriented system rather than a punishment-oriented one was not being seen as the reality of the change.

== Structure ==
The BNS comprises 20 chapters and 358 sections. Its structure is similar to that of the IPC. The outline of the Sanhita is as follows:

The Bharatiya Nyaya Sanhita, 2023
Chapters	Clauses	Classification of Offences
Chapter 1	Clauses 1 to 3	Preliminary
Chapter 2	Clauses 4 to 13	Of Punishments
Chapter 3	Clauses 14 to 44	General Exceptions of the Right to Private Defence (sections 34 to 44)
Chapter 4	Clauses 45 to 62	Of Abetment, Criminal Conspiracy and Attempt
Chapter 5	Clauses 63 to 99	Of Offences against Women and Children: Of Sexual Offences (63 to 73); Of criminal force and assault against women (74 to 79); Of Offences relating to marriage (80 to 87); Of causing miscarriage, etc. (88 to 99)
Chapter 6	Clauses 100 to 146	Of Offences Affecting the Human Body: Of Offences Affecting Life (100 to 113); Of Hurt (114 to 125); Of wrongful restraint and wrongful confinement (126 to 136); Of Kidnapping, Abduction, Slavery and Forced Labour (137 to 146)
Chapter 7	Clauses 147 to 158	Of Offences Against the State
Chapter 8	Clauses 159 to 168	Of Offences Relating to the Army, Navy and Air Force
Chapter 9	Clauses 169 to 177	Of Offences Relating to Elections
Chapter 10	Clauses 178 to 188	Of Offences Relating to Coins, Bank Notes, Currency Notes and Government Stamps
Chapter 11	Clauses 189 to 197	Of Offences Against the Public Tranquility
Chapter 12	Clauses 198 to 205	Of Offences by Or Relating to Public Servants
Chapter 13	Clauses 206 to 226	Of Contempt of Lawful Authority of Public Servants
Chapter 14	Clauses 227 to 269	Of False Evidence and Offences against Public Justice.
Chapter 15	Clauses 270 to 297	Of Offences affecting the Public Health, Safety, Convince, Decency and Morals
Chapter 16	Clauses 298 to 302	Of Offences Relating to Religion
Chapter 17	Clauses 303 to 334	Of Offences against Property: Of Theft (303 to 307); Of Extortion (308); Of Robbery and Dacoity (309 to 313); Of Criminal Misappropriation of Property (314 and 315); Of Criminal Breach of Trust (316); Of receiving of stolen property (317); Of Cheating (318 and 319); Of Fundamental Deeds and Disposition of Property (320 to 323); Of Mischief (324 to 328); Of Criminal Trespass (329 to 334)
Chapter 18	Clauses 335 to 350	Of Offences Relating to Documents and to Property Marks: Of Documents (335 to 344); Of Property Marks (345 to 350)
Chapter 19	Clauses 351 to 356	Of Criminal Intimidation, Insult, Annoyance, Defamation, Etc: Intimidation, Insult and Annoyance (351 to 355); Of Defamation (356); Of breach of contract to attend on and supply wants of the helpless person (357)
Chapter 20	Clause 358	Repeal and Savings (358)

== See also ==
- Bharatiya Nagarik Suraksha Sanhita
- Bharatiya Sakshya Act, 2023
