= Bharatiya Sakshya Act, 2023 =

Evidence Act of The Republic of India

Bharatiya Sakshya Adhiniyam, 2023 lit. 'Indian Evidence Act, 2023'

Parliament of India
- Long title: An Act to consolidate and to provide for general rules and principles of evidence for fair trial.
- Citation: Act No. 47 of 2023
- Territorial extent: India
- Passed by: Lok Sabha
- Passed: 20 December 2023
- Passed by: Rajya Sabha
- Passed: 21 December 2023
- Assented to by: President of India
- Assented to: 25 December 2023
- Commenced: 1 July 2024

Legislative history

Initiating chamber: Lok Sabha
- Bill title: Bharatiya Sakshya (Second) Bill, 2023
- Introduced by: Home Minister, Amit Shah
- Introduced: 12 December 2023
- Committee responsible: Parliamentary Standing Committee
- Passed: 20 December 2023
- Voting summary: Majority Voice voted for; Minority Voice voted against

Revising chamber: Rajya Sabha
- Bill title: Bharatiya Sakshya (Second) Bill, 2023
- Received from the Lok Sabha: 20 December 2023
- Member(s) in charge: Home Minister, Amit Shah
- Passed: 21 December 2023
- Voting summary: Majority Voice voted for; Minority Voice voted against

Final stages
- Finally passed both chambers: 21 December 2023

Repeals
- Indian Evidence Act, 1872

Related legislation
- Bharatiya Nyaya Sanhita, 2023; Bharatiya Nagarik Suraksha Sanhita
- Status: In force

The Bharatiya Sakshya Adhiniyam, 2023 (BSA) (IAST: Bhāratīya Sākśya Adhiniyam; lit. 'Indian Evidence Act, 2023 (IEA)') is an act of the Parliament of India.

== Background and timeline ==
- On 11 August 2023, Amit Shah, Minister of Home Affairs, introduced the Bharatiya Sakshya Bill, 2023 in Lok Sabha.
- On 12 December 2023, the Bharatiya Sakshya bill, 2023 was withdrawn.
- On 12 December 2023, the Bharatiya Sakshya (Second) bill, 2023 was introduced in Lok Sabha.
- On 20 December 2023, the Bharatiya Sakshya (Second) bill, 2023 was passed in Lok Sabha.
- On 21 December 2023, the Bharatiya Sakshya (Second) bill, 2023 was introduced in Rajya Sabha.
- On 21 December 2023, the Bharatiya Sakshya (Second) bill, 2023 was passed in Rajya Sabha.
- On 25 December 2023, the Bharatiya Sakshya (Second) bill, 2023 received the assent of the President of India.

== Structure ==
The Act consists of 170 sections as opposed to the 167 sections in the previous Indian Evidence Act. Of these 167 sections, 23 sections have been modified, five removed, and one more section added.

The Bharatiya Sakshya Adhiniyam, 2023
Part	Chapters	Section	Classification of Offences
Part 1	Chapter 1	Section 1 to 2	Preliminary
Part 2	Chapter 2	Section 3 to 50	Relevancy Of Facts (3); Closely Connected Facts (4 to 14); Admissions (15 to 25); Statements By Persons Who Cannot Be Called As Witnesses (26 to 27); Statements Made Under Special Circumstances (28 to 32); How Much Of A Statement Is To Be Proved (33); Judgments Of Courts When Relevant (34 to 38); Opinions Of Third Persons When Relevant (39 to 45); Character When Relevant (46 to 50)
Part 3 On Proof	Chapter 3	Section 51 to 53	Facts Which Need Not Be Proved
Part 3 On Proof	Chapter 4	Clauses 54 to 55	Of Oral Evidence
Part 3 On Proof	Chapter 5	Section 56 to 93	Of Documentary Evidence (56 to 73); Public documents (74 to 77); Presumptions As To Documents(78 to 93)
Part 3 On Proof	Chapter 6	Section 94 to 103	Of The Exclusion Of Oral Evidence By Documentary Evidence
Part 4 Production And Effect Of Evidence	Chapter 7	Section 104 to 120	Of The Burden Of Proof
Part 4 Production And Effect Of Evidence	Chapter 8	Section 121 to 123	Estoppel
Part 4 Production And Effect Of Evidence	Chapter 9	Section 124 to 139	Of Witnesses
Part 4 Production And Effect Of Evidence	Chapter 10	Section 140 to 168	Of Examination Of Witnesses
Part 4 Production And Effect Of Evidence	Chapter 11	Section 169	Of Improper Admission And Rejection Of Evidence
Part 4 Production And Effect Of Evidence	Chapter 12	Section 170	Repeal And Savings

== Criticism ==
The new law makes it difficult for defendants to defend themselves at court and encourages prosecutors to produce potentially dubious evidence.

== See also ==
- Bharatiya Nyaya Sanhita
- Bharatiya Nagarik Suraksha Sanhita
