= Bharatiya Nagarik Suraksha Sanhita =

Criminal Procedure Code of The Republic of India

Bharatiya Nagarik Suraksha Sanhita, 2023 lit. 'Indian Citizen Safety Code, 2023'

Parliament of India
- Long title: An act to consolidate and amend the law relating to Criminal Procedure.
- Citation: https://indiacode.gov.in/act/72592ac7-d084-4545-95d3-0c98dc49fac3/sections
- Territorial extent: India
- Passed by: Lok Sabha
- Passed: 20 December 2023
- Passed by: Rajya Sabha
- Passed: 21 December 2023
- Assented to by: President of India
- Assented to: 25 December 2023
- Commenced: 1 July 2024

Legislative history

Initiating chamber: Lok Sabha
- Bill title: The Bharatiya Nagarik Suraksha (Second) Sanhita, 2023
- Introduced by: Home Minister, Amit Shah
- Introduced: 12 December 2023
- Committee responsible: Scrutiny Panel of the Parliament
- Passed: 20 December 2023
- Voting summary: Majority Voice voted for; Minority Voice voted against

Revising chamber: Rajya Sabha
- Bill title: The Bharatiya Nagarik Suraksha (Second) Sanhita, 2023
- Received from the Lok Sabha: 20 December 2023
- Member(s) in charge: Home Minister, Amit Shah
- Passed with amendments: 21 December 2023
- Voting summary: Majority Voice voted for; Minority Voice voted against

Final stages
- Finally passed both chambers: 21 December 2023

Repeals
- Criminal Procedure Code

Related legislation
- Bharatiya Nyaya Sanhita and Bharatiya Sakshya Adhiniyam
- Status: In force

The Bharatiya Nagarik Suraksha Sanhita, 2023 (BNSS) (IAST: Bhāratīya Nāgarik Surakśa Saṃhitā; lit. 'Indian Citizen Safety Code, 2023 (ICSC) '), is the main legislation on procedure for administration of substantive criminal law in India. It replaced The Code of Criminal Procedure, 1973, commonly called Criminal Procedure Code (CrPC) in 2023.

== Background and timeline ==
- On 11 August 2023, Bharatiya Nagarik Suraksha Sanhita Bill, 2023 was introduced by Amit Shah, Minister of Home Affairs, in Lok Sabha.
- On 12 December 2023, the Bharatiya Nagarik Suraksha Sanhita Bill, 2023 was withdrawn.
- On 12 December 2023, the Bharatiya Nagarik Suraksha (Second) Sanhita Bill, 2023 was introduced in Lok Sabha.
- On 20 December 2023, the Bharatiya Nagarik Suraksha (Second) Sanhita Bill, 2023 was passed in Lok Sabha.
- On 21 December 2023, the Bharatiya Nagarik Suraksha (Second) Sanhita Bill, 2023 was passed in Rajya Sabha.
- On 25 December 2023, the Bharatiya Nagarik Suraksha (Second) Sanhita Bill, 2023 received the assent of the President of India.

== Structure ==
The BNSS comprises 39 chapters and 531 sections. In addition, there are two schedules also. The outline of the Sanhita is as follows:

The Bharatiya Nagarik Suraksha Sanhita, 2023
Chapters	Clauses	Classification of Offences
Chapter 1	Clauses 1 to 5	Preliminary
Chapter 2	Clauses 6 to 20	Constitution Of Criminal Courts And Offices
Chapter 3	Clauses 21 to 29	Power Of Courts
Chapter 4	Clauses 30 to 34	Powers Of Superior Officers Of Police And Aid To The Magistrates And The Police
Chapter 5	Clauses 35 to 62	Arrest Of Persons
Chapter 6	Clauses 63 to 93	Processes To Compel Appearance: Summons (63 to 71); Warrant Of Arrest (72 to 83); Proclamation And Attachment (84 to 89); Other rules regarding processes (90 to 93)
Chapter 7	Clauses 94 to 110	Processes To Compel The Production Of Things: Summons To Produce (94 to 95); Search-warrants (96 to 101); General Provisions Relating To Searches (102 to 104); Miscellaneous (105 to 110)
Chapter 8	Clauses 111 to 124	Reciprocal Arrangements For Assistance In Certain Matters And Procedure For Attachment And Forfeiture Of Property
Chapter 9	Clauses 125 to 143	Security For Keeping The Peace And For Good Behaviour
Chapter 10	Clauses 144 to 147	Order For Maintenance Of Wives, Children And Parents
Chapter 11	Clauses 148 to 167	Maintenance Of Public Order And Tranquillity: Unlawful Assemblies (148 to 151); Public Nuisances (152 to 162); Urgent Cases Of Nuisance Or Apprehended Danger (163); Disputes As To Immovable Property (164 to 167)
Chapter 12	Clauses 168 to 172	Preventive Action Of The Police
Chapter 13	Clauses 173 to 196	Information To The Police And Their Powers To Investigate
Chapter 14	Clauses 197 to 209	Jurisdiction Of The Criminal Courts In Inquiries And Trials
Chapter 15	Clauses 210 to 222	Conditions Requisite For Initiation Of Proceedings
Chapter 16	Clauses 223 to 226	Complaints To Magistrates
Chapter 17	Clauses 227 to 233	Commencement Of Proceedings Before Magistrates
Chapter 18	Clauses 234 to 247	The Charge: Form Of Charges (234 to 240); Joinder of charges (241 to 247)
Chapter 19	Clauses 248 to 260	Trial Before A Court Of Session
Chapter 20	Clause 261 to 273	Trial Of Warrant-cases By Magistrates: Cases Instituted On A Police Report (261 to 266); Cases Instituted Otherwise Than On Police Report (267 to 270); Conclusion Of Trial (271 to 273)
Chapter 21	Clause 271 to 282	Trial Of Summons-cases By Magistrates
Chapter 22	Clause 283 to 288	Summary Trials
Chapter 23	Clause 289 to 300	Plea Bargaining
Chapter 24	Clause 301 to 306	Attendance Of Persons Confined Or Detained In Prisons
Chapter 25	Clause 307 to 336	Evidence In Inquiries And Trials: Mode Of Taking And Recording Evidence (307 to 318); Commissions For The Examination Of Witnesses (319 to 336)
Chapter 26	Clause 337 to 366	General Provisions As To Inquiries And Trials
Chapter 27	Clause 367 to 378	Provisions As To Accused Persons Of Unsound Mind
Chapter 28	Clause 379 to 391	Provisions As To Offences Affecting The Administration Of Justice
Chapter 29	Clause 392 to 406	The Judgment
Chapter 30	Clause 407 to 412	Submission Of Death Sentences For Confirmation
Chapter 31	Clause 413 to 435	Appeals
Chapter 32	Clause 436 to 445	Reference And Revision
Chapter 33	Clause 446 to 452	Transfer Of Criminal Cases
Chapter 34	Clause 453 to 477	Execution, Suspension, Remission And Commutation Of Sentences: Death Sentences (453 to 456); Imprisonment (457 to 460); Levy Of Fine (461 to 464); General provisions regarding execution (465 to 471); Suspension, Remission And Commutation Of Sentences.e (472 to 477)
Chapter 35	Clause 478 to 496	Provisions As To Bail And Bonds
Chapter 36	Clause 497 to 505	Disposal Of Property
Chapter 37	Clause 506 to 512	Irregular Proceedings
Chapter 38	Clause 513 to 519	Limitation For Taking Cognizance Of Certain Offences
Chapter 39	Clause 519 to 531	Miscellaneous

== Changes ==
The BNSS makes a number of changes to the CrPC, some key changes are:

- Consolidating and simplifying the law: The BNSS consolidates and simplifies the law by repealing and amending a number of provisions of the CrPC.
- Strengthening the rights of the accused: The BNSS strengthens the rights of the accused by providing for safeguards, such as the right to a lawyer of choice during interrogation, though not throughout the interrogation, and the right to a fair trial. Every police officer or other person arresting any person without warrant shall forthwith communicate to him full particulars of the offence for which he is arrested or other grounds for such arrest. When any person is arrested, he shall be examined by a medical officer in the service of the Central Government or a State Government, and in case the medical officer is not available, by a registered medical practitioner soon after the arrest is made.
- Improving the efficiency of the criminal justice system: The BNSS seeks to improve the efficiency of the criminal justice system by streamlining procedures and reducing delays.

The following are some of the key changes made in the BNSS:

- Arrest: The BNSS gives the police more powers to investigate crimes and requires them to complete investigations within a specified time period.
- Trial: The BNSS streamlines the trial process and requires courts to dispose of cases within a specified time period.
- Community Service For the first time in India's penal code history, the Bharatiya Nyaya Sanhita (BNSS) introduces "Community Service" as a distinct form of punishment, marking a significant shift towards reformative justice. This provision allows courts to sentence offenders to unpaid work for the benefit of the community for specific petty offences, such as defamation, public intoxication, and attempting to commit suicide with the intent to restrain a public servant. By incorporating this alternative to imprisonment, the BNSS aims to reduce the burden on the prison system while offering a constructive avenue for rehabilitation for minor infractions.
- Section 173 of the BNSS gives statutory recognition to the concept of Zero FIR, which allows a First Information Report (FIR) to be registered at any police station, irrespective of its territorial jurisdiction. The provision mandates that information regarding a cognizable offence can be given orally or electronically to an officer-in-charge, who must register it and transfer it to the relevant jurisdictional police station.

== Analysis ==
BNSS makes the ability of the accused to secure bail, more difficult and limits the scope for plea bargaining. It empowers police officers to compel an accused to produce their digital devices to access their contents for investigation purposes. It also gives police the discretion to seize and attach the property of an accused before a trial has taken place.

For every cognisable offence punishable for three years or more but less than seven years, BNSS mandates a preliminary inquiry to be conducted by the police before an FIR can be lodged. This supersedes the Supreme Court's decision in Lalita Kumari vs Government of Uttar Pradesh in 2013, wherein the court found that investigating officers had undue powers in deciding whether an FIR was warranted.

== See also ==
- Bharatiya Nyaya Sanhita, 2023
- Bharatiya Sakshya Act, 2023
