= Courts of Metropolitan Magistrates, India =

Courts of Metropolitan Magistrate are at the second lowest level of the Criminal Court structure in India, although in some cities (those without special or executive magistrates), they de facto are the lowest level.

== Overview ==
According to the Section 16 of the Criminal Procedure Code, 1973 (CrPc), in every metropolitan area, there shall be established as many courts of Metropolitan Magistrates, and at such places, as the State Government may, after consultation with the High Court, by notification, specify. Metropolitan Courts are to be established at such places in every metropolitan area having population of ten lakh or more. It has jurisdiction throughout such metropolitan area. The presiding officers of such courts shall be appointed by the High Court.

A Metropolitan Magistrate is a first class magistrate under the general control of the District and Sessions Judge, and is subordinate to the Chief Metropolitan Magistrate. However, a civil judge may also serve as a magistrate (criminal) judge, and a district judge might also serve as a magistrate's judge.

According to Section 29 of the CrPc., a Metropolitan Magistrate (class II) may pass a sentence of imprisonment for a term not exceeding three years, or of fine not exceeding ten thousand rupees. A chief magistrate (class I), however, can pass a sentence of up to seven years.
