= Indian Evidence Act, 1872 =

Act of Imperial Legislative Council of India

The Governor-General in Council
- Citation: Act No. 1 of 1872
- Territorial extent: INDIA
- Enacted by: The Governor-General in Council
- Enacted: 15 March 1872
- Commenced: 1 September 1872
- Repealed: 1 July 2024

Repealed by
- Bharatiya Sakshya Adhiniyam
- Status: Repealed

The Indian Evidence Act, 1872, originally passed in India by the Imperial Legislative Council in 1872 during the British Raj, contains a set of rules and related provisions governing the admissibility of evidence in Indian courts of law.

The India Evidence Act was replaced by the Bharatiya Sakshya Adhiniyam on 1 July 2024.

== Importance ==
The enactment and adoption of the Indian Evidence Act was a significant development in India, transforming the system of rules regarding the admissibility of evidence in Indian courts of law. Until then, the rules of evidence were based on the traditional legal systems of different social groups and communities of India and were different for different people depending on caste, community, faith and social position. The Indian Evidence Act introduced a standard set of law applicable to all Indians.

The law is mainly based upon the firm work by Sir James Fitzjames Stephen, who could be called the founding father of this comprehensive piece of legislation.

In some Islamic-majority legal systems, such as Palestinian law and Iranian law, commercial law still well into the 21st century, relies heavily on testimonial evidence or customary law, rather than documentary evidence.

== Act ==
The Indian Evidence Act (Act no. 1 of 1872), has eleven chapters and 167 sections, and came into force on 1 September 1872. At the time of its enactment, India was a part of the British Empire. Over more than 150 years since its enactment, the Indian Evidence Act has largely retained its original form, with only certain amendments made from time to time.

Amendments:

The Criminal Law Amendment Act, 2005

The Criminal Law (Amendment) Act, 2018 (22 of 2018)

The Jammu & Kashmir Reorganization Act, 2019

== Applicability ==
When India gained independence on 15 August 1947, the Act continued to be in force throughout the Republic of India and Pakistan. Since the independence of Bangladesh on 26 March 1971, the Indian Evidence Act has been in use throughout the country, though some necessary amendments have been made. After 1947, the Act continued to be in force in India until its replacement in 2024. The Act was repealed in Pakistan in 1984 by the Evidence Order 1984 (also known as the "Qanun-e-Shahadat"). It was applicable to all judicial proceedings in the court, including the court martial. However, it did not apply to affidavits and arbitration.

== Contents ==
This Act is divided into three parts and has 11 chapters.

Part 1

Part 1 deals with relevancy of the facts. There are two chapters under this part: chapter 1 is a preliminary chapter and introduces to Evidence Act and chapter 2 specifically deals with the relevancy of the facts.

Part 2

Part 2 consists of chapters from 3 to 6. Chapter 3 deals with facts which need not be proved, chapter 4 deals with oral evidence, chapter 5 deals with documentary evidence and chapter 6 deals with circumstances when documentary evidence has been given preference over the oral evidence.

Part 3

The last part, that is part 3, consists of chapter 7 to chapter 11. Chapter 7 4 deals with the burden of proof, chapter 8 deals with estoppel, chapter 9 deals with witnesses, chapter 10 deals with the examination of witnesses and chapter 11 deals with the improper admission and rejection of evidence.

== Classic classification ==
In the Evidence Act, all provisions may be divided into two categories: (1) taking the evidence by the court (2) evaluation

Parties to a proceeding before a court of law may adduce only admissible evidence. Admissible evidence is either "fact in issue" or "relevant facts" which are not excluded from being adduced by any other provisions of Indian Evidence Act, 1872. Section 3 of the Act define facts, facts in issue and relevant facts.

According to section 59 and 60, facts can be proved in two ways, orally or by documentary evidence (includes electronic documents). Oral evidence suggests mostly verbal depositions before the Court (and not otherwise) and includes oral statement regarding materials as well. Documentary evidence suggests documents. Evidence regarding matters has a number of facts, for which evidence by way of oral or documentary produced before the court for its evaluation for either one fact or facts.

By looking into the oral and documentary evidence, courts decide whether a particular fact is proved or not. In evaluation, there are two concepts to prove facts: proved (proved, disproved or not proved) and presumption (that fact is proved) (may Presume, Shall presume and Conclusive proof). After going through oral and documentary evidence, court see that whether a fact or facts are proved by looking to such evidence. If not enough or no evidence is given, the said fact is not proved.

The second concept for evaluation is presumption. In evidence, many sections suggest presumption, and courts 'may presume' facts and are extremely free to believe them or not and to ask to prove them. According to section 4, 'shall presume' means that courts have no discretion and must consider the fact as proved unless it is disproved. Where in any provision it is said that a particular fact, sometimes in particular circumstances, must be concluded as "conclusive proof", courts must regard it as proved and may not allow parties to adduce evidence to rebut it.

== Classification in four questions ==
The Evidence Act may be divided in four questions.

Question 1 What is evidence given of?

Answer 1 Evidence is given of "facts in issue" or "relevant facts".

Question 2 How is evidence of such facts given?

Answer 2 Evidence of such facts is given by way of "oral evidence" or "documentary evidence".

Question 3 On whom does the burden of proof lie?

Answer 3 The burden of proof of particular facts or the onus of proof to prove the whole case lies on the prosecution in charge.

Question 4 What is the evaluation of the facts?

Answer 4 The evaluation is "proved " or "presumed", and the fact is "proved", "disproved", or "not proved", or the proof of facts "may presume", "shall presume" or has "conclusive proof" bt the courts.
