= Criminal Law (Amendment) Act, 2013 =

Indian legislation

Parliament of India
- Long title: An Act further to amend the Indian Penal Code, the Code of Criminal Procedure, 1973, the Indian Evidence Act, 1872 and the Protection of Children from Sexual Offences Act, 2012.
- Citation: Act No. 13 of 2013
- Territorial extent: India
- Passed by: Lok Sabha
- Passed: 19 March 2013
- Passed by: Rajya Sabha
- Passed: 21 March 2013
- Assented to: 2 April 2013
- Commenced: 3 April 2013
- Status: In force

The Criminal Law (Amendment) Act, 2013 (popularly known as Nirbhaya Act) is an Indian legislation passed by the Lok Sabha on 19 March 2013, and by the Rajya Sabha on 21 March 2013, which provides for amendment of provisions of the Indian Penal Code, Indian Evidence Act, and Code of Criminal Procedure, 1973 related to sexual offences. The Bill received Presidential assent on 2 April 2013 and was deemed to be effective from 3 February 2013. It was originally an Ordinance promulgated by the President of India, Pranab Mukherjee, on 3 February 2013, in light of the protests in the 2012 Delhi gang rape case.

== Background ==
On 16 December 2012 a female physiotherapy intern was beaten and gang raped in Delhi. She died from her injuries thirteen days later, despite receiving treatment in India and Singapore. The incident generated international coverage and was condemned by the United Nations Entity for Gender Equality and the Empowerment of Women, who called on the Government of India and the Government of Delhi "to do everything in their power to take up radical reforms, ensure justice and reach out with robust public services to make women’s lives more safe and secure". Public protests took place in Delhi, where thousands of protesters clashed with security forces. Similar protests took place in major cities throughout the country.

Six days after the incident, on 22 December 2012, the central government appointed a judicial committee headed by J. S. Verma, a former Judge of Supreme Court, to suggest amendments to criminal law to sternly deal with sexual assault cases. The committee, which also included retired judge Leila Seth and leading advocate Gopal Subramaniam, was given a month to submit its report. The Committee submitted its report within 29 days, on 23 January 2013, supposedly after considering the 80,000 suggestions and petitions received by them during that same period from the public in general and particularly from jurists, lawyers, NGOs and women's groups. The report indicated that failures on the part of the Government and Police were the root cause behind crimes against women. Major suggestions of the report included the need to review AFSPA in conflict areas, maximum punishment for rape as life imprisonment and not death penalty, clear ambiguity over control of Delhi Police etc.

The Cabinet Ministers on 1 February 2013 approved for bringing an ordinance, for giving effect to the changes in law as suggested by the Verma Committee Report. According to former Minister of Law and Justice, Ashwani Kumar, 90 percent of the suggestions given by the Verma Committee Report have been incorporated into the Ordinance. The ordinance was subsequently replaced by a Bill with numerous changes, which was passed by the Lok Sabha on 19 March 2013.

== The Criminal Law (Amendment) Ordinance, 2013 ==
=== New offences ===
This new Act has expressly recognised certain acts as offences which were dealt under related laws. These new offences like, acid attack, sexual harassment, voyeurism, stalking have been incorporated into the Indian Penal Code:

Section	Offence	Punishment	Notes
326A	Acid attack	Imprisonment not less than ten years but which may extend to imprisonment for life and with fine which shall be just and reasonable to meet the medical expenses and it shall be paid to the victim	Gender neutral
326B	Attempt to Acid attack	Imprisonment not less than five years but which may extend to seven years, and shall also be liable to fine	Gender neutral
354A	Sexual harassment	Rigorous imprisonment up to three years, or with fine, or with both in case of offence described in clauses (i), (ii) or (iii) Imprisonment up to one year, or with fine, or with both in other cases	Only protects women. Provisions are: 1. physical contact and advances involving unwelcome and explicit sexual overtures; or 2. a demand or request for sexual favours; or 3. forcibly showing pornographys; or 4. making sexually coloured remark; or 5. any other unwelcome physical, verbal or non-verbal conduct of sexual nature.
354B	Act with intent to disrobe a woman	Imprisonment not less than three years but which may extend to seven years and with fine.	Only protects women against anyone who "Assaults or uses criminal force to any woman or abets such act with the intention of disrobing or compelling her to be naked."
354C	Voyeurism	In case of first conviction, imprisonment not less than one year, but which may extend to three years, and shall also be liable to fine, and be punished on a second or subsequent conviction, with imprisonment of either description for a term which shall not be less than three years, but which may extend to seven years, and shall also be liable to fine.	Only protects women. The prohibited action is defines thus: "Watching or capturing a woman in “private act”, which includes an act of watching carried out in a place which, in the circumstances, would reasonably be expected to provide privacy, and where the victim's genitals, buttocks or breasts are exposed or covered only in underwear; or the victim is using a lavatory; or the person is doing a sexual act that is not of a kind ordinarily done in public."
354D	Stalking	Imprisonment not less than one year but which may extend to three years, and shall also be liable to fine	Only protects women from being stalked by men. The prohibited action is defined thus: "To follow a woman and contact, or attempt to contact such woman to foster personal interaction repeatedly despite a clear indication of disinterest by such woman; or monitor the use by a woman of the internet, email or any other form of electronic communication. There are exceptions to this section which include such act being in course of preventing or detecting a crime authorised by State or in compliance of certain law or was reasonable and justified."

=== Changes in law ===
Section 370 of Indian Penal Code (IPC) has been substituted with new sections, 370 and 370A which deals with trafficking of person for exploitation. If a person (a) recruits, (b) transports, (c) harbours, (d) transfers, or (e) receives, a person, by using threats, or force, or coercion, or abduction, or fraud, or deception, or by abuse of power, or inducement for exploitation including prostitution, slavery, forced organ removal, etc. will be punished with imprisonment ranging from at least 7 years to imprisonment for the remainder of that person's natural life depending on the number or category of persons trafficked. Employment of a trafficked person will attract penal provision as well.

The most important change that has been made is the change in definition of rape under IPC. Although the Ordinance sought to change the word rape to sexual assault, in the Act the word 'rape' has been retained in Section 375, and was extended to include acts in addition to vaginal penetration. The definition is broadly worded with acts like penetration of penis into the vagina, urethra, anus or mouth; or any object or any part of body to any extent, into the vagina, urethra or anus of another woman or making another person do so; to apply mouth or touching private parts constitutes the offence of sexual assault. The section has also clarified that penetration means "penetration to any extent", and lack of physical resistance is immaterial for constituting an offence. Except in certain aggravated situations the punishment will be imprisonment not less than seven years but which may extend to imprisonment for life, and shall also be liable to fine. In aggravated situations, punishment will be rigorous imprisonment for a term which shall not be less than ten years but which may extend to imprisonment for life, and shall also be liable to fine.

A new section, 376A has been added which states that if a person committing the offence of sexual assault, "inflicts an injury which causes the death of the person or causes the person to be in a persistent vegetative state, shall be punished with rigorous imprisonment for a term which shall not be less than twenty years, but which may extend to imprisonment for life, which shall mean the remainder of that person’s natural life, or with death." In case of "gang rape", persons involved regardless of their gender shall be punished with rigorous imprisonment for a term which shall not be less than twenty years, but which may extend to life and shall pay compensation to the victim which shall be reasonable to meet the medical expenses and rehabilitation of the victim. The age of consent in India has been increased to 18 years, which means any sexual activity irrespective of presence of consent with a woman below the age of 18 will constitute statutory rape.

Certain changes has been introduced in the CrPC and Evidence Act, like the process of recording the statement of the victim has been made more victim friendly and easy but the two critical changes are: 1. the 'character of the victim' is now rendered totally irrelevant, and 2. there is now a presumption of 'no consent' in a case where sexual intercourse is proved and the victim states in the court that she did not consent.

=== Criticisms ===
The law has been severely criticized for being gender biased and giving women the legal authority to commit exactly the same crimes (against which they seek protection) against men with impunity. The Criminal Law (Amendment) Ordinance, 2013 has been strongly criticised by several human rights and women's rights organisations for not including certain suggestions recommended by the Verma Committee Report like, marital rape, reduction of age of consent, amending Armed Forces (Special Powers) Act so that no sanction is needed for prosecuting an armed force personnel accused of a crime against woman. The committee also expressed disapproval of castration of sex offenders on the grounds of being unconstitutional and violation of basic human rights, while noting that chemical castration fails to treat the social foundations of rape and that surgical castration constitutes mutilation which is not permitted by the constitution. The Government of India, replied that it has not rejected the suggestions fully, but changes can be made after proper discussion.

The Amendment, while stating that registration of FIR's and reports is mandatory, does not serve any effect on law enforcement, especially state police forces, as there are cases where police officers ignore and refuse to file reports and starting investigations, while allowing them to indulge in moral policing and victim blaming. In such cases, crucial evidence is lost, which results in botched up investigations, as well as acquittals, or convictions not on the offenses of rape, besides enhancing confidence or rapists getting away with their crime. Furthermore, in some cases, police officials do not investigate or take action in-time citing jurisdiction, or dismissing incidents that have not happened yet. Complicating such investigations is an old fashioned Police Act of 1861, which several states continue to use as policing becomes a state issue as per the Constitution of India, and mandatory overtime work for police personnel, especially the constable ranks. In instances where the victims belong to the marginalized communities, like Dalit or Muslim, or where the culprits belong to the political elite or privileged class, the victims face humiliations at the hands of police officers as well as being put in lock-ups under false cases. The Uttar Pradesh Police has been infamous in handling such cases, especially when it required intervention of the Allahabad High Court and the Supreme Court of India, like the 2017 Unnao rape case and the 2020 Hathras gang rape and murder. In several cases, the Central Bureau of Investigation have taken over such investigations following State Government or court orders.

The Amendment also fails to mandate keeping rape victims and key witnesses under protection, with the exception of Delhi Police and Delhi State Government. Due to the non-provision of witness protection, rape victims and witnesses have been attacked and murdered by the family or kin of the perpetrators, as well as by the perpetrators themselves if granted bail or parole. While the amendment mentions not granting bail or parole to rape convicts, there have been instances where high profile rape convicts, such as Gurmeet Ram Rahim Singh have been granted parole, despite objections and criticism. The amendment, which also does not grant remissions to rape convicts serving life imprisonment, has not worked for cases which are disposed before the amendment was enacted and enforced - in the 2002 Bilkis Bano case which took place during the 2002 Gujarat riots, the rape convicts were erroneously granted parole several times and remission on 15 August 2022, where they threatened the victims and witnesses. The remission was however, overturned by the Supreme Court on 8 January 2024, noting several frauds committed by the convicts requesting remission, as well as mentioning the observations from the CBI, the magistrate and Superintendent of Police of Dahod, Gujarat.

The Amendment has been termed as an eyewash by several women safety activists, as it neither served any deterrence for crimes against women including rape, nor it solved the core problems of women's safety. Despite the Justice Verma Commission's recommendations of not having capital punishment as there was considerable evidence that it did not serve as a deterrence, the amendment still mandated death penalty in cases of repeat offenses, death of the victim, or if the victim is left in vegetative state, or for minor victims below the age of 12. Additionally, the amendment does not change the general attitudes towards victims, as many view that women are to be blamed for rape, when in fact, the culprits are to be held responsible. Furthermore, the changes in the law does nothing with regards to judicial competencies, especially when judges make decisions that deny justice to the victims, despite evidence. For such decisions, criticism of the judiciary is considered as contempt of court, due to an aristocratic mindset and superiority of judges, that has been in carried forward after Independence.

The Amendment recommended imparting of sex education for children, as well as adult literacy programs for gender empowerment. However, sex education has been opposed by several political leaders and activists, as well as right wing organizations, stating that sex education does not fit in Indian cultural norms, and that it will corrupt the mindsets of school children.

== The Criminal Law (Amendment) Act, 2013 ==
The Bill was passed by the Lok Sabha on 19 March 2013, and by the Rajya Sabha on 21 March 2013, making certain changes from the provisions in the Ordinance. The Bill received Presidential assent on 2 April 2013 and came into force retrospectively from 3 February 2013. The changes made in the Act in comparison with the Ordinance is listed as follows:

Offence	Changes
Acid attack	Fine shall be just and reasonable to meet medical expenses for treatment of victim, while in the Ordinance it was fine up to Rupees 10 lakhs.
Sexual harassment	"Clause (v) any other unwelcome physical, verbal or non-verbal conduct of sexual nature" has been removed. Punishment for offence under clause (i) and (ii) has been reduced from five years of imprisonment to three years. The offence is no longer gender-neutral, only a man can commit the offence on a woman.
Voyeurism	The offence is no longer gender-neutral, only a man can commit the offence on a woman.
Stalking	The offence is no longer gender-neutral, only a man can commit the offence on a woman. The definition has been reworded and broken down into clauses, The exclusion clause and the following sentence has been removed "or watches or spies on a person in a manner that results in a fear of violence or serious alarm or distress in the mind of such person, or interferes with the mental peace of such person, commits the offence of stalking". Punishment for the offence has been changed; A man committing the offence of stalking would be liable for imprisonment up to three years for the first offence, and shall also be liable to fine and for any subsequent conviction would be liable for imprisonment up to five years and with fine.
Trafficking of person	"Prostitution" has been removed from the explanation clause
