= Pioneering (scouting) =

Structural art using ropes and wooden spars

A decorative camp gateway

Pioneering is the art of using ropes and wooden spars joined by lashings and knots to create a structure. Pioneering can be used for constructing small items such as camp gadgets up to larger structures such as bridges and towers. These may be recreational, decorative, or functional.

Pioneering is used to teach practical skills, teamwork and problem solving. It is widely used in Scouting and Girl Guiding. Many Scout and Guide groups train their members in pioneering skills and construct projects, both small and large. In camp, they may construct functional items like tables, camp dressers and gadgets, as well as decorative camp gateways. Pioneering is a common merit badge in many countries, and was required for the Eagle Scout rank in the 1920s and 1930s.

The name comes from the 18th and 19th century military engineers who went ahead of an army to "pioneer" a route, which could involve building bridges and towers with rope and timber (for example the Royal Pioneer Corps).

Pioneering skills include knot tying (tying ropes together), lashing (tying spars together with rope), whipping (binding the end of a rope with thin twine), splicing (joining or binding the end of a rope using its own fibres), and skills related to the use, care and storage of ropes, spars and related pioneering equipment.

== History ==
Pioneering was introduced into Scouting by Lord Robert Baden-Powell, who was influenced by the Sons of Daniel Boone. Daniel Beard, the founder of the Sons of Daniel Boone, founded his organization to keep the pioneer spirit alive after the closing of the American frontier in 1890. Daniel Beard later became a founding member of the Boy Scouts of America upon its inception in 1910. Baden-Powell kept the pioneer spirit teachings of the Sons of Daniel Boone as a way to instill structure and honor the tradition of the American frontier.

=== Girl Scouts and Girl Guides in Pioneering ===
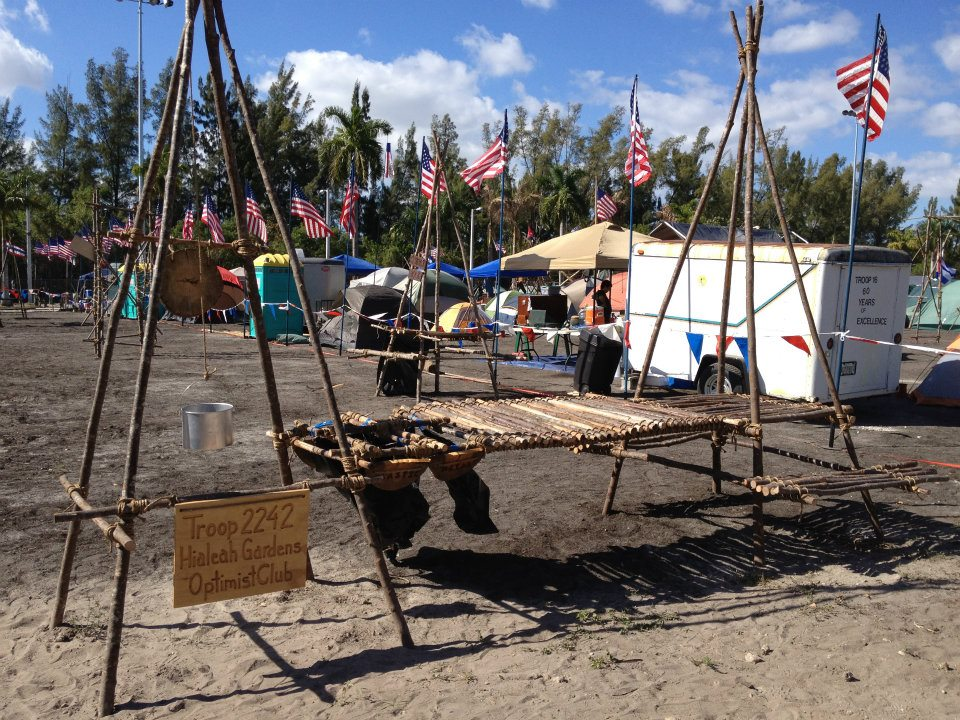
Multi-use table built by Girl Scouts using two quad pods, cross bracing and staves attached with floor lashings.

Both the Girl Guides Association in England and the Girl Scouts of America similarly adopted pioneering as a skill-building activity in their program upon its inception. The Girl Guides Association in England was founded in 1910 after Robert Baden-Powell asked his sister, Agnes Baden-Powell, for help starting an organization similar to his Boy Scouts, for girls. In the same spirit, Juliette Gordon Low, a friend of the Baden-Powell's, founded the Girl Scouts of America shortly thereafter in 1912. Both of these programs, modeled after the original spirit of the Boy Scouts of America, adopted its emphasis on pioneering as well.

== Miniature pioneering ==
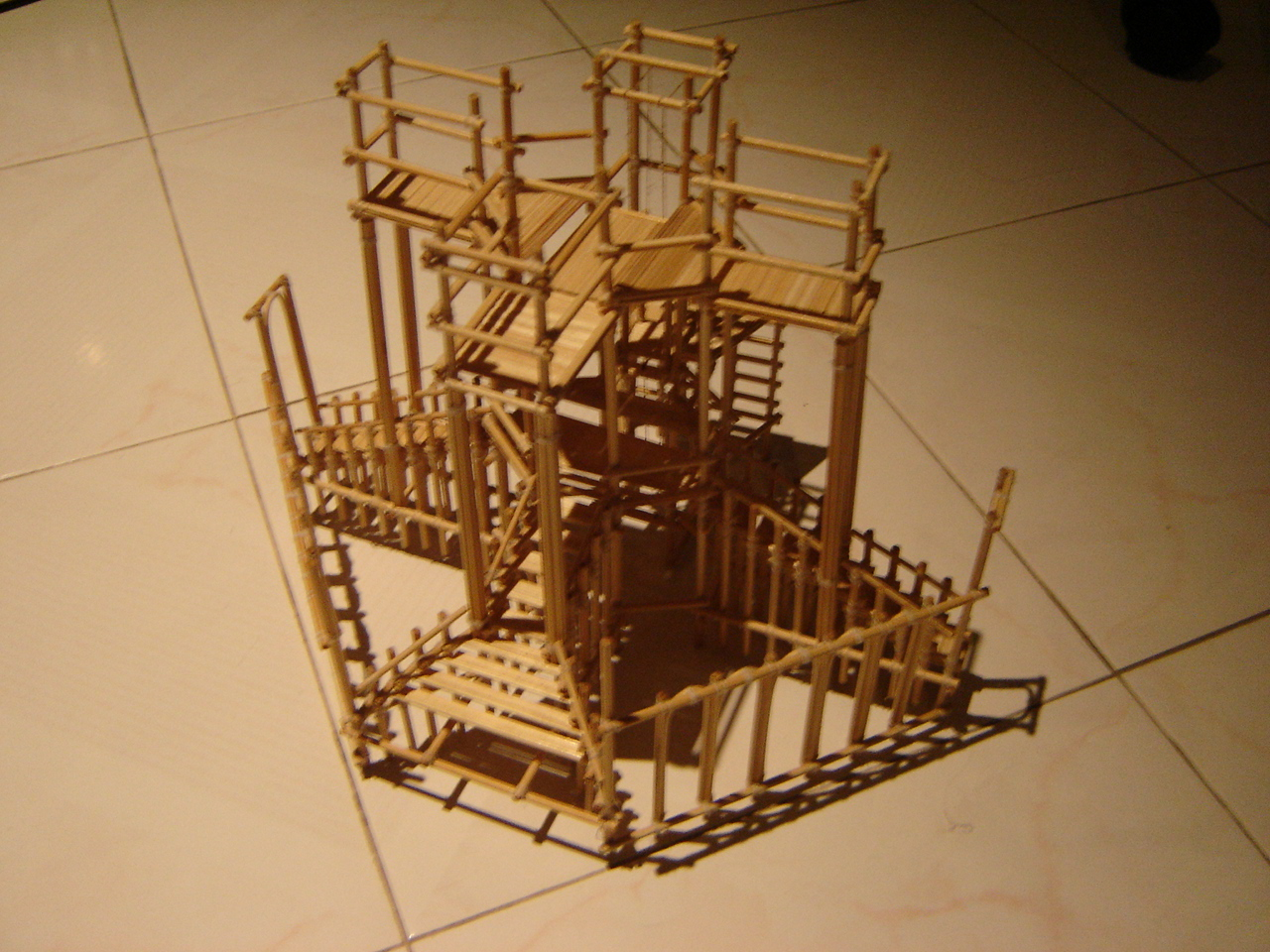
2003 Atlantis Tower

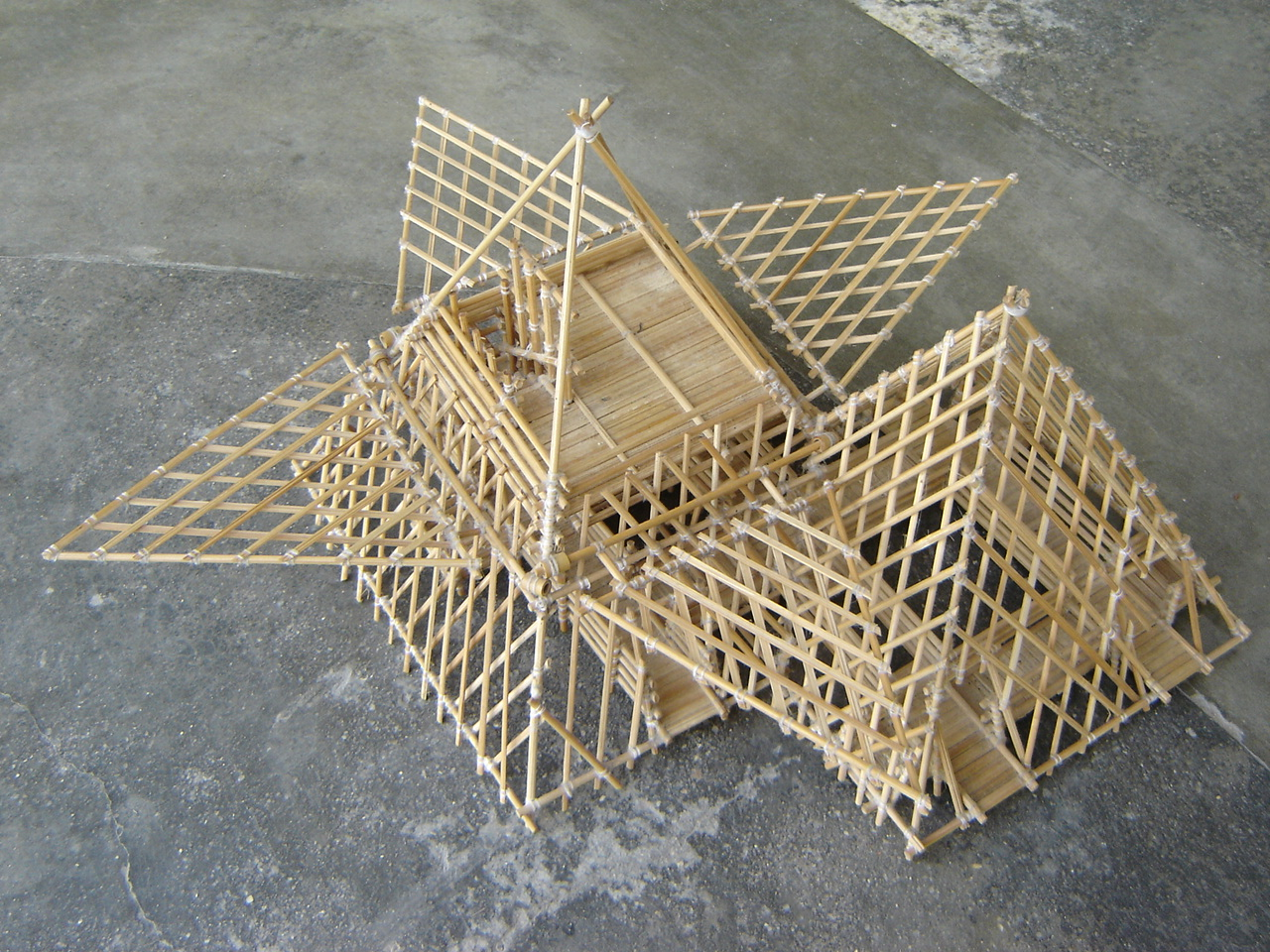
2001 Pyramids

Miniature pioneering or model pioneering is an art form featuring the miniaturized version of pioneering construction. This technique was originally used by Boy Scouts to create a model for campsite planning. Models are a convenient way to plan a construction project, requiring the same techniques as a full-scale model, and allowing for accurate equipment lists to be developed, as well as for difficulties in sequencing construction to be identified. However, scout troops in Malaysia are innovating it into a new form of art through competitions. While real pioneering is a combination of wooden spars and ropes, these materials are replaced by wooden sticks and white thread in Miniature Pioneering. Projects on a smaller scale using garden canes, staves, bamboo rods, or elastic bands may also be constructed at troop meetings. Another application of pioneering techniques is the manufacture of camp gadgets.

Although design and complexity plays a major part in judging the value of a model, lashing quality plays a major role whereby it is evaluated based on the three criteria of tightness, tidiness, and cleanliness. Similar to all handmade models, the activity of making a miniature pioneering model is good training for patience and perfection.

== Basic knots ==
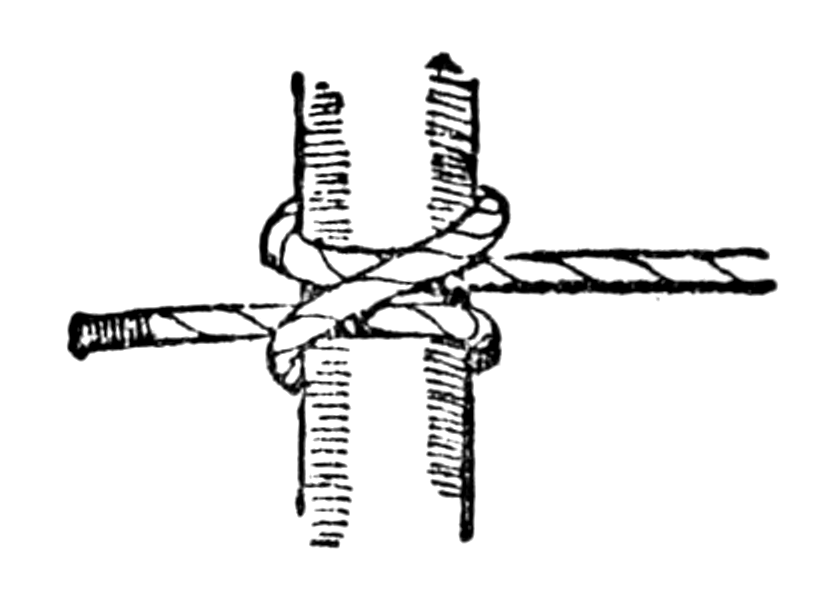
Clove hitch knot

There are a number of basic knots used in pioneering:

- Bowline
- Clove hitch
- Reef knot
- Sheet bend
- Timber hitch
- Common whipping

There are also a number of specialized pioneering knots that are used to add safety and functionality to pioneering projects:

- Butterfly Loop
- Carrick Bend
- Rolling hitch
- Roundturn and Two Half Hitches

== Basic lashings ==
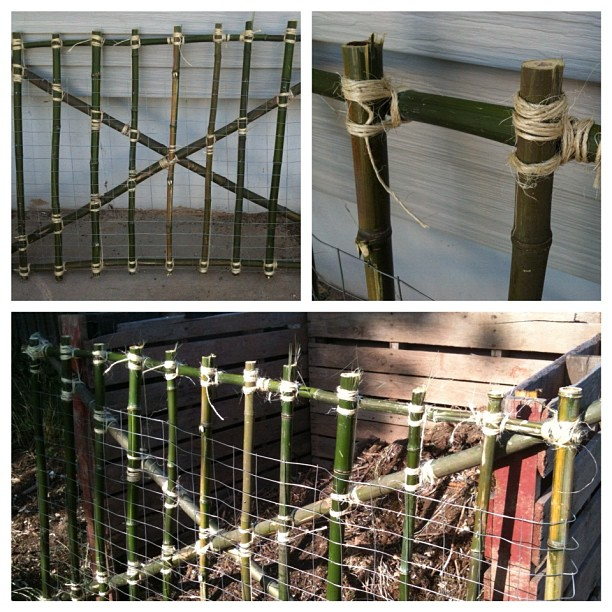
A compost pile fence assembled using square lashings

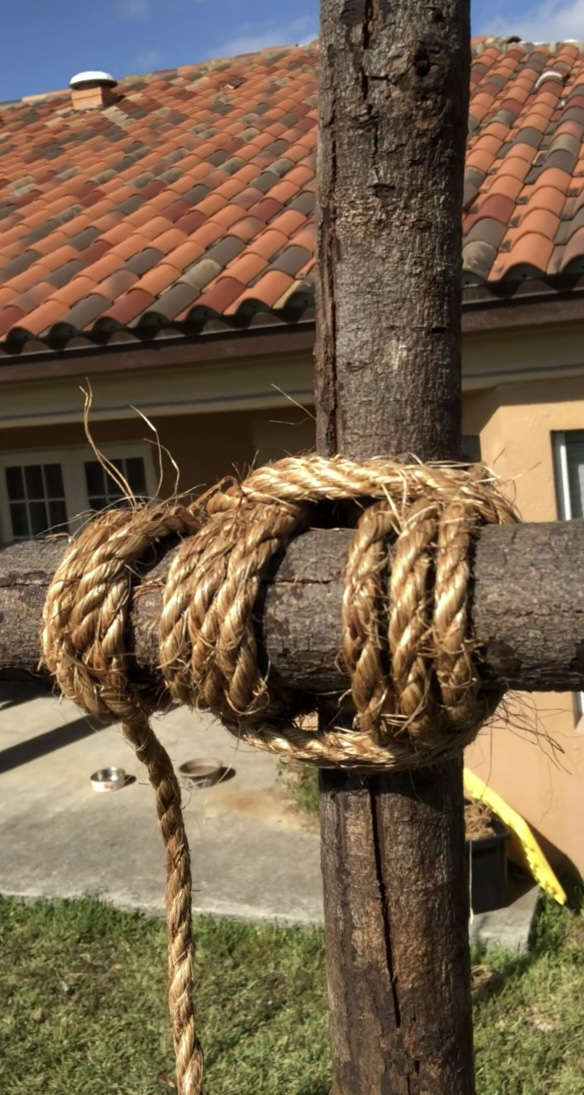
Square lashing binding two poles crossing at 90 degrees

Pioneering uses these basic lashings as a foundation upon which to build. Using these key lashings, countless pioneering projects can be created.

  - Square lashing: Bind poles that cross each other at any angle from 45° to 90°
  - Diagonal lashing: Secures two poles together at the point in which they cross, but are not initially touching
  - Round lashing: Used to join two poles together to extend their length
  - Sheer lashing: (also spelled Shear Lashing) Joins two poles in a scissors shape, to be spread out, most often to form the legs of an A-frame
  - Floor lashing: Secures poles lying down in a straight line to form a deck or a "floor"
  - Tripod lashing: (also known as a Figure of Eight Lashing) Is used to connect three or more spars together to form a self standing structure such as a tripod or quadpod.

== Pioneering structures ==
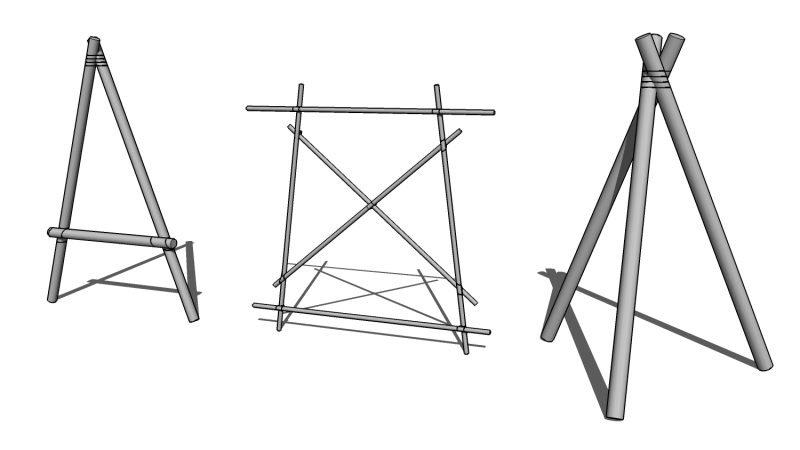
Basic Pioneering structures: (L to R) The A-frame, Trestle and Tripod

These basic structures are the building blocks for a number of pioneering projects:

  - A-Frame: Forms the basis of many tower structures. A-frames are constructed using a round lashing for the two poles forming the "A" and a horizontal pole across to maintain stability. The horizontal pole of the A-frame also makes a convenient springing point for a deck to form a table-top. Tied using either diagonal or square lashings.
  - Trestle: Forms the modular element for building bridges and towers. Also used as a 'chariot' for inter-patrol Boy Scout chariot races. Tied using diagonal and/or square lashings.
  - Tripod: Forms a sturdy and versatile base for pioneering projects. To secure the structure, cross braces are usually attached to the legs of the tripods. Tied using a tripod lashing.
  - Quadpod (colloquial): Forms a sturdy base upon which to build. A tripod with four legs. Tied using a figure of eight lashing- a tripod lashing, but with an extra pole.

== Pioneering projects ==
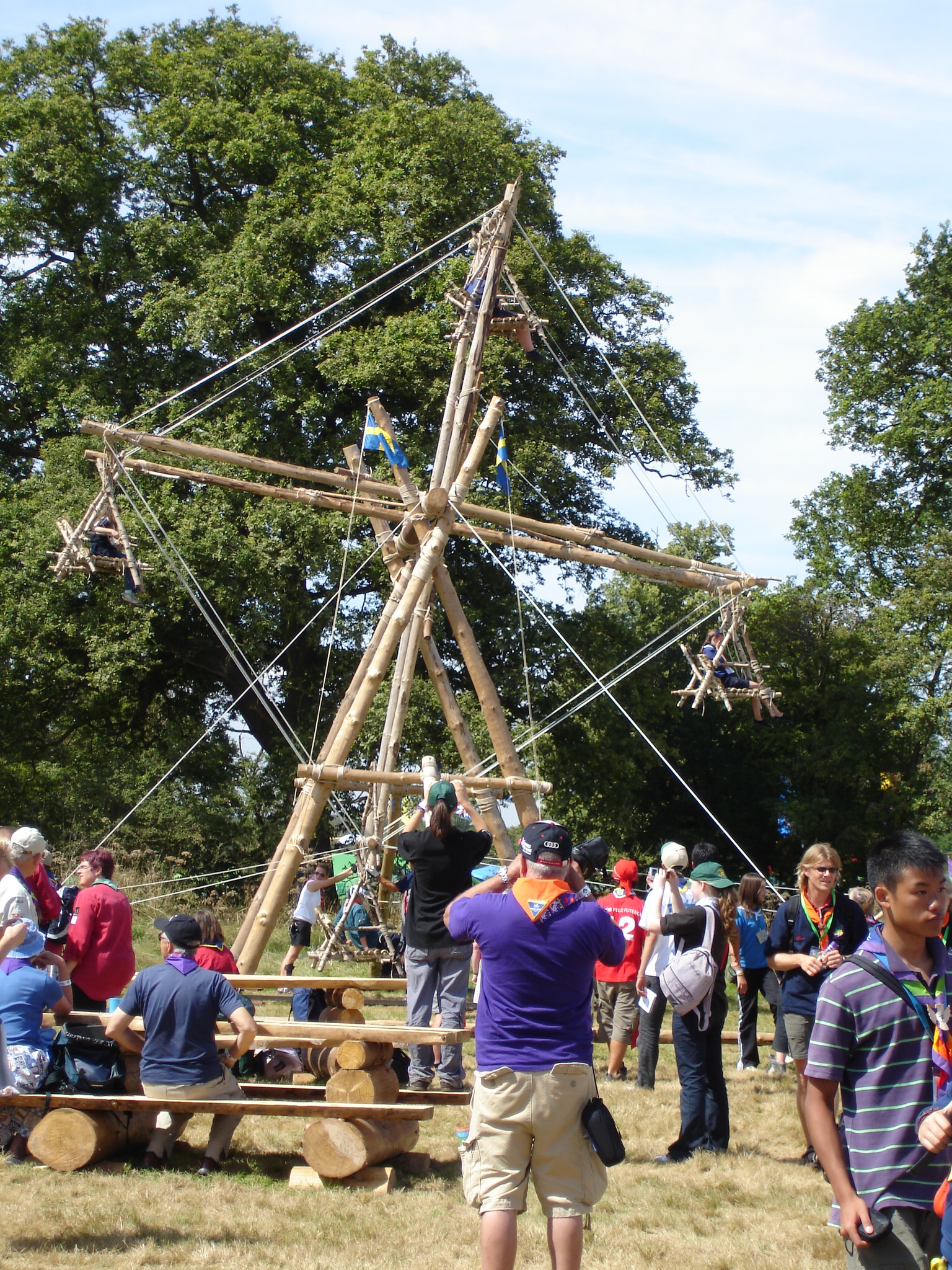
A ferris wheel constructed by Swedish Scouts

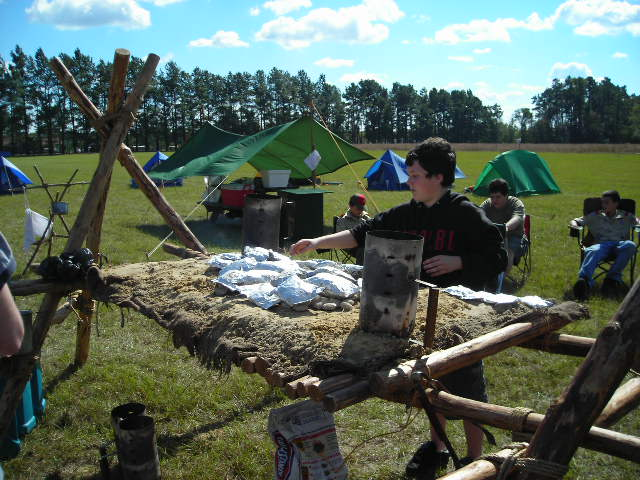
A Boy Scout foil cooks his patrol's lunch on a Double Tripod Chippewa Kitchen.

- Aerial runways
- Ballistae
- Benches
- Bridges
- Camp gadgets
- Camp gateways
- Catapults
- Chairs
- Chippewa Kitchens
- Dressers
- Entrance Ways
- Flagpoles
- Fences
- Ferris Wheels
- Merry-Go-Rounds
- Rafts
- See Saws
- Swing Sets
- Swinging Ships
- Tables
- Towers
- Trebuchets

== See also ==
- List of knots
- Miniature pioneering
- Woodcraft
