= Behnken =

Behnken is a German patronymic surname derived from the given name Behn, a short form of the name Bernhard. Notable people with the surname include:

- Bob Behnken (born 1970), American astronaut and engineer
- John William Behnken (1884–1968), American church leader
- Linda Behnken, American commercial fisher

== See also ==
- Benken (disambiguation)
- Benkin
