= Magistrate courts in Bangladesh =

Magistrate Court
- Government Seal of Bangladesh

Magistrate Court is a criminal court located in the districts and metropolitan areas of Bangladesh. At the district level, the court is referred to as Magistrate Court, which includes the courts of the Chief Judicial Magistrate, Additional Chief Judicial Magistrate, Senior Judicial Magistrate, and Judicial Magistrate. On the other hand, in metropolitan areas, the courts of the Chief Metropolitan Magistrate, Additional Chief Metropolitan Magistrate, and Metropolitan Magistrate are collectively referred to as Magistrate Courts. According to section 4(k) of the amended Criminal Procedure Code of 2007, the term magistrate refers specifically to a Judicial Magistrate.

The Chief Judicial Magistrate is the head of the Magistrate Court in the district. The Additional Chief Judicial Magistrate is the second-in-command at the Magistrate Court. Additionally, one or more Senior Judicial Magistrates and Judicial Magistrates serve as presiding officers of various magistrate courts at the sub-district level. The different levels of magistrates in the district Magistrate Court are:

- Chief Judicial Magistrate
- Additional Chief Judicial Magistrate
- Senior Judicial Magistrate / First Class Magistrate
- Judicial Magistrate

On the other hand, the Chief Metropolitan Magistrate is the chief magistrate of the Magistrate Court in the metropolitan area. The Additional Chief Metropolitan Magistrate is the second highest officer in the metropolitan magistrate court. Meanwhile, Metropolitan Magistrates perform duties in various magistrate courts. The different levels of magistrates in the metropolitan magistrate court are:

- Chief Metropolitan Magistrate
- Additional Chief Metropolitan Magistrate
- Metropolitan Magistrate / First Class Magistrate

== Rank ==
According to the Warrant of Precedence, the rank of Chief Judicial Magistrate and Chief Metropolitan Magistrate is at 20, the rank of Additional Chief Judicial Magistrate and Additional Chief Metropolitan Magistrate is at 22, and the rank of Senior Judicial Magistrate and Metropolitan Magistrate is at 25. It is noteworthy that among the notable senior officials of districts and metropolitan areas, the rank of District and Sessions Judge/Metropolitan Sessions Judge is at 17, the rank of Additional District and Sessions Judge/Additional Metropolitan Sessions Judge is at 20 along with the rank of Divisional Commissioner, Joint District and Sessions Judge/Joint Metropolitan Sessions Judge is at 22, the rank of Deputy Inspector General (DIG) is at 21, the rank of Additional Divisional Commissioner is at 23, the rank of District Commissioner (DC)/Assistant Inspector General of Police is at 24, and the rank of Senior Judicial Magistrate/Senior Assistant Judge/Deputy Superintendent of Police (DSP)/Sub-district Executive Officer (UNO) is at 25.

== Jurisdiction ==
The Chief Judicial Magistrate/Chief Metropolitan Magistrate may take cognizance of any offense committed within their jurisdiction as per section 190(1) of the Code of Criminal Procedure. When the officer-in-charge (O.C.) of the police station receives information about a cognizable offense, they record it as an FIR (First Information Report). If the offense is non-cognizable, a General Diary (GD) is filed, and if permitted by the relevant First Class Magistrate, the police may conduct an investigation. Conversely, if someone brings a direct complaint to the court, and it is of a serious nature, the magistrate may direct the officer-in-charge of the police station to register it as an FIR according to section 156(3) of the Code of Criminal Procedure. The magistrate can examine the complainant and take cognizance of the offense under section 200 or direct the police or any other person to conduct an investigation under section 202. Upon receiving the report, the magistrate may take cognizance of the offense under the relevant section.

== Powers and authority ==
The Chief Judicial Magistrate and Chief Metropolitan Magistrate can impose a maximum sentence of 7 years of imprisonment. According to Section 29(g) of the Code of Criminal Procedure, the government may empower the Chief Judicial Magistrate/Chief Metropolitan Magistrate to try all offenses except for the death penalty in consultation with the High Court Division. It is mentioned in section 33(a) of the law that under the authority of section 29(g), the Chief Judicial Magistrate and Chief Metropolitan Magistrate may impose any sentence authorized by law, excluding the death penalty or life imprisonment or imprisonment exceeding 7 years. The Additional Chief Judicial Magistrate and Additional Chief Metropolitan Magistrate have the same sentencing powers as the Chief Judicial Magistrate and Chief Metropolitan Magistrate, meaning they too can impose a maximum sentence of 7 years. Senior Judicial Magistrates and Metropolitan Magistrates can issue sentences up to 5 years. Judicial Magistrates can impose sentences of up to 3 years. On the other hand, executive magistrates, including the Deputy Commissioner, cannot impose sentences exceeding 2 years.

== Remand ==
According to Article 33(2) of the Constitution of Bangladesh and section 61 of the Code of Criminal Procedure, the police must present any individual arrested within 24 hours before a First Class Magistrate of the cognizance court. The relevant magistrate may order police remand for questioning of the accused for up to 15 days in the case of serious or unsubstantiated offenses, according to section 167(1) of the Code of Criminal Procedure.

== See also ==
- Magistrate
