= Unlawful assembly =

Legal term for a group of people intending to cause a civil disturbance

Unlawful assembly is a legal term to describe a group of people with the mutual intent of deliberate disturbance of the peace. If the group is about to start an act of disturbance, it is termed a rout; if the disturbance is commenced, it is then termed a riot. In England, the offence was abolished in 1986, but it exists in other countries.

== History ==
A definition of the offence of unlawful assembly appears in the Criminal Code Bill first prepared by Sir James Fitzjames Stephens in 1878 for the UK Parliament. Many jurisdictions have used this bill as a basis for their own codification of the criminal law.

== Australia ==
In Australia, in Victoria it is an offense for a person to participate in an unlawful assembly, or to fail to disperse upon request. The maximum punishment is imprisonment for one year.

== Bangladesh ==
Section 144 is a section of the Code of Criminal Procedure, which prohibits assembly of five or more people, holding of public meetings, and carrying of firearms and can be invoked for up to two months. It also gives the magistracy the power to issue order absolute at once in urgent cases of nuisance or apprehended danger. With the introduction of Dhaka Metropolitan Police (DMP) in 1976, Section 144 has ceased to operate in the metropolitan jurisdiction in Bangladesh.

== Canada ==
Under Part II of the Canadian Criminal Code (Offences Against Public Order),"An unlawful assembly is an assembly of three or more persons who, with intent to carry out any common purpose, assemble in such a manner or so conduct themselves when they are assembled as to cause persons in the neighborhood of the assembly to fear, on reasonable grounds, that they (a) will disturb the peace tumultuously; or (b) will by that assembly needlessly and without reasonable cause provoke other persons to disturb the peace tumultuously."

== England and Wales ==
By the 19th century, unlawful assembly, a term used in English law, described a gathering of three or more people with intent to commit a crime by force, or to carry out a common purpose (whether lawful or unlawful), in such a manner or in such circumstances as would in the opinion of firm and rational men endanger the public peace or create fear of immediate danger to the tranquillity of the neighborhood. A reform commission in 1879 believed that what underlay the first on-point legislation of 1328, (Note: Criminal Code Commission, 1879) outlining when such a crime was recognised nationally (still to adjudged by or via a justice of the peace) was certain landed proprietors at loggerheads employing a band of violent armed retainers, above the traditional manorial bailiffs. (Note: Statute of Northampton, 1328, (2 Edw. 3. c. 3))

In the Year Book, a legal text, of the third year of Henry VII's reign, assemblies were expressed as not punishable unless in terrorem: populi domini regis, a threat to the people, God or the King.

In 1882 it was ruled that, on balance, an unlawful assembly would need to be more than participants knowing beforehand of likely formal opposition and the mere prospect of a breach of the peace; by this date a quiltwork of cases had identified certain rights to orderly, lawful protest. (Note: Beatty v. Gillbanks, 1882, 9 Q. B. D. 308) All people may, and must if called upon to do so, assist in dispersing an unlawful assembly. (Note: Redford v. Birley, 1822, 1 St. Tr. n.s. 1215; R. v. Pinney, 1831, 3 St. Tr. n.s. 11) An assembly which was lawful could not be rendered unlawful by (court) proclamation unless it were one authorized by statute. (Note: R. v. Fursey, 1833, 3 St. Tr. n.s. 543, 567; R. v. O'Connell, 1831, 2 St. Tr. n.s. 629, 656; see also the Prevention of Crimes [Ireland] Act 1887)

Cementing the English Bill of Rights 1689 banning private armies, meetings for training or drilling, or military movements, were from 1820 unlawful assemblies unless held under lawful authority from the Crown, the Lord-lieutenant, or two justices of the peace. (Note: Unlawful Drilling Act 1820, s. 11)

An unlawful assembly which had made a motion towards its common purpose was termed a rout, if it carried out all or part of its end purpose, e.g., beginning to demolish an enclosure, it became a riot. All three offences were misdemeanours in English law, punishable by fine and imprisonment. The first of these three offenses was abolished by the Public Order Act 1986 for two parts of the UK, the most recent major reform of public order offences, the other two parts having similar legislation.

The common law as to unlawful assembly extended to Ireland, subject to special legislation. The law of Scotland included unlawful assembly under the same head as rioting.

== Hong Kong ==
The Public Order Ordinance (chapter 245 of the laws of Hong Kong) defines "unlawful assembly" (§18) as an assembly of three or more people conducting themselves in a "disorderly, intimidating, insulting or provocative manner intended or likely to cause a person reasonably to fear that the people so assembled will conduct a breach of the peace or will by such conduct provoke other persons to commit a breach of the peace". people taking part in unlawful assemblies can be punished with up to five years' imprisonment (if indicted) or a level 2 fine (HK$5000) and imprisonment for three years (on summary conviction).

== India ==
In about 1861, officer Raj-Ratna E. F. Deboo IPS was the designer and architect of section 144, which reduced overall crime in that time in the state of Baroda. He was recognized for his initiative and awarded a gold medal by Maharaja of Baroda for putting Section 144 in place and reducing overall crime. Section 144 of Code of Criminal Procedure (CrPC) has since been replaced by section 163 of the Bharatiya Nagarik Suraksha Sanhita (BNSS, 2023).

Section 163 of the BNSS empowers an executive magistrate to issue orders in urgent cases of nuisance or apprehended danger. Though the scope of Section 163 is wider, it is often used to prohibit assembly of one or more persons when unrest is anticipated. Section 148 of the BNSS grants executive magistrates and police officers in charge of a police station and above the power to order dispersal of, disperse and cause to be dispersed any unlawful assembly. Section 149 authorizes an executive magistrate to obtain the aid of the Armed Forces to disperse any such assembly, and Section 150 grants any gazetted officer of the Armed Forces the power to use his troops to disperse a manifestly dangerous assembly even without command from a magistrate (he must, however, contact an executive magistrate as soon as possible and then follow his instructions while taking any further actions). The law grants authority to issue such orders to the District Magistrate, the Additional District Magistrate, the Sub-divisional Magistrate, and any other Executive Magistrate specially empowered by the State Government.

The definition of 'unlawful assembly', according to Indian law, is laid down in Section 189 of the Bharatiya Nyaya Sanhita (BNS). According to this section, an assembly of five or more persons becomes unlawful when its purpose is or becomes:

1. To overawe by criminal force, or show of criminal force, the Central or any State Government or Parliament or the Legislature of any State, or any public servant in the exercise of the lawful power of such public servant;
2. To resist the execution of any law, or of any legal process;
3. To commit any mischief or criminal trespass, or other offence;
4. By means of criminal force, or show of criminal force, to any person, to take or obtain possession of any property, or to deprive any person of the enjoyment of a right of way, or of the use of water or other incorporeal right of which he is in possession or enjoyment, or to enforce any right or supposed right;
5. By means of criminal force, or show of criminal force, to compel any person to do what he is not legally bound to do, or to omit to do what he is legally entitled to do.

Section 191 defines 'rioting' is defined as the offence every member of an unlawful assembly commits, when that assembly or any member of such assembly uses force or violence in pursuit of their common intent.

According to Sections 189-191 of the BNS, the maximum punishment for engaging in rioting is rigorous imprisonment for 3 years and/or fine. Every member of an unlawful assembly can be held responsible for a crime committed by the group. Obstructing an officer trying to disperse an unlawful assembly may attract further punishment.

== Northern Ireland ==
The offence of unlawful assembly in Northern Ireland applies if a person is a member of an assembly of three or more persons which is either causing a disturbance or giving rise to a reasonable apprehension of a breach of the peace.

== United States ==
In New York State in the United States, a person is guilty of unlawful assembly when he "assembles with four or more other persons for the purpose of engaging or preparing to engage with them in tumultuous and violent conduct likely to cause public alarm, or when, being present at an assembly which either has or develops such purpose, he remains there with intent to advance that purpose."

== See also ==
- Curfew
- Freedom of assembly
