= Metropolitan Magistrate Courts in Bangladesh =

Metropolitan Magistrate Court is special category of magistrate court that exists only in metropolitan areas of Bangladesh. The Code of Criminal Procedure (Amendment) Ordinance, 1976 mandated the government of Bangladesh to establish distinct class of courts exclusively for the metropolitan regions.

Metropolitan Magistrate Court is the second-tier of court which is presided over by Judicial Magistrates. These courts function under the supervision and control of Metropolitan Sessions Courts.

== Classification ==
Metropolitan Magistrate Court has a three tier structure:

- Chief Metropolitan Magistrate Court
- Additional Chief Metropolitan Magistrate Court
- Metropolitan Magistrate Court (1st Class)

Additional Chief Metropolitan Magistrates have all or any of the powers of the Chief Metropolitan Magistrate. Metropolitan Magistrates, also known as 1st class Metropolitan Magistrates are subordinate to the Chief Metropolitan Magistrate.

== Scope of penalty ==
The powers of the Metropolitan Magistrate include imprisonment for a maximum of five years, a solitary confinement is authorized by law, fine not exceeding taka 10,000 and the order of whipping.
