= Salah Choudhury =

Bangladeshi journalist

- সালাহ চৌধুরী
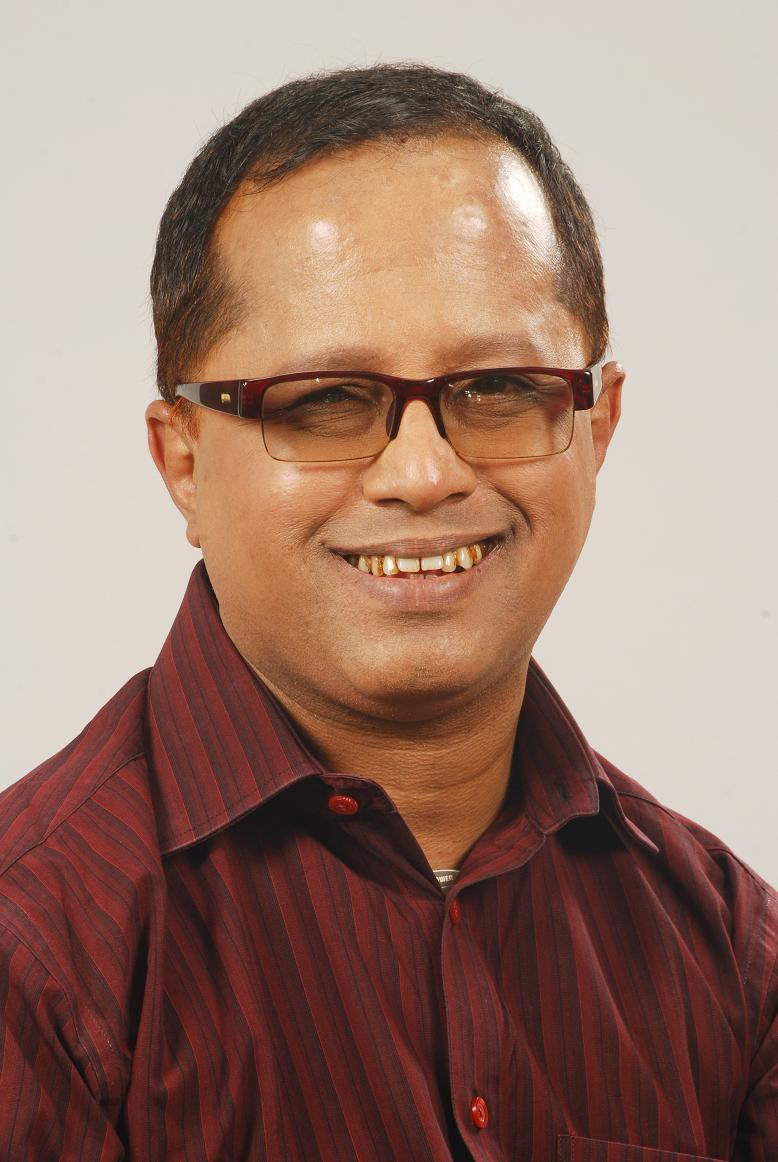
- Choudhury in 2011
- Born: Salah Uddin Shoaib Choudhury; 1965 or 1966 (age 60–61)
- Occupation: Journalist
- Criminal charges: Treason, Sedition and Money Fraud
- Criminal penalty: Imprisonment
- Criminal status: Imprisoned for 7 years, 4 years and for 3 months

Salah Uddin Shoaib Choudhury is a Bangladeshi journalist. He is an editor of the Bangladeshi tabloid Blitz. In 2014, he was convicted of carrying documents provoking interreligious friction, and in 2015 of embezzlement. Fact-checkers have found Choudhury to have posted disinformation on various occasions.

== Career ==
Choudhury is the editor and owner of the English language newspaper Blitz, and editor-in-chief of Bangla weekly Jamjamat. Blitz is a tabloid which has been published every Wednesday since 2003 by Choudhury.

The tabloid states that it watches, investigates, and focuses on Islamist militancy groups; and that it defends religious minority groups in Bangladesh.

According to The Baltimore Examiner Choudhury was a correspondent for the Daily Inqilab, as the mouthpiece of the Jamaat-e-Islami backed by Pakistan.

== Prosecutions and assaults ==
Choudhury was arrested on 29 November 2003 when he tried to attend a seminar in Tel Aviv at the invitation of the International Forum for the Literature and Culture of Peace. He was charged with smuggling country information, sedition, treason, and blasphemy in 2003, and a case was filed against him on 24 January 2004 by Mohammad Abdul Hanif, head of Airport Police Station of Dhaka, who stated that he was a Mossad agent based on the documents found in his possession. Choudhury faced charges of smuggling information out of country, money fraud, sedition, treason, blasphemy, and espionage since January 2004 for attempting to attend a conference of the Hebrew Writers' Association in Tel Aviv. He violated the Passport Act by attempting to travel to Israel in November 2003; the Act forbids citizens from visiting countries with which Bangladesh does not maintain diplomatic relations, and is usually punishable with a fine. On 29 November, he was taken into police custody and allegedly blindfolded, beaten and interrogated for ten days in an attempt to extract a confession that he was an Israeli spy. He spent the next 17 months in solitary confinement and was denied medical treatment for his glaucoma. On the intervention of US Congressman Mark Kirk, who spoke to Bangladesh's ambassador to the US, Choudhury was released on bail, though the charges were not dropped.

In July 2006, the office of Choudhury's newspaper was bombed by Islamist militants.

In October 2006, a mob stormed the Blitz' offices and beat Choudhury, fracturing his ankle. According to Bret Stephens, a columnist for The Wall Street Journal, in September of the same year, despite the government's reluctance to prosecute, a judge with Islamist connections ordered the case to continue because Choudhury had "spoil[ed] the image of Bangladesh" and "hurt the sentiments of Muslims" by lauding Jews and Christians. After the police detail that had been posted to the offices had left, the offices were ransacked and Choudhury was badly beaten by a mob. When he lodged a formal complaint with the police, an arrest warrant was issued for him. The US Embassy in Dhaka sent an observer to his trial.

Choudhury later lodged a case in the Court of Metropolitan Magistrate against his attackers, most of whom were affiliated with the Cultural Wing of the Bangladesh Nationalist Party (BNP).

On 18 March 2008, members of the Rapid Action Battalion (RAB) abducted Choudhury from his office at gunpoint. He was blindfolded and taken to an RAB office before being released. Series of written complaints were sent with the military-controlled interim government on this incident, but action was never taken by the Bangladesh authorities against the RAB. The RAB also found illegal drugs in Mr. Choudhury's desk drawer.

On 22 February 2009, armed men claiming to belong to the Awami League entered Choudhury's office, ransacked it, and physically assaulted him and other members of the Blitz newspaper.

In March 2011, Aryeh Yosef Gallin, the founder and president of the Root and Branch Association (a nonprofit group that promotes cooperation between Israel and other nations), expelled Choudhury from its Islam-Israel Fellowship after reports accused the Bangladeshi of swindling "emotionally vulnerable single Jewish ladies" out of tens of thousands of dollars.

On 7 November 2012, the Dhaka court sentences Choudhury to be imprisoned for four years rigorous in connection to an embezzlement case filed by his business partner Sajjad Hossain, chairman of Bangladesh Center for International Studies. He was convicted in 2015 by the Chief Metropolitan Magistrate court and sentenced to four years of rigorous imprisonment.

On 9 January 2014, he was convicted by a Dhaka court of sedition under section 505 (A) of Bangladesh's Penal Code. He was convicted and sentenced to 7 years of imprisonment by the Bangladeshi court for carrying documents provoking interreligious friction, relating to his attempt to travel to Israel.

The campaign to get the government of Bangladesh to drop all charges against Choudhury was led by Dr. Richard Benkin. Benkin, like Choudhury, is an advisory board member of the Islam-Israel Fellowship.

== Controversies ==
=== As a Fraud ===
In 2012, Jewish Telegraphic Agency reported Choudhury is "fraud according to some Jews in the United States and Israel who once supported him". Jweekly also published the same.

=== As Pakistani terrorist HuJI Activist ===
In 2010, Bangladesh CID unearthed a nexus between Choudhury along with Richard Benkin with Pakistani terrorist organization HuJI, following arrest of Kazi Azizul Haque.

=== As Fake news peddler ===
Choudhury has been accused by Bangladeshi newspaper Daily Star of falsely claiming that the Bangladesh Nationalist Party launched "India out movement".

In September 2024, the Indian National Congress lodged a police complaint against Choudhury for allegedly spreading fake news against their leaders.

In 2024, he falsely claimed that Rahul Gandhi was standing with Manmohan Singh's daughter Amrit Singh, when the photo showed Gandhi standing with Congress leader Amitabh Dubey and his wife Amulya Gopalakrishnan.

In 2024, he falsely alleged Sonia Gandhi as an ISI agent, following which he faced several FIRs in Indian judiciary.

In November 2024, he falsely claimed Anusha, the secretary of Karanataka Pradesh Youth Congress Committee, to be a wife of Daniel Stephen Courney who was deported from India in 2017. Anusha later filed an FIR against Choudhary.

In June 2025 Bangladesh Sangbad Sangstha testified another fake news peddling by Choudhury.

=== As controversial journalist ===
In 2006, International Freedom of Expression Exchange named Choudhury as a controversial journalist.
