= Gaberdine =

Medieval long gown or cloak with wide sleeves

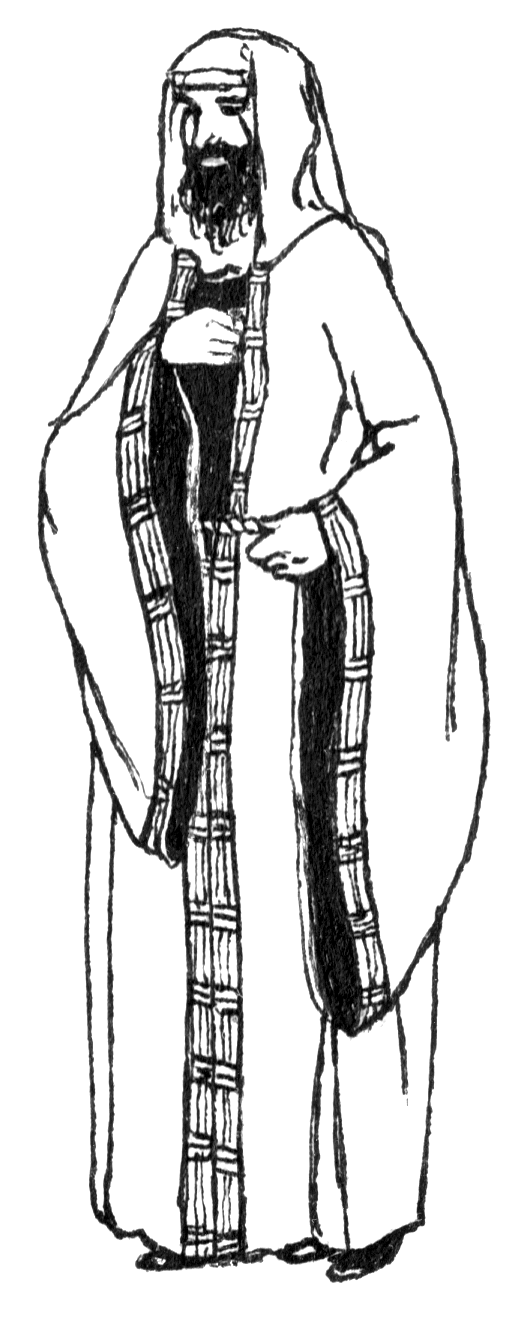
A man wearing a gaberdine

A gaberdine or gabardine is a long, loose gown or cloak with wide sleeves, worn by men in the later Middle Ages and into the 16th century.

In The Merchant of Venice, William Shakespeare uses the phrase "Jewish gaberdine" to describe the garment worn by Shylock, and the term gaberdine has been subsequently used to refer to the overgown or mantle worn by Jews in the medieval era.

== History and etymology ==
In the 15th and early 16th centuries, gaberdine (variously spelled gawbardyne, gawberdyne, gabarden, gaberdin, gabberdine) signified a fashionable overgarment, but by the 1560s it was associated with coarse garments worn by the poor. In the 1611 A Dictionarie of the French and English Tongues, Randle Cotgrave glossed the French term gaban as "a cloake of Felt for raynie weather; a Gabardine". Thomas Blount's Glossographia of 1656 defined a gaberdine as "A rough Irish mantle or horseman's cloak, a long cassock". Aphra Behn uses the term for 'Holy Dress', or 'Friers Habits' in Abdelazer (1676), Act 2; this in a Spanish setting.

In later centuries gaberdine was used colloquially for any protective overgarment, including labourers' smock-frocks and children's pinafores. It is this sense that led Thomas Burberry to apply the name gabardine to the waterproofed twill fabric he developed in 1879.

The word comes from Spanish gabardina, Old French gauvardine, galvardine, gallevardine, possibly from the German term Wallfahrt signifying a pilgrimage or from kaftan.
