= Sessions Court =

Criminal court in some Commonwealth countries

A Sessions Court or even known as the Court of Sessions Judge is a court of law which exists in several Commonwealth countries. A Court of Session is the highest criminal court in a district and the court of first instance for trying serious offences, i.e., those carrying punishment of imprisonment of more than seven years, life imprisonment, or death.

== Bangladesh ==
Sessions Court is a type of lower court in Bangladesh that deals with criminal cases. The Code of Criminal Procedure enables government to establish sessions court in every district or metropolitan city of Bangladesh. Based on location of establishment, Sessions courts are two types, namely

- District Sessions Courts
- Metropolitan Sessions Courts

With the introduction of Metropolitan Police, the amended version of CrPC made it essential for the government to establish separate courts for metropolitan cities. Since then, Metropolitan Sessions Courts have been established in Bangladesh. In districts, both criminal and civil courts are housed in the same facility. Those are usually called District and Session Judge Court.

Based on the type of adjudicator, Sessions Courts are of two types: the Court of Sessions Judges and the Court of Magistrates. Court of Sessions Judge is presided over by a Judge appointed by the government and Courts of Magistrate are presided by a Judicial Magistrate. Court of Magistrate is under control of and subordinate to the Sessions Judge.

The CrPC enables Sessions Judge to pass any sentence authorized by law. But any death sentence passed by such judge needs the confirmation from the High Court Division.

== India and Pakistan ==
District court is referred to as sessions court when it exercises its jurisdiction on criminal matters under Code of Criminal procedure (CrPc)

As per section 9 of CrPc, the court is established by the State Government for every sessions division. The court is presided over by a Judge, appointed by the High Court of that particular state. The High Court may also appoint Additional Sessions Judges and Assistant Sessions Judges in this court.

In Indian cities, the Sessions Court is responsible for adjudicating matters related to criminal cases. The court is responsible for cases relating to murders, theft, dacoity, pick-pocketing and other such cases.

In Mumbai there are two courts, the main one being in the Kala Ghoda region of South Mumbai, the second in Dindoshi in the suburban area of Malad.

Sessions court has the power to impose the full range of penalties for criminal acts, including the death penalty.

Originally, the Sessions Courts heard each case continuously in sessions and delivered judgements immediately on completion of arguments. Hence the name 'Sessions Court' meant that the cases would be disposed off expeditiously. One of the important reasons for delays in the Indian and Pakistani Judicial System, is that the concept of 'Sessions' is observed only in breach due to repeated adjournments, loop holes in the case papers and backlog of cases. The Government of India has not found a solution to this endemic problem.

== Malaysia ==
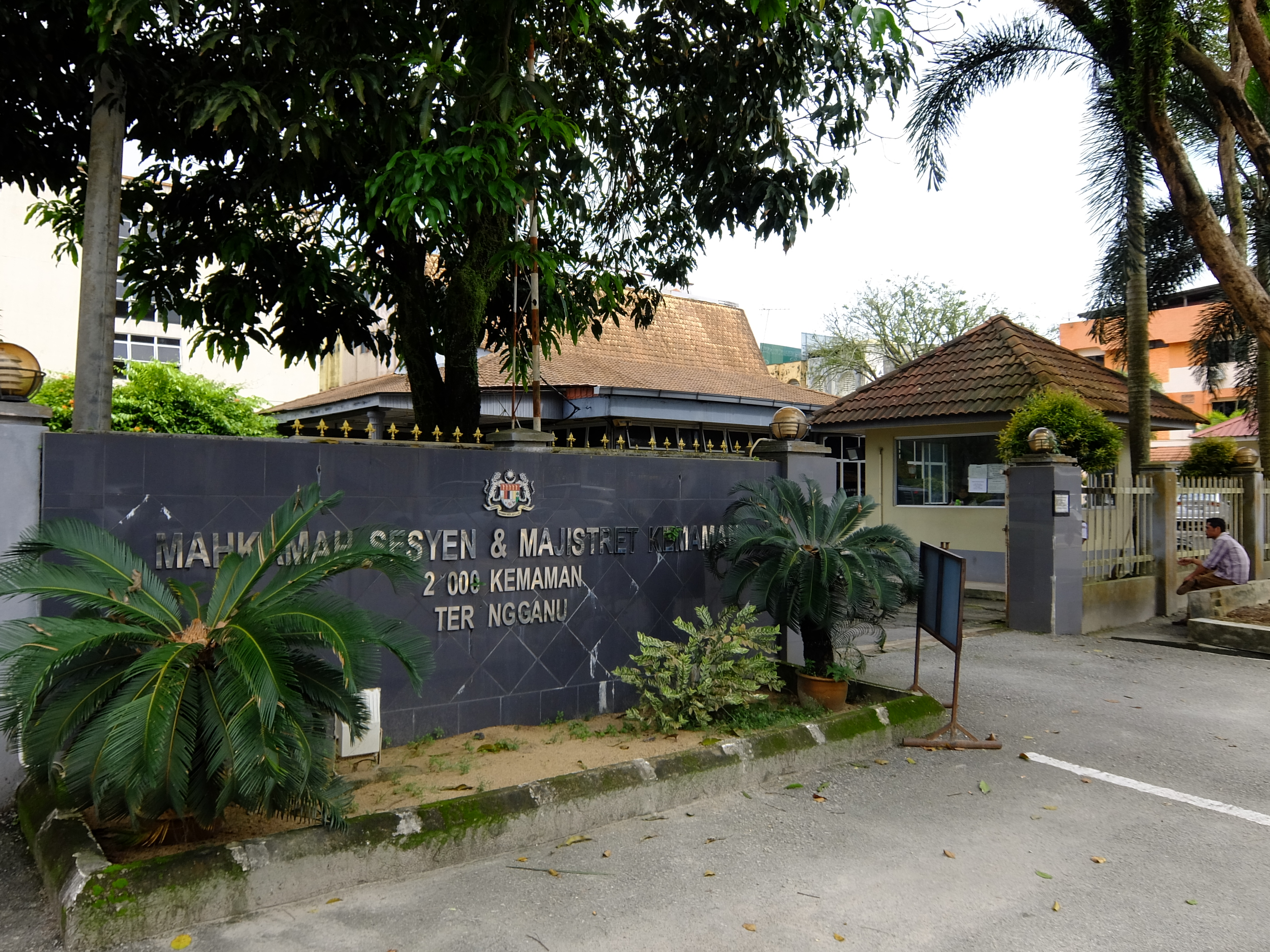
A sessions court in Terengganu, Malaysia.

Somewhat like the former Quarter Sessions in England, but does not exceed RM1,000,000 as per ss 65(1)(b), 73(b), 93(1) of the Subordinate Courts Act 1948 (SCA). The exception however is in matters relating to motor vehicle accidents, landlord and tenant and distress, where the Sessions Courts have unlimited jurisdiction pursuant to s 65(1)(a)SCA. Also, by virtue of s 65(3) SCA, the parties to a legal action may enter into an agreement in writing to grant jurisdiction to the Sessions Court to try an action beyond its prescribed monetary jurisdiction aforesaid.

== See also ==
- District Courts of India
- Courts of Malaysia
- Bombay High Court
- Small Causes Court
