= Metropolitan Sessions Judge in Bangladesh =

Principal judge of the metropolitan sessions division in Bangladesh

Metropolitan Sessions Judge is the principal judge of the metropolitan sessions court, which exist only in metropolitan cities of Bangladesh. Metropolitan sessions judges deal exclusively with the criminal cases arising within metropolitan areas. Sessions judges are appointed by the government according to the 2009 amendment to the Code of Criminal Procedure 1898.

The Code of Criminal Procedure requires the government of Bangladesh to establish separate sessions courts for the metropolitan cities. Metropolitan magistrate courts operate under the control of, and are subordinate to, the metropolitan sessions judge.

== Functions ==
Metropolitan sessions judges control and supervise the courts of additional metropolitan sessions judges and joint metropolitan sessions judges. The metropolitan sessions judge and additional metropolitan sessions judge have the same power to exercise but the business of the additional metropolitan sessions judge is distributed by the metropolitan sessions judge. The metropolitan sessions judge can make rules or give special orders to the joint sessions judges.

== Scope of penalty ==
The Code of Criminal Procedure defines penalties that judges of metropolitan sessions courts can impose. The CrPC empowers the metropolitan sessions judge and the additional metropolitan sessions judge to pass any sentence authorized by law. However, any death sentence passed by such a judge requires confirmation from the High Court Division.

In contrast, the CrPc imposes certain restrictions on the joint metropolitan sessions judge, who may pass any sentence except the death sentence or imprisonment exceeding ten years.
