= Gabardine =

Tough, tightly woven fabric

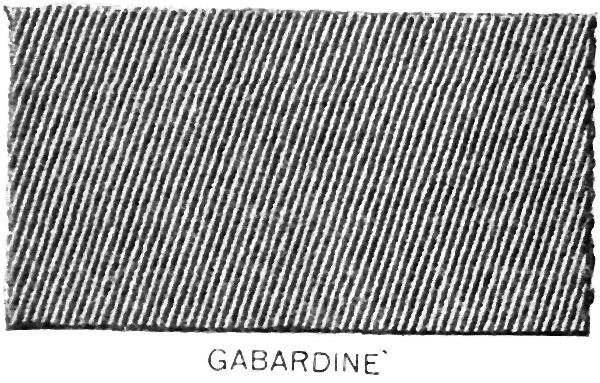
Gabardine

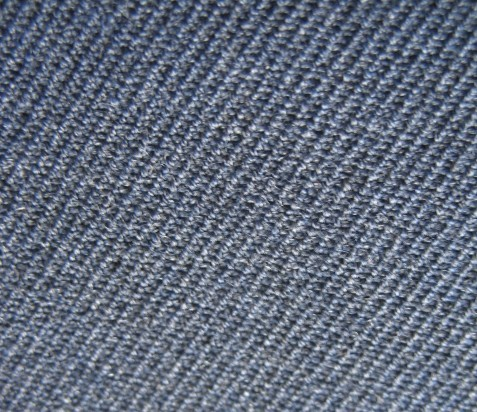
Closeup view of gabardine fabric

Gabardine is a durable twill worsted wool. It is a tightly woven waterproof fabric and is used to make outerwear and various other garments, such as suits, topcoats, trousers, uniforms, and windbreakers. Thomas Burberry created the fabric in the late 1870s and patented it in 1888. The name gabardine comes from "gaberdine", a type of long, cape-like dress worn during the Middle Ages.

Since its debut in the late 19th century, gabardine has taken on an important role in military, active, and outerwear due to its durable, breathable, waterproof, and lightweight nature. In particular, its widespread use by the British Armed Forces during World War I produced the garments now widely recognised as the trench coat.

== History ==
The word gaberdine or gabardine has been used to refer to a particular item of clothing, a sort of long cassock but often open at the front, since at least the 15th century. In the 16th century the term began to be used for outer garments of the poor, later narrowed to a rain cloak or protective smock-frock.

The modern use to describe a fabric rather than a garment dates to Thomas Burberry, founder of the Burberry fashion house in Basingstoke, Hampshire, England, who invented the fabric and revived the name gabardine in 1879. It was introduced by Burberry and patented in 1888. Prior to Burberry's development of gabardine, rubberised cotton (as in the Mackintosh coat) was the most common fabric used for waterproofing, and the material's lack of breathability and heaviness frequently made waterproof clothes uncomfortable. Gabardine, by contrast, was a lightweight, durable, breathable material. Its ability to shed water and break the wind while preserving comfortable wearability helped revolutionise outerwear.

This new material, which was lighter of weight, more breathable, and heavily "water-repellent" instead of entirely "water proof"; could be argued to be the first "soft shell" material.

== Production ==
The original fabric was worsted wool, sometimes in combination with cotton, and was waterproofed using lanolin before weaving. Today the fibre may also be pure cotton, texturised polyester, viscose, or a blend.

Gabardine is woven as a warp-faced steep or regular twill, with a prominent diagonal rib on the face and smooth surface on the back. Gabardine always has many more warp than weft yarns.

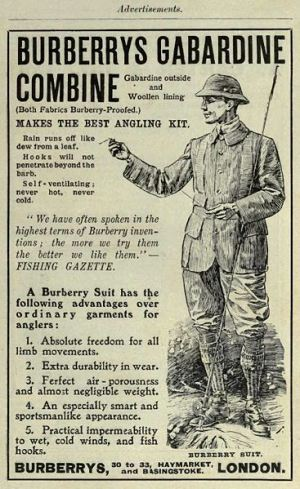
Burberry advertisement for waterproof gabardine suit, 1908

== Applications ==
Gabardine was quickly recognised for its military applications in the United Kingdom. In 1902, the British War Office commissioned Burberry to use the material in designing new coats for its soldiers that would better withstand demanding battlefield conditions. The original coat model produced by that commission was later updated, in 1914, in response to the harsh conditions of trench warfare during World War I. The suitability of gabardine to protecting soldiers from that environment resulted in the design's widespread recognition as a trench coat, which continues to have influence in modern fashion.

Burberry clothing of gabardine was also worn by many polar explorers. The fabric's first arctic field test was performed by Fridtjof Nansen, a Norwegian scientist, explorer, diplomat, and eventual Nobel Peace Prize recipient who wore gabardine on his 1893 Fram expedition toward the North Pole. Subsequent polar explorers donned gabardine after Nansen's expedition, including Roald Amundsen, the first man to reach the South Pole, in 1911, and Ernest Shackleton, who used the material for clothing, tents, and even engine covers during a 1914 expedition to cross Antarctica. A jacket and plus-fours of this material were worn by George Mallory in his attempt on Mount Everest in 1924. In 2006 a replica of Mallory's suit, recreated by using the fragments recovered from his body, was tested on Everest. The project showed that the clothing was effective at providing protection at high altitude.

In the 1950s, gabardine was used to produce colourful patterned casual jackets, trousers and suits. Companies like J. C. Penney, Sport Chief, Campus, Four Star, Curlee, Towncraft, and Oxford Clothes produced short-waisted gabardine jackets, sometimes reversible, commonly known as "Ricky jackets" or "Gab jackets," along with the Hollywood leisure jackets that had been made since the 1930s.

Cotton gabardine is often used by bespoke tailors to make pocket linings for suits, where the pockets' contents would quickly wear holes in flimsy pocket-lining material.

Clothing made from authentic wool gabardine generally requires dry cleaning, as wool likes to shrink in the wash.

== See also ==
- Cambric
- Denim
- Moleskin
- Performance (textiles)
- Whipcord
