= West Country whipping =

Whipping knot

- Category: Whipping
- Related: Sailmaker's whipping
- Typical use: Whipping
- ABoK: #3458

The West Country whipping is a quick practical whipping knot, a method of using twine to secure the end of a rope to prevent it fraying. It has several advantages: it can be tied without a needle; it is simple to understand and remember; if the whipping fails, the loose ends can usually be re-tied to temporarily prevent the rope's end from fraying.

West Country whipping was the name given by Biddlecombe in 1848 to this particular practice, but most subsequent seamanship books, including the British Admiralty Manual of Seamanship, have modified the name to West County whipping...I have not seen this whipping used but it has this advantage: if any part breaks it will be a very long while before the whole whipping lets go. The break will be evident and the whipping can be replaced in time.

— The Ashley Book of Knots

== Technique ==
Half knots are tied alternately behind and in front of the rope until the width of the band of twine approaches the diameter of the rope. A reef (square) knot, or better a series of reef (square) knots, completes the whipping. If a needle is available this string of reef (square) knots can be pulled through the rope to bury the ends. Alternatively, a short bight of another rope can be laid first and used to pull the rope ends through. If the rope is a stranded rope, the ends can usually be pulled through without a needle.

== Alternatives ==
Sailmaker's whipping

The sailmaker's whipping is the yardstick for comparison, for its durability. There are two approaches to forming the frapping turns, the source of the durability, both of which are harder to understand and remember compared to the West Country whipping.

== See also ==
- List of knots
