= Whipcord =

Name for either a fabric or a form of braided cord

Whipcord is the name for either a fabric or a form of braided cord.

== Fabric ==
Whipcord fabric is a strong worsted or cotton fabric made of hard-twisted yarns with a diagonal cord or rib. The weave used for whipcord is a steep-angled twill, essentially the same weave as a cavalry twill or a steep gabardine. However, the ribs of whipcord are usually more pronounced than in either of those fabrics, and the weft (filling) may be visible between the ribs on the right side, which is usually not the case for gabardines. In practice, marketing considerations, rather than technical details, determine when the specific term whipcord is used.

Whipcord is usually found in durable outdoor clothing (typically pants, sometimes jackets) as a 16 to 18oz (ounces per square yard of fabric) wool, or in durable workers' clothing (typically overalls) as a 9 to 12oz cotton. In the latter case, whipcord is an alternative to duck, which has a different weave.

== Cord ==
Whipcord (also "whipcording") is a form of cordage used to make whippings, secure knottings placed over the ends of ropes to keep them from fraying. Sometimes called Interlocking, it is made by plaiting together four strands to make a stronger cord, usually using bobbins to weight the strands and make them easier to control.

It can be worked as a solid color or in a stripe or a diagonal for a two color pattern.
