= Sailmaker's whipping =

Rope whipping

- Category: Whipping
- Related: West Country whipping
- Typical use: Whipping
- ABoK: #3446

The sailmaker's whipping is one of the most durable and stable of rope whippings known. According to The Ashley Book of Knots, "palm-and-needle whipping, or sailmaker's whipping, is the most satisfactory of all."

== Technique ==
=== Palm and needle whipping ===
Using a needle, the twine (generally a waxed cord) is pushed through a strand of the rope at least two times to secure the end, then wrapped multiple times around the rope, to a width generally of the rope. Then the needle is pushed diagonally through each strand, then run once up the furrow between strands. This can be doubled by going around more than once, then finished with a final diagonal after which the excess twine is cut. Ashley also includes a technique to be used if the rope strands are too thick for one thrust of a needle to go through diagonally. The needle work makes it less able to slide.

=== Sailmaker's whipping ===
What Ashley describes as a superficially similar technique, visually, to #3446 is included in The Ashley Book of Knots as #3448. It has the advantage that it doesn't need a needle, strictly speaking. Multiple sources give this separate technique the term sailmaker's whipping.

The twine is first threaded diagonally through the rope strands, leaving an excess loop in the middle of the twine. The twine is wrapped around the rope and then the loop is fit over one of the strand ends, the rope having been opened, such that the loop fits into the groove between strands. The remainder of the twine is pushed through the open part of the rope and fit into the last groove, or in the case of a 4 strand rope, two loops can be used. Finally a reef (square) or a string of reef (square) knots is tied between the two twine ends. Then this string of reef (square) knots is pulled or worked through the rope to bury the ends under the wraps.

== Alternatives ==
West Country whipping

The West Country whipping is a quick practical method using twine, having several advantages: it can be tied without a needle; it is simple to understand and remember; if the whipping fails, the loose ends can usually be re-tied to temporarily prevent the rope's end from fraying.

== See also ==
- List of knots
