= Code of Criminal Procedure of Bangladesh =

Code of Criminal Procedure, 1898

Imperial Legislative Council
- Long title: An Act to consolidate and amend the law relating to criminal procedure in Bangladesh.
- Citation: The Code of Criminal Procedure, 1898
- Territorial extent: Bangladesh
- Enacted: 25 March 1898
- Assented to: 25 March 1898
- Commenced: 1 July 1898

Amended by
- see Amendments

Related legislation
- Penal Code of Bangladesh; Juvenile Justice Act, 2018; Police Act, 1861; Evidence Act, 1872

Summary
- Procedure for administration of substantive criminal laws in Bangladesh.
- Status: In force

Code of Criminal Procedure of Bangladesh, or Code of Criminal Procedure, 1898, commonly known as CRPC, is a fundamental procedural law in Bangladesh that forms the foundation of the country's criminal justice system. This law details all the steps that follow after a crime is committed, such as how an accused person is identified, arrested, investigated, and finally brought to trial and punishment. The Code lays out each of these processes in detail.

It does not just cover how the courts are formed and their powers. It also includes the issuance of summons and warrants, actions against fugitives, search and seizure of property, control of unlawful assemblies, police investigations, filing of complaints, conduct of trials, delivery of verdicts, appeals, reviews, and even protection of civil rights like habeas corpus.

This law was enacted in 1898 during British colonial rule, and it was used throughout the Indian subcontinent. After the independence of Bangladesh, the law was retained with modifications to suit the country's needs and context. Over time, various amendments have been made to keep it humane, inclusive, and in line with a modern justice system. Special focus has been given to the protection of women and children, prevention of torture in police custody, and ensuring the rights of victims in legal proceedings. Several sections have been updated for these purposes.

According to the Code of Criminal Procedure, the law explains in detail when, where, and how a person can file a complaint, how police will investigate, and how the court will accept or dismiss a case. It also covers what types of verdicts a judge can give in different situations. The law clearly states which offences will be tried in a magistrate's court and which will be heard in a sessions court. It also protects the rights of the accused during trial, describes the formation of commissions for witness statements, trials in absence of the accused, and the confiscation of property belonging to fugitives. All these areas of authority are clearly defined in the Code.

Without a proper understanding of the Code’s rules, a lawyer cannot properly file or conduct a case, and a judge cannot complete a trial appropriately. Even ordinary citizens need to know where and how to file a complaint or start a case for any criminal offence. The Code of Criminal Procedure, 1898, is not just a legal framework. It is also considered the basis for justice and fair trials in Bangladesh.

== First Part ==
=== Chapter 1 ===
The first part of the Code of Criminal Procedure mainly sets out the general outline and definitions of the law. It clearly states the title of the law, its commencement date, and where it applies. This law came into effect on July 1, 1898, and is applicable throughout all regions of Bangladesh. The first chapter also includes some important definitions such as bailable and non-bailable offences, arrest, investigation, complaint, police officer, magistrate, and others, which help in understanding the structure of the criminal justice process.

== Second Part ==
This part contains provisions regarding the establishment of different classes of criminal courts and their powers. It plays an important role in shaping the structure of the justice system.

=== Chapter 2: Types of Criminal Courts and their Powers ===
There are two main classes of criminal courts in Bangladesh: the Sessions Court and the Magistrate Court. Sessions Courts deal with serious crimes such as murder, robbery, and rape. The head of this court is the Sessions Judge. Each district has a Sessions Division where the Sessions Court functions. By government notification in the Gazette, several districts can be combined into one Sessions Division.

Magistrate Courts are divided into two types: Judicial Magistrates and Executive Magistrates. Judicial Magistrates conduct criminal trials and are further divided into four categories: Chief Metropolitan Magistrate, First Class, Second Class, and Third Class. Executive Magistrates handle administrative duties such as maintaining law and order and issuing emergency orders.

=== Chapter 3: Judicial Powers and Authority of Judges ===
The power to award punishments depends on the class of the judge's court. The High Court Division can give any punishment prescribed by law. A Sessions Judge can award any sentence, including the death penalty and life imprisonment, but an Additional Sessions Judge can give up to 10 years of imprisonment. A First Class Magistrate can sentence up to 5 years, a Second Class up to 3 years, and a Third Class Magistrate up to 2 years.

== Third Part ==
=== Chapter 4: Jurisdiction for Different Types of Cases ===
This chapter covers the jurisdiction of courts, the duties of the police and the public, and guidelines for public assistance. If a police officer or magistrate asks for help, people must assist in making arrests or maintaining law and order. This chapter also gives directions on which court will hear a case depending on the location of the crime.

=== Chapter 5: Time Limits and Limits on the Judicial Powers of Courts ===
This chapter lays down rules for court proceedings, arrest, and re-arrest. For example, under section 46, police may touch or restrain a person during arrest if the accused does not surrender. However, unnecessary force cannot be used, especially in cases where the offence is not punishable by death. The use of force should never result in death except in cases of capital offences.

Sections 47–48 state that if a suspect hides inside a house, the police may enter with permission and, if necessary, break open doors or windows. But if a woman is present, she must be given the chance to leave first. Section 50 allows the police to impose only as much restraint as necessary to prevent escape. Under Section 54, for special offences, police can arrest without a warrant.

=== Chapter 6: Arrest and Re-Arrest ===
This chapter explains the procedures for ensuring the presence of the accused in court, such as summons, arrest warrants, and seizure of property. If a summons cannot be served, it is posted on the accused’s residence, or an arrest warrant may be issued. If the accused remains absconding, an order for confiscation of property may also be given.

=== Chapter 7: Compelling the Production of Documents and Other Movable Property ===
This chapter outlines the rules for issuing summons or search warrants to collect necessary documents or objects. For seizing bank documents, permission from a higher court is needed. If a judge thinks someone is detained unlawfully, a search warrant may be issued.

== Fourth Part ==
=== Chapter 8: Security for Keeping the Peace and Good Behaviour ===
This chapter allows a person to be released on bail with a condition to maintain peace and good behaviour. If there is a concern that someone may disturb public order in the future, the court may impose certain conditions to ensure security.

=== Chapter 9: Unlawful Assemblies ===
If an assembly of five or more persons poses a threat to public order, the police or an Executive Magistrate may order it to be dispersed. Military assistance may also be sought if necessary.

=== Chapter 10: Public Nuisance ===
If a report is submitted to an Executive Magistrate, he or she may issue orders in the public interest. If these orders are not followed, they may become permanent. In emergencies, immediate prohibitions can also be imposed.

=== Chapter 11: Urgent Orders ===
A District Magistrate or Executive Magistrate may issue a written order to any person to stop a certain activity in the public interest. This order can be issued ex parte and remains valid for up to two months, but the government may extend it if needed.

=== Chapter 12: Disputes Regarding Movable Property ===
If there is a risk of breach of peace due to a dispute over movable property, the Magistrate follows the procedure under Sections 145 and 146. Such disputes can be about land, water bodies, boundaries, or any property. The Magistrate first collects evidence about the dispute and listens to both parties to determine who is actually in possession of the property. If any party has been forcibly dispossessed within the last two months, possession may be restored to that party. According to Section 145, the Magistrate decides based on the evidence who was in possession. The person who is found in possession is allowed to retain it unless lawfully evicted, and the other party is ordered to stay away. If the Magistrate cannot determine which party was in possession, then under Section 146, the property is attached and kept until the court decides. A receiver may be appointed to manage the attached property if there is no court order. Additionally, under Section 147, if there is a dispute about the right of use, such as a right to land or water, the same procedure applies. If the Magistrate finds evidence supporting the right, he may order that no obstruction be placed in the exercise of that right.

=== Chapter 13: Preventive Measures by Police ===
The main responsibility of the police is to prevent crime. According to Section 149, the police can stop any punishable offence and must do their best to prevent it. Section 150 says that if the police learn about a plan to commit a crime, they must inform their superior officer. For the purpose of crime prevention, Section 151 allows the police to arrest a person planning a crime without a warrant. Under Section 152, the police have the authority to prevent damage to any public property. Additionally, they have the power to check the accuracy of weights and measures and to seize them if necessary (Section 153).

== Part Five ==
=== Chapter 14 ===
The role of the police is especially important in crime prevention. When any police officer becomes aware that a crime is about to be committed, he must do everything possible to prevent it. If the police know that a person is planning a crime, they can arrest the suspect even without the permission of a magistrate. In the case of investigating a crime, the police collect information about the offence, begin an investigation based on the complaint, and can question witnesses. All information gathered during the investigation is recorded and sent to the magistrate to take action against the suspects. During the investigation, the police may search the scene of the crime or any relevant evidence. If there is a suspicion that evidence is present in any government or private place, the police can search those premises. After collecting the evidence, it is submitted to the court. Once the investigation based on a complaint is complete, the police prepare a report, which is sent to the magistrate. This report includes details about the accused, witnesses, evidence, and the incident. Based on this, the magistrate can take action against the accused. In addition, if the police see someone about to commit a crime, they can detain that person in police custody to prevent the crime.

== Part Six ==
=== Chapter 15: Jurisdiction of Criminal Courts in Investigation and Trial ===
In criminal cases, the investigation and trial can take place in different locations, depending on the type of crime and where the incident happened. Usually, the court of the area where the crime took place handles the investigation and trial. However, in some cases, the government can transfer cases under several courts to another area. If a crime occurs in multiple places or its consequences occur in various locations, the case can be investigated and tried in any relevant court. If the offence is connected to a continuous act occurring in different regions, it can be tried in any related court. If a crime happens during travel, it can be investigated and tried in any court along the route. When more than one court is involved, the higher court will decide which court will handle the case.

=== Chapter 16: Complaints before a Magistrate ===
Chapter XVI discusses making complaints before a magistrate. When a magistrate proceeds to try an offence based on a complaint, he must examine the complainant and any present witnesses under oath. If the complaint is in writing, this examination is not required, and the case can be transferred to court. In some cases, the magistrate may initially check the evidence and, if necessary, conduct an investigation without the presence of the accused. If there is not enough evidence, the complaint can be dismissed, but the magistrate must briefly state the reasons for that decision.

=== Chapter 17: Commencement of Proceedings before Magistrates ===
This chapter gives instructions on how criminal proceedings are started before a magistrate. It details how charges are framed against the accused, how summons or warrants are issued, and in which cases a lawyer can appear on behalf of the accused instead of the accused himself. If the magistrate finds that the complaint is sufficient, he will issue a summons to the accused. In some cases, a warrant may also be issued. The complainant and prosecution must also submit a list of their witnesses.

If the police are investigating a complaint, the magistrate can delay the trial until the investigation report is received. If a new case is filed based on the complaint, the magistrate can hear the complaint and police report together.

=== Chapter 19: Framing of Charge ===
The main subject of Chapter XIX is how the form and structure of a charge should be determined. A charge must include details of the offence, the accusation against the accused, and the relevant section of the law. If the law gives a crime a specific name, that name must be used in the charge. If there is no specific name, the important elements of the crime must be mentioned so the accused understands the nature of the charge. This is an important part of protecting the accused’s legal rights.

The charge can be written in English or the language specified by the court. If the accused has been previously convicted of an offence and that conviction could increase the sentence for the current offence, this information must be included in the charge. If this information is not included at first, the court can add it at any time before giving a verdict. The charge should mention the time, place, and person or thing involved in the offence. This helps the accused understand exactly what incident the charge is about. For some offences, like breach of trust or embezzlement, it is not necessary to mention a specific date or time, but the total period and amount must be stated. If the description of the offence in the charge does not make its nature clear, then the charge must explain in detail how the offence was committed. In some cases, like murder or theft, it is not necessary to specify the method of the offence, but for crimes like fraud, the method must be stated clearly. The court can change or add to the charge at any time before announcing the verdict. If the change does not cause any harm or confusion to the accused, the trial can continue. If the change is unfair to the accused or creates confusion, the court can order a new trial or postpone the proceedings. If a mistake in the charge misleads the accused and affects the trial, a new trial can be ordered.

=== Chapter 20: Trial of Cases by Magistrates ===
This chapter sets out the rules for trials conducted by magistrates. When the accused appears before the magistrate, the judge considers the case records and documents presented. If the judge believes the charge is baseless, the accused may be released and the reasons for that decision are recorded.

On the other hand, if the judge finds there is evidence of the offence, a formal charge is framed and the accused is asked whether he pleads guilty. If the accused confesses, his statement is recorded and, unless there is a good reason not to, the judge may convict him. If the accused does not plead guilty, the judge hears the prosecution and defence witnesses and collects evidence. At the end of the trial, if the evidence proves the accused is innocent, the judge will acquit him. Otherwise, if found guilty, the accused will be punished according to law. If the complainant is absent and does not attend on the hearing date, the magistrate may acquit the accused, though in some cases the hearing date may be changed. If the complainant shows valid reasons to withdraw the case, the judge may allow it and acquit the accused. At any stage, for special reasons, the magistrate can stop the trial and release the accused if there is no complainant. If the magistrate finds the complaint to be false or malicious, he can order the complainant to pay compensation.

=== Chapter 22: Summary Trials ===
The section on summary trials states that certain magistrates or benches of magistrates can try specific offences in a simplified process. These include offences not punishable by death, life imprisonment, or more than two years’ imprisonment, such as offences relating to weights and measures, minor injuries, thefts within certain limits, dishonest misappropriation of property, receiving or hiding stolen property, and similar crimes. Other offences that can be tried summarily include bribery or fraud in elections, criminal trespass, issuing threats, or insulting with wrongful intent. Magistrates can conduct summary trials without framing a formal charge, but in these cases, if the accused is found guilty, the maximum sentence cannot exceed two years’ imprisonment. In non-appealable cases, the magistrate or bench must briefly record certain facts such as the date of the offence, the accused’s name and address, and evidence of the crime. For appealable cases, a summary of the evidence and the judgment must be recorded. If the trial is conducted under these provisions, the court must write the record in English or the court’s language. The government can authorize a magistrate’s bench to appoint an official to prepare these records and judgments.

=== Chapter 23: Trials in the Sessions Court ===
The rules for trials in the Sessions Court are described in this chapter. Firstly, every trial in the Sessions Court must be conducted by a public prosecutor. When the accused is present or brought to court, the prosecutor opens the case by stating the charges against the accused and how the evidence will prove guilt. If the court finds that the case records and presented documents do not provide a sufficient basis, the accused will be acquitted and the reasons will be recorded. But if the court believes that the accused has committed the offence, a written charge will be framed and the accused will be asked whether he pleads guilty. If the accused pleads guilty, the court will record it and may convict him if appropriate. If the accused does not plead guilty, the court will set a date for examining the witnesses and may issue directions to produce witnesses or documents at the request of the prosecution. On the specified date, the court will hear the prosecution evidence and question the witnesses. The court may, at its discretion, allow cross-examination to be postponed or repeated. If, based on the evidence, the court finds the accused not guilty, he will be acquitted. But if not acquitted, the accused will be asked to present his defence, and any written statement given by the accused will be attached to the record. If the accused applies to produce a witness, the court must allow it unless it is intended to delay or harass. After all the evidence is heard, the prosecutor will present the case briefly, and the accused or his lawyer will reply. The court will then deliver judgment after considering the evidence and legal arguments.

=== Chapter 24: General Provisions for Inquiry and Trial ===
These provisions mainly define the rights and responsibilities of the accused and other involved parties during the trial process, especially in cases where an accused is offered a pardon or the trial is held in their absence.

Offer of Pardon to a Person Involved in an Offence: In certain serious offences, such as those where the punishment may be ten years or more, the court can offer a pardon to a person directly or indirectly involved in the crime. However, this pardon is only valid if the accused truthfully reveals everything they know about the offence in court and discloses information about other people involved. The purpose is to encourage those involved to provide accurate information so justice can be served. The court will record the reasons for granting such a pardon and may provide a copy of that record to the accused.

Trial of a Pardoned Person: If the person who received the pardon does not comply with its conditions—such as by giving false testimony or hiding the crime—they can be retried. In this trial, the accused may claim they followed the terms of the pardon, and it is up to the prosecution to prove otherwise. If the accused is found to have lied under oath, a new case can be filed, and the court will judge them based on that information.

Trial in Absence of the Accused: If an accused does not surrender to the court and there is little chance of arresting them, the court may issue a public notice ordering them to appear. If the accused does not surrender within the specified time, the trial may proceed in their absence. This especially applies to those who are fugitives or unwilling to appear in court. The court can conduct the hearing and deliver judgment even if the accused is not present.

Time Limit for Completing Trials: Trials must be completed within a specific time depending on the court. Cases under a magistrate should be finished within 180 days, and cases under a sessions court should be finished within 360 days. In some special situations, such as when an accused faces multiple cases, trials may proceed one after another. If the trial is not completed within the given time, the accused may be released on bail, unless the court orders otherwise for special reasons.

Protection and Testimony for the Accused: The accused has the right to be defended by a lawyer. The accused can also choose to testify on their own behalf. However, neither the court nor any other party may make negative remarks about the accused’s decision not to testify as a witness.

Other General Guidelines: The court must fully explain the trial process to the accused and, as needed, discuss matters with them to ensure they understand the case. If the accused does not understand the proceedings, the court must take special measures based on their circumstances. The court may also adjourn the hearing if a witness is absent or for other reasonable causes. In such cases, the judge must record the reasons in writing and set a new hearing date.

Compounding of Offences: For certain offences under the Penal Code, the injured party may, with the court's permission, come to a settlement with the accused. This will lead to the accused being acquitted. However, no settlement is valid without the court’s approval. If the victim is a minor or mentally unwell, the court may allow another person to make a settlement on their behalf. These rules are important for safeguarding the accused’s rights, ensuring timely trials, and conducting cases properly.

=== Chapter 25: Examination and Recording of Evidence in Investigation and Trial ===
This chapter sets out various rules for receiving and recording evidence during investigation and trial. Most of the time, evidence is taken in the presence of the accused or their lawyer, unless the court excuses their personal attendance.

Rules for Taking Evidence: When a magistrate or sessions judge records the testimony of witnesses, it should be written in a narrative form. Usually, evidence is not recorded in question-and-answer format, but special questions and answers can be separately recorded if the magistrate or judge thinks necessary. In both sessions courts and magistrate courts, testimony should be recorded in the court’s language or in a language understood by the accused. If the evidence is given in English and the accused does not understand English, it must be translated and recorded in the language of the court.

Recording Testimony: Every witness's testimony must be written and signed by the magistrate or sessions judge. If the magistrate or judge cannot write it personally, it will be written in open court under their direction and then signed by them.

Reading Evidence to the Accused: After testimony is recorded, it must be read aloud to the accused or their lawyer. If any corrections or changes are needed, they must be made. If a witness feels that something has been wrongly recorded, the magistrate or judge must note the objection and add their comments.

Language and Translation: If the evidence is recorded in a language that the witness or the accused does not understand, it must be translated and explained to them in a language they do understand. If the accused or their lawyer cannot understand, the court must ensure they receive a proper translation.

Recording Examination and Statements of the Accused: When the accused is questioned before a magistrate or sessions judge, all questions and answers must be recorded in full. This record must be read to the accused, and if they do not understand the language, it must be translated for them. The accused can add or correct anything in their answers, and their signature must appear on the record.

Notes on Witness’s Demeanour: The magistrate or judge may also record remarks about a witness’s demeanour or behaviour, such as how they acted while giving evidence, if it is relevant to the case.

=== Chapter 26: Regarding Judgments ===
This chapter describes the procedures and process for delivering judgments. In criminal courts, judgments are usually announced in open court after the trial. The judgment can be announced either immediately after the trial or on a later fixed date, and the accused or their lawyer will be notified in advance. If the accused or their lawyer requests, the judge must read out the entire judgment.

When the judgment is pronounced, if the accused is in custody, they must be brought to court. If the accused is on bail or acquitted, their personal attendance is not mandatory; their lawyer may be present. Even if any party or their lawyer is absent, the judgment will still be valid and legal. The judgment is usually written in the official language of the court or in English, and it must include the main issues of the case, the answers to those issues, and the reasons for the decision. At the time of delivery, the judge must sign the judgment in open court.

The judgment must specify the offence proved against the accused and the sentence as per the law. If an offence falls under two sections of the Penal Code and the court is unsure, the judgment can be given alternatively. If the accused is acquitted, the judgment will direct their release. In the case of the death penalty, the court will order that the accused be executed by hanging. After pronouncement, if the accused requests, they must be given a copy of the judgment or a translated copy in their own language. This will be free of cost unless the case falls under a special section. In cases of a death sentence, the sessions judge will inform the accused about the time limit to file an appeal. If the original judgment is in a language different from the court's language, a translated copy will be attached to the court record upon the accused’s request. When the sessions court gives a judgment, a copy of the judgment and sentence must be sent to the Chief Metropolitan Magistrate or Chief Judicial Magistrate and the District Magistrate of the district where the trial was held. These procedures ensure transparency and fair justice for the accused in the judicial process.

=== Chapter 27: Submission for Confirmation of Sentences ===
This chapter deals with the process of confirming death sentences and submitting such cases to higher courts. When a sessions court passes a sentence of death on any person, the judgment must be submitted to the High Court Division for confirmation. The death penalty cannot be carried out without the approval of the High Court Division. After submission, if the higher court feels further investigation or additional evidence is needed, it can conduct the investigation itself or order the sessions court to do so. In such cases, the accused’s presence is not mandatory unless the High Court Division orders it. The results of the investigation and collected evidence will be sent from the sessions court to the High Court Division.

After submission, the High Court Division may confirm the death sentence, impose another punishment as per law, or set aside the conviction and pass a new judgment or order a retrial. The High Court Division can also acquit the accused. However, before confirming the judgment, the court must wait until the period for appeal has passed or, if an appeal is ongoing, until it is resolved. If the High Court Division bench consists of two or more judges, at least two must sign the judgment to confirm a death sentence or other punishment. If there is a difference of opinion, the final decision will be based on the opinion of a third judge. Once the death sentence is confirmed in such cases submitted from the sessions court, the High Court Division will send its decision promptly to the sessions court.

=== Chapter 28: Execution of Sentences ===
The provisions under "Execution of Sentences" mainly discuss the procedures for carrying out various punishments, including the death penalty, as directed by the criminal court. Firstly, when a sessions court passes a death sentence, it must be sent to the High Court Division for approval. Only after approval can the sessions court execute the death sentence according to the High Court's orders. However, if a woman sentenced to death is found to be pregnant, the High Court Division will suspend the death sentence and, if necessary, commute it to life imprisonment.

When an accused is sentenced to imprisonment or corporal punishment, the court sends a warrant to the relevant jail for execution of the sentence. This warrant is addressed to the head officer of the jail and must be delivered to the jailer. If a fine is imposed as punishment, the court may issue a warrant to confiscate the property of the accused for realization of the fine. However, if the accused has already served imprisonment for non-payment of the fine, no further warrant for realization of the fine shall be issued, unless the court finds special reasons to do so.

When the accused is punished with a fine or imprisonment in the alternative, the court may allow a specific period for payment of the fine and order imprisonment if it is not paid. In this case, the court may release the accused on bail, requiring them to appear before the court to pay the fine within the specified time. Also, if the accused is sentenced to whipping, it will be carried out at a designated place and time as per the court's order. If the accused is sentenced to both whipping and imprisonment, the whipping will be executed 15 days after sentencing or after an appeal is filed, whichever is later.

A medical officer must be present during the execution of corporal punishment. If the accused is ill or declared unfit by the medical officer, the punishment will be suspended. If a minor (child) is sentenced to imprisonment, the court may send them to a reformatory instead, where they will receive proper discipline and training. After execution of the sentence, the officer responsible must submit a report to the court stating how and when the sentence was carried out.

=== Chapter 29: Suspension, Remission, and Commutation of Sentences ===
The chapter on suspension, remission, and commutation of sentences explains the rules for reducing, suspending, or altering a convicted person’s punishment. It mainly sets out how administrative and judicial powers may be used in certain situations to grant relief to convicted persons.

Suspension of sentence means the punishment will not be carried out for a certain period, often during special circumstances or while an appeal is pending. For example, if an accused appeals against a conviction, the sentence may be suspended while the appeal is being considered. Remission means canceling part or all of the sentence, which is usually done through presidential pardon or clemency. Remission may be granted for reasons like good conduct, special circumstances, or physical illness, or after long imprisonment.

Commutation means changing the punishment to a lesser one, such as reducing a death sentence to life imprisonment if the court or president deems that the full punishment is not justified. The chapter specifies that the court or relevant authority may suspend, remit, or commute a sentence as they see fit, subject to appropriate procedures and conditions. However, such powers usually rest with the President or higher courts. Remission or commutation of sentence takes effect only when all necessary steps and conditions have been properly fulfilled.

=== Chapter 30: Previous Acquittal or Conviction ===
This chapter deals with the principle that if a person has been acquitted or convicted for an offence, they cannot be tried again for the same offence. If a person is tried in court for an offence and is either convicted or acquitted, they cannot be retried for the same offence as long as that conviction or acquittal stands.

Also, the person cannot be retried for any other charge arising from the same facts, except as permitted under section 236 or 237. However, if the person could have been tried for a separate offence at the first trial but was not, they may be tried for that different offence later. For example, if someone is convicted for an offence arising from a particular incident, but later new consequences of the incident come to light which were unknown during the first trial, they may be tried again for those new consequences.

If acts committed during the trial form a different offence, the person may be tried later for that offence, if the first court did not have the authority to try it. Dismissal of a complaint, closure of proceedings under section 249, or the release of the accused is not considered an acquittal.

== Part Seven: Appeal, Reference, and Revision ==
This part provides guidance on the rules for appeal, reference, and review in the criminal justice system. It details how an accused, complainant, or the government can appeal against any order or judgment related to an offence, and in which cases appeal is not allowed.

=== Chapter 31: Appeal ===
The main subject of this chapter is the procedures and opportunities for appealing against a criminal court’s judgment or order. No appeal can be made against a judgment unless it is allowed by law. However, appeals are allowed against orders refusing to restore property or requiring security for keeping the peace. In the case of judgments by second or third class magistrates, appeals can be made to the Chief Judicial Magistrate. For judgments by first class magistrates, appeals lie to the Sessions Judge. Appeals against orders by Sessions or Additional Sessions Judges can be made to the High Court Division.

Generally, no appeal can be made against a conviction based on a guilty plea. For minor offences such as imprisonment for one month or a fine of fifty taka, the right to appeal is limited. However, if multiple persons are convicted together, they have the right to appeal. Appeals to higher courts may be made regarding an increase or decrease in sentence, and the court can revise the sentence as appropriate. If the accused is in jail, they can submit an appeal through the proper authorities. The court will not dismiss an appeal without giving the appellant a hearing and will admit the appeal if required.

=== Chapter 32: Reference and Revision ===
This chapter describes the process by which higher courts may review the correctness, legality, or regularity of orders or judgments passed by lower courts. The High Court Division or Sessions Judge may review the records of any lower court and check whether the orders or judgments are correct, legal, and regular. If they find any order or judgment to be wrong, illegal, or irregular, they may take corrective action.

The higher court may enhance a sentence but must not do so without giving the accused a chance to defend themselves. If two judges disagree on a point, a third judge will hear the matter and the final decision will be based on their opinion. Even if a party has no right of appeal, the court may use its revision powers and call for a hearing if needed.

=== Chapter 33: Disposal of Appeals and References ===
This chapter sets out the rules for the timeframe in which appeals and revisions should be resolved. After accepting an appeal, the appellate court should dispose of it on the scheduled hearing date, usually within 90 days from the date the notice is served on the other party. For revision proceedings, the court must dispose of the case within 90 days from serving notice to the parties. Only working days are counted for this period; holidays are excluded.

== Part Eight: Special Proceedings ==
This part discusses legal procedures for accused persons with mental illness and for offences affecting the administration of justice. It includes rules for mental assessment, detention or bail, and the powers of the court in cases of contempt, wrongful detention, and habeas corpus applications for release of prisoners.

=== Chapter 34: Persons of Unsound Mind ===
When a judge or magistrate believes an accused person is mentally unfit and unable to defend themselves, they must investigate the accused’s mental condition. The accused will be examined by the district civil surgeon or another government-appointed medical officer. If, after the medical examination, the magistrate finds the accused to be of unsound mind, the trial will be suspended. If the accused is not a threat to public safety, they may be released on bail with proper security. The accused can also be ordered to be kept in safe custody. If evidence of mental recovery is found, the trial will resume.

=== Chapter 35: Proceedings for Offences Affecting the Administration of Justice ===
This chapter outlines the investigation and trial of offences that disrupt the proper functioning of the justice system or show contempt for the court. If the court believes that an offence related to its proceedings has occurred, it may order an investigation. If preliminary investigation finds sufficient evidence, the court will file a written complaint and send the accused to the magistrate. If bail is necessary, the court will make arrangements accordingly.

For some offences, such as disrespectful behavior in court or failing to comply with court summons, the court may take immediate action. In such cases, the court can impose a fine or short imprisonment. If the offence is serious and a fine is insufficient, the court may send the case to the magistrate.

=== Chapter 37: Directions of Habeas Corpus Nature ===
The High Court Division may, at any time, order that a person detained within its jurisdiction be brought before the court for legal action, or that a person who is illegally or improperly detained be released. The court can also order a detainee to be produced as a witness, for investigation, to appear before a military court or commissioners, or to be transferred from one custody to another for judicial proceedings. The Supreme Court may make rules as needed for such cases. These provisions do not apply to persons under preventive detention.

== Part IX: Supplementary Provisions ==
This section briefly describes various provisions of the Code of Criminal Procedure, covering the appointment and functions of public prosecutors, bail conditions, guidelines for the examination of witnesses, special rules for collecting evidence, bail provisions, disposal of property, transfer of criminal cases, the impact of irregular proceedings, and other legal matters. These rules and guidelines are essential for improving the process and functioning of the courts in different types of cases.

=== Chapter 38: Public Prosecutor ===
This chapter describes how public prosecutors are appointed and how they operate, the conditions for bail, and the rules for when and how bail may be granted. It also includes instructions about the examination of witnesses, including issuing commissions if a witness cannot be present. Special procedures for collecting evidence are discussed, such as medical testimony and reports from chemical examiners. There are also rules about bail, such as what to do if the surety dies or becomes insolvent. The chapter discusses the custody and disposal of property during and after a trial. It explains how criminal cases may be transferred and describes the powers of appellate courts. The chapter also addresses the effect of irregularities in proceedings and how such issues can be resolved. Finally, it mentions other legal provisions such as affidavits, summons to witnesses, and the rules for paying specified fees. All these provisions help make the functioning of the courts and judicial process more orderly and effective.

=== Chapter 39: Bail ===
This chapter outlines the various provisions regarding bail. It states that if a person is not involved in a non-bailable offence and is arrested without a warrant, they should be released on bail upon offering bail to the police or court. However, if the court or police feels the person can be released on certain conditions without bail, they may release the person on a bond without sureties.

For non-bailable offences, if the accused is charged with an offence punishable by death or life imprisonment, they will not be granted bail. However, children under sixteen, women, or sick or infirm persons may be granted bail by the court. At any stage of investigation or trial, if it appears there is not enough evidence against the accused, bail may be granted. Before announcing the verdict, if the court believes the accused is not guilty, the person may be released on a bond. The High Court Division or Sessions Court can order re-arrest and take back into custody any person released on bail.

The amount of bond set for bail must be appropriate to the circumstances and not excessive. The High Court Division or Sessions Court may reduce the amount of bail fixed by a police officer or magistrate, or order release on bail. Before granting bail, the accused must execute a bond for a specified amount as determined by the police officer or court. If granted bail, the accused must appear at the specified place and time, and remain there until the court directs otherwise.

After the bond is executed, the accused is released, and if in jail, the court will order their release, and jail authorities must release them upon receiving the order. If insufficient sureties are accepted by mistake or fraud, or later become inadequate, the court may order the accused to be arrested and brought before the court to find new sureties. If no new surety is found, the accused will be sent to jail. If sureties wish to be discharged from their bond, they may apply to the magistrate, who will then order the accused to appear. Once the accused appears, the bond will be cancelled. If the accused fails to provide new sureties, they will be taken into custody again.

=== Chapter 40: Examination of Witnesses ===
This section briefly describes the rules for issuing commissions to take the testimony of witnesses. When a witness is needed in an investigation, trial, or other proceeding but their attendance would cause delay, expense, or difficulty, the magistrate or court may dispense with their attendance and issue a commission for their testimony. This commission directs the magistrate of the area where the witness resides to take the testimony.

If the witness is in a Commonwealth country or Burma and there is a reciprocal arrangement for commissions, a commission can be issued to the appropriate court or judge in that country. In such cases, the parties may submit written questions for examination, and the magistrate or officer will ask the witness those questions. Parties or their lawyers may cross-examine the witness. Once the commission is properly executed, it is returned to the original court, and the testimony becomes part of the case record. This testimony can be used as evidence in future court proceedings.

=== Chapter 41: Special Rules of Evidence ===
This chapter briefly sets out special rules regarding evidence and how different types of evidence are to be accepted in court. In the case of medical witnesses, if a civil surgeon or other doctor cannot appear in court, their deposition taken before a magistrate or by commission may be used as evidence. The court may also question the doctor about their deposition.

For post-mortem reports, if the doctor who wrote the report is dead or unable to testify, the report can still be accepted as evidence. In cases where a witness cannot be present, their report is essential. Reports from government chemical examiners, fingerprint experts, and firearms experts prepared on specific matters can also be accepted as evidence in court, even if the experts are not present. These reports are important as evidence in judicial proceedings.

Formal evidence, such as official documents, may be accepted in affidavit form, and the court may call the person who submitted it for cross-examination if it wishes. This gives both parties a chance to know more about the evidence. Previous convictions or acquittals are also significant in court. These can be proven by a certified copy from court or prison records, but the identity of the accused must be confirmed.

If an accused person is absconding and cannot be arrested, the court may record the testimony of witnesses in their absence. Such testimony can later be used as evidence against the accused if the witness dies or is unable to testify. Even if the accused is unknown, for serious offences, the High Court Division may order a first-class magistrate to investigate, and the testimony of witnesses taken in that process may later be used to prove the crime.

=== Chapter 42: Provisions Regarding Bonds ===
This chapter describes various rules about bail and bonds. It explains that when a person is required to execute a bond before a court or an official, they may submit the bond with or without sureties. However, this option does not apply for bonds related to good behavior. Instead of submitting a bond, the court may allow a person to deposit a specified sum of money or government promissory notes.

When any bond is forfeited, the court must record the reason for such forfeiture and may order the person who broke the bond's conditions to pay a penalty. If the accused does not pay the penalty, the court can issue a warrant to seize and sell their movable property. If the penalty still cannot be collected in this way, the accused can be detained in civil jail for up to six months. The court may also remit a part of the penalty if it sees fit. If a surety dies, their property will not be liable for the bond. If the person bound by the bond is convicted of an offence that violates the conditions of the bond, the court can cancel the bond and take action against the surety. In such cases, unless proven otherwise, the court will presume the violation of bond conditions.

If a surety becomes insolvent or dies, or if any bond is forfeited, the court may order the accused to provide a new surety. If a new surety is not found, the court may take the same steps as before. If a person required to sign a bond is a minor, the court may accept a bond only from the surety.

An appeal against any order relating to bonds can be made to the District Magistrate, Sessions Judge, or Metropolitan Sessions Judge. If no appeal is filed, the respective judge or magistrate can review the order. The High Court Division or Sessions Court may direct a magistrate to realize the money due on a bond.

=== Chapter 43: Disposal of Property ===
This chapter outlines various provisions related to the disposal of property. When property related to an offence is brought before the court, the judge may order its proper custody until the case is resolved. If the property is in danger of being quickly damaged, the court can order it to be sold or otherwise disposed of after recording necessary evidence.

When the trial for an offence ends, the court may order the property to be destroyed, confiscated, or handed over to the rightful owner. If the court itself cannot execute this order, it may direct the District Magistrate to carry it out. If an appeal is filed, the order will not be enforced until the appeal is resolved.

If someone buys stolen property connected to a criminal act, and it is later proven that the buyer purchased it knowingly or unknowingly, the court may order a portion of the purchase money to be returned to the buyer from the funds deposited by the seller. This order will be carried out when the stolen property is returned to its rightful owner.

The appellate court has the power to stay or change any order passed by a lower court. The court can also order the destruction of any object involved in criminal acts, such as obscene or harmful items, food, drink, medicine, or other goods.

If a person is forcibly removed from movable property through criminal force or intimidation, the court can order the person to recover their property. However, this order will not affect any civil rights or interests in the property.

If the police seize any property, they must report it to the magistrate, who will then order its proper custody, transfer, or, if the owner is unknown, its preservation. If the owner is unknown, the magistrate will publish a notice requiring claimants to come forward within a specified time.

If no claimant is found within six months, and the person from whom the property was seized cannot prove it was lawfully acquired, the property will vest in the government and be sold. If the property is at risk of quick deterioration and the owner is unknown, the magistrate may order its sale.

=== Chapter 44: Transfer of Criminal Cases ===
The Appellate Division may transfer a specific case or appeal from one permanent bench of the High Court to another. Similarly, a criminal court under one area can transfer a case to a court of equal or higher rank in another area if it is needed for justice or for the convenience of the parties and witnesses. This ensures a fair trial process.

The High Court Division may also suspend the investigation or trial of any case under a lower court and decide to conduct the trial itself. This can happen if an impartial trial seems impossible, if there is a particular legal complexity, or if required for the fair completion of the process. The court may take this step on its own initiative, on a report from a lower court, or on a party's application.

However, to transfer a case within courts of the same sessions division, an application must be made first to the Sessions Judge. Only if that application is rejected can a further application be made to the High Court. The Sessions Judge may withdraw a case from an Assistant Sessions Judge or Additional Sessions Judge and either try it personally or send it to another court. Similarly, a Metropolitan or District Magistrate may withdraw a case from a subordinate magistrate and either conduct or transfer the trial.

=== Chapter 45: Irregular Proceedings ===
This chapter explains different rules about irregular proceedings in trials. Some irregularities or mistakes will not invalidate the trial if they were done fairly and in good faith. For example, if a magistrate who does not legally have certain powers issues a search warrant or directs an investigation, this process will not be void simply because of the lack of authority.

On the other hand, there are certain specific irregularities that can make a trial void. For example, if a magistrate without legal power orders the seizure and sale of property, demands security for keeping the peace, or holds a hearing against an accused, these actions will be considered invalid.

If a case is tried in the wrong place, this alone will not set aside the trial, conviction, or order unless it causes a failure of justice. If any rule is not followed when recording a confession, but this does not affect the trial, the confession may still be accepted as evidence. If no formal charge is framed against an accused, and this does not lead to a failure of justice, it will not void the conviction or order. If the court believes the absence of a formal charge has caused a failure of justice, it will order a new charge and restart the trial.

Even if there are mistakes or irregularities during a trial, they will not be grounds for altering or setting aside a conviction, sentence, or order unless they result in a failure of justice.

=== Chapter 46: Miscellaneous ===
This part outlines various procedural rules that apply in court. If any affidavit is to be presented before a higher court or its officers, it may be sworn in front of that court, the clerk of the state, or any other appointed officer.

If anyone wants to prove the conduct of a government officer, they may submit an affidavit as evidence. However, the affidavit should be based only on information personally known to the applicant and what they believe to be true.

If a judge or magistrate feels it is necessary to directly inspect the place where an offence took place, they can do so after informing the parties. A memorandum of such inspection will be made and included in the case file.

The court can summon any person at any time to give evidence, or recall someone who has already testified if their evidence is needed for a just decision. If a trial or inquiry continues in the absence of the accused, the court may allow the accused's lawyer to represent them, but can require the personal presence of the accused if deemed necessary.

If an offender is ordered to be held in jail, the government will decide where they will be detained. If a person held in civil jail is transferred to criminal jail, they will be sent back to civil jail after release unless another law applies.

If the evidence of a witness needs to be translated, the translator must translate it truthfully and accurately. The court may also order the government to pay reasonable expenses of a complainant or witness.

== Notes ==
=== Book ===
- Halim, Md. Abdul. Text Book on Code of Criminal Procedure.
- Islam, Muhammad Nazrul. Reflections on The Law of Evidence.

=== Reserche Article ===
- Faruque, Rahaman. (2020). “Absence of Respect and Recognition of Victims in the Criminal Justice System of Bangladesh.” _International Journal of Emerging Trends in Social Sciences_...
- Hoque, Ridwanul. (2021). “Criminal law and the Constitution: The relationship revisited.”
- (2024). “A Critical Review on the Role of Police in Ensuring Justice under the Criminal Justice System.”

=== Historycal & analytics ===
- Panday, Pranab Kumar & Mollah, Md. Awal Hossain. (2014). “The Judicial System of Bangladesh: An Overview from Historical Viewpoint.”
- “Evolution of the criminal justice system in Bangladesh – colonial legacies, trends and issues.”

=== another source ===
- Supreme Court bulletin on Section 247 (CrPC) interpretations.
- Studies on custodial torture and police procedure in Bangladesh.
