= Common whipping =

Type of knot

- Names: Common whipping, Plain whipping, Ordinary whipping, Wolf whipping
- Category: Whipping
- ABoK: #3442

The common whipping is the simplest type of whipping knot, a series of knots intended to stop a rope from unravelling. As it can slip off the rope easily, the common whipping should not be used for rope ends that will be handled. This whipping knot is also called 'wolf' whipping in some parts of the world. The 'Hangman's knot' is a variation of this whipping knot.

The benefit of a common whipping is that no tools are necessary and the rope does not need to be unlaid. The problem is that it will slide off the end of the rope with little provocation. Other whippings avoid this by interleaving the whipping with the strands of the rope and creating friction with the strands to avoid slipping.

Normally a natural fibre rope is whipped with twine. The size of the rope dictates the size of the twine. Any twine can be used, but tarred two strand hemp (marline) is preferred. Artificial-fibre ropes should have their ends fused by heat rather than whipped to prevent unravelling.

Common, plain or ordinary whipping is tied by laying a loop along the rope and then making a series of turns over it. The working end is finally stuck through this loop and the end hauled back out of sight. Both ends are then trimmed short.

— The Ashley Book of Knots

== Process ==
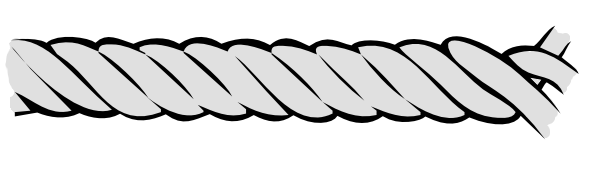

The rope should be whipped a short distance (One and a half times the diameter) from its end.

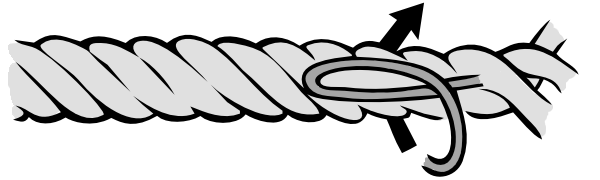

Lay the head of the twine along the rope, make a bight back along the rope

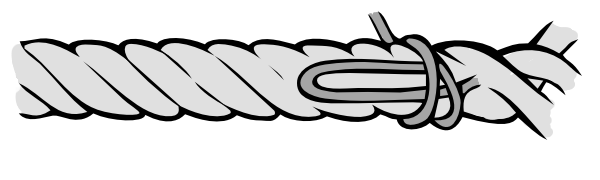

Begin wrapping the twine around the rope and bight of twine securely.

Wrap until the whipping is one and a half times wider than the rope is thick

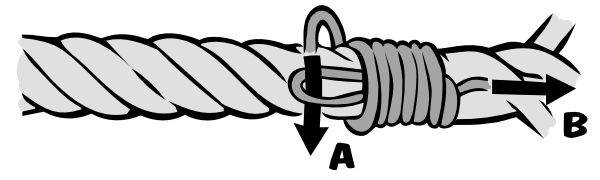

Slip the working end of the twine through the bight. Carefully pull on the standing end of the twine until the bight and working end are pulled under the whipping (Note: It is normally necessary to maintain tension on the working end to prevent the bight from being dragged completely through and so destroying the whipping)

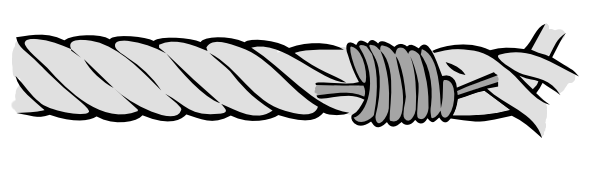

Cut the twine flush with the edges of the whipping and the rope end not less than half its width from the whipping to give the rope end a finished look

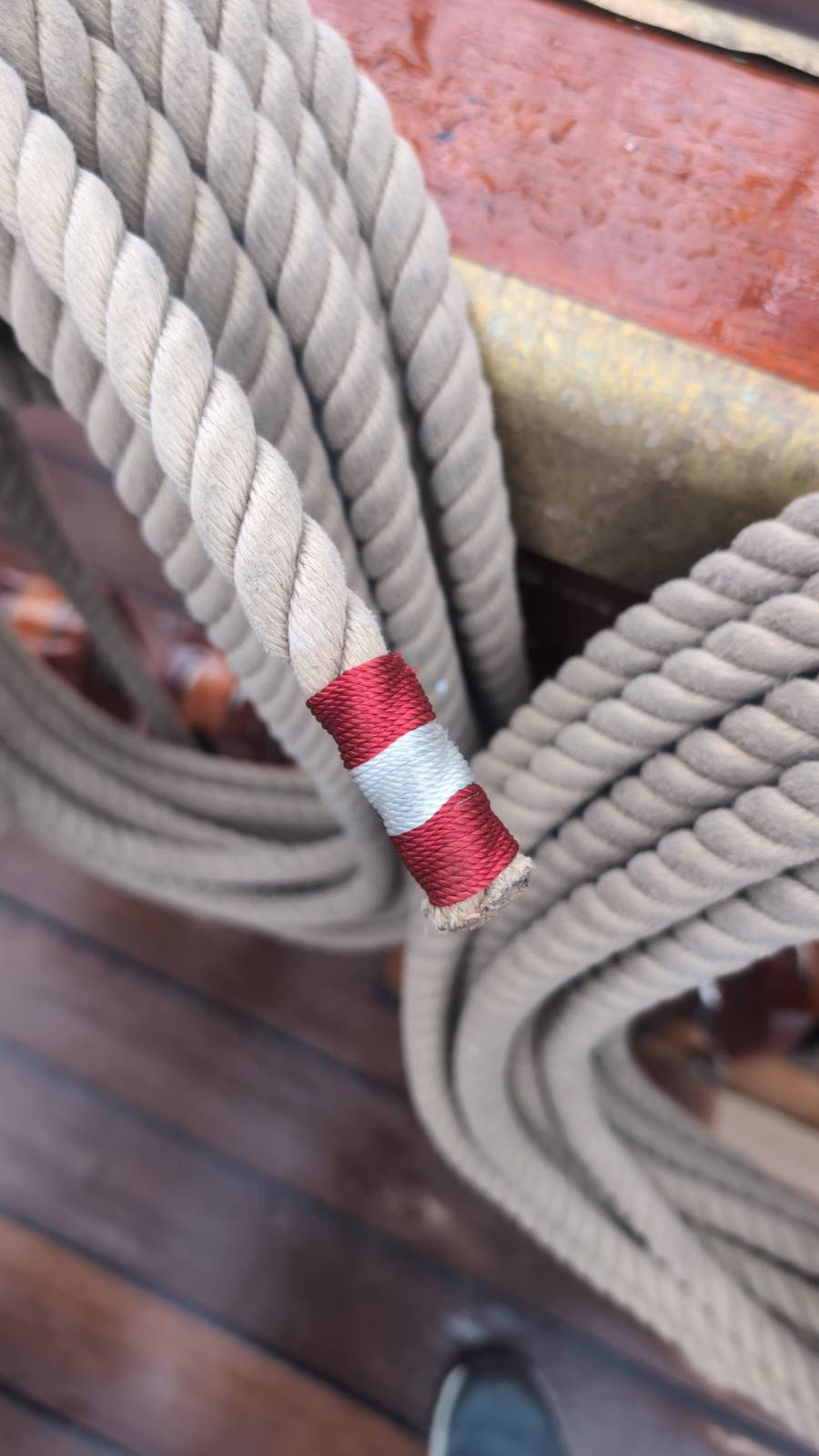
A series of common whipping knots used to make the flag of Peru on the BAP Unión

== See also ==
- List of knots
- Ropework
