= Richard Benkin =

American journalist

- Born: United States
- Education: University of Michigan (PhD)
- Occupation(s): Journalist, human rights activist, author, lecturer
- Employer(s): Independent; formerly Lexington Nursing & Rehabilitation Center
- Notable work: Advocacy for Salah Uddin Shoaib Choudhury; A Quiet Case of Ethnic Cleansing
- Awards: Special Congressional Recognition (2005)
- Website: interfaithstrength.com

Richard Benkin is an American human rights activist, journalist, writer and lecturer. He has been a member of Folks Magazine's editorial board since August 2011.

== Career ==
Lexington Nursing & Rehabilitation Center

Dr. Richard Benkin ran the Lexington Nursing & Rehabilitation Center in Lexington, Illinois. In January 2000, Michael Berens of The Chicago Tribune said that, " Benkin, the 48-year-old administrator of the facility as well as a part owner, was accused of luring a 27-year-old woman to the rural facility, improperly admitting her into the home, then arranging for a sexual encounter, according to records released Wednesday by the state Department of Professional Regulation."

The Lexington Nursing & Rehabilitation Center was shut in an emergency operation by authorities in March 2000 after a series of articles by The Chicago Tribune. The Associated Press cited, "John Lumpkin, Illinois public health director, said the suspension of the Lexington Nursing and Rehabilitation Center’s license was necessary because of an ``immediate and serious threat″ to residents’ safety."

The nursing home was closed, "amid allegations that homeless drug addicts terrorized staff and elderly residents after arriving from Chicago to fill beds at the financially troubled center."

Health Department spokesman Thomas Schafer said one staff member was attacked by a drug patient and another worker was injured when a patient jumped on the worker’s back.

In another instance, one of the drug patients tried to slash the throat of another after they returned from drinking at a bar, Lexington Police Chief Spencer Johansen said.

=== Human rights activities ===
Benkin participated in efforts to release Bangladeshi journalist Salah Uddin Shoaib Choudhury, who was imprisoned after writing articles warning about the rise of Islamic radicals, and urging Bangladesh to recognize Israel. Benkin, like Choudhury, is an advisory board member of Islam-Israel Fellowship. The two together formed Interfaith Strength to disseminate information about Choudhury's case.

Choudhury was released from prison in 2004. Benkin said, "In almost seven years since [he] was arrested, the Bangladeshi government has not brought forward one scintilla of credible evidence against this journalist; and its sole 'witness' continues to not show up."

In September 2005, the Bangladeshi government asked Benkin if he would help build a "positive image" of Bangladesh in the United States. Wanting to help the Bangladeshi people and advance US-Bangladesh relations, Benkin was advised to accept the challenge because Bangladesh had recently taken positive steps. After one month, however, a frustrated Benkin resigned from the role after serious disagreements with the Bangladeshi government.

On February 15, 2007, House Resolution 64 passed the United States House Committee on Foreign Affairs without opposition. The resolution called on the government of Bangladesh to drop all charges against Choudhury

Congressman Mark Kirk presented a Certificate of Special Congressional Recognition to Benkin on May 22, 2005 at Benkin's synagogue, Temple Chai in Long Grove. This was awarded for Benkin's "commitment and dedication to preserving human rights in the case of Shoaib Choudhury.

Benkin has documented the present-day Hindu genocide happening in Bangladesh. In 2012, he published, A Quiet Case of Ethnic Cleansing: The Murder of Bangladesh's Hindus. He believes the best way to stop Islamic militant gang rape of Hindu women and girls, killing of Hindu people, and destruction of Hindu temples is by boycotting the purchase of garments made in Bangladesh and protest allowing Bangladesh to participate in peacekeeping.

=== Views ===
In 2008 Benkin compared Islamist militants in Kashmir to Palestinian militants, stating that Kashmir is a transitory goal in the Islamist goal to control India:

"Kashmir is South Asia’s West Bank. Just as Pakistan and its Islamist allies ultimately seek to turn all of India into an Islamic state; so, too, the Arabs have tried again and again to destroy the Israel and even had that as their stated policy. After their colossal failure to do so in 1967, they tried once more to invade Israel with national armies only to fail again. So they changed tactics and stopped talking about their ultimate goal. Instead they focused on “the occupation” (West Bank and Gaza). Their real aim-to destroy Israel and turn it into an Islamic state-never changed. This tactic successfully distracted a gullible Europe which supported Arab calls for their temporary goal. Similarly, South Asian Islamists still want more than Kashmir. Kashmir, like the West Bank, is a transitory goal, but a critical one."

== Awards and recognitions ==
- Special US Congressional Recognition, 2005
- Nominated for 2006 Lorenzo Natali Prize for journalism
- Special Recognition 2007, Bangladesh Editors Forum
- Special Recognition 2007, Bangladesh Minority Lawyers Association

== Publications ==
- The Social and Cultural Development of Jewish Communities in Eastern Europe, 1976 Doctoral Dissertation, University of Michigan Press
- The Battle Beneath Jerusalem (Dhaka Press, 2009)
- Our Fight for Freedom: The Story of a Falsely Imprisoned Muslim and one Jews’s Fight to Free Him
- A Quiet Case of Ethnic Cleansing (monograph on Bangladeshi Hindus), published in Toronto and Mumbai, 2008
- Sociology: A Way of Seeing, Wadsworth Pub Co (July 1981) ISBN 978-0-534-00929-8
