= Thomas Burberry =

British businessman

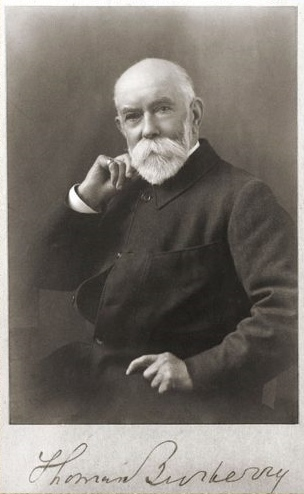
- Born: 27 August 1835; Brockham Green, Surrey, England
- Died: 4 April 1926 (aged 90); Hook, Hampshire, England
- Occupations: Outfitter; Inventor; Entrepreneur
- Known for: Burberry; Inventor of gabardine
- Children: 6

Thomas Burberry (27 August 1835 – 4 April 1926) was an English fashion designer, and the founder of international chain Burberry, one of Britain's largest branded-clothing businesses. He is also known as the inventor of gabardine.

== Early life and career beginnings ==
Born at Brockham Green near Dorking in Surrey, and educated at Brockham Green Village School, Thomas Burberry was apprenticed to a local draper's shop before he opened his outfitting business in Basingstoke in 1856. During this time, Basingstoke was just a small town with a population of only 4,500 people. Initially, his designs were inspired by everyday clothing worn by commoners. However later, Burberry began to experiment with the development of materials and clothing that could be used for outdoor activities such as fishing and hunting.

His main interest was developing waterproof clothing as well as a wider range of products. To do so, he partnered with British cotton manufacturers, and aimed to provide weatherproof textiles that would appeal to the growing middle-class and countryside.

== Career ==
Burberry's involvement in the development of waterproof sportsman clothing was showing to be a great success as his business was expanding rapidly. According to the census of 1871, Burberry was employing over 70 people. By 1878, he founded a larger factory, which focused on wholesale manufacturing and 'ready to wear' clothing, which employed over 200 workers by 1881.

Burberry recognized the need for promotion and publicity and ensured that Lord Kitchener and Lord Baden-Powell both wore his weatherproofs. By these means he expanded his business into one of the United Kingdom's largest branded clothing businesses.

In 1879, Burberry made the revolutionary discovery of gabardine: a tough, tightly-woven and water-resistant fabric made from Egyptian cotton through an innovative process, which attracted positive reviews at the International Health Exhibition in South Kensington and was patented in 1888. This discovery led Burberry to become a world-known name. He was featured in the trade journal Men's Wear in June 1904, where the new fabric was described as being resistant to hot and cold winds, rains and thorns, and would make an ideal weatherproof coat.

With the success of gabardine, Burberry was able to order his son, Arthur, to start placing orders from the elites at the Jermyn Street Hotel, which ultimately led to the opening of Burberry's flagship store at 30 Haymarket. By 1891, it became a wholesale store, with popular pieces such as the "Walking Burberry".

Burberry’s gabardine fabric was not just used by elites, but by explorers. In 1893, Norwegian polar explorer and Nobel Peace Prize winner, Fridtjof Nansen, became the first explorer to use gabardine on his trip to the Arctic Circle. British explorer Sir Ernest Shackleton wore Burberry gabardine for a total of three expeditions in the early 20th century, including the famous Endurance Expedition.

=== Developing the trench coat ===
In 1900, Burberry was approached by the British War Office, and was asked to design a coat to replace the military's current heavy coats. This request led Burberry to create the famous gabardine trench coat: "a lightweight cotton raincoat with a deep back yoke, epaulets, buckled cuff straps, a button-down storm flap on one shoulder, storm pockets, and D-ring belt clasps for the attachment of military gear". The coat became a staple product for World War I Soldiers, and eventually, became a staple product in regular civilian life as well. It became the main element of Burberry style, and continues to be present in media today. The trench coat was worn by Humphrey Bogart, in Casablanca, and Audrey Hepburn, in Breakfast at Tiffany's, contributing to its fame as a style icon seen throughout the world.

== Retirement and death ==
Burberry retired to Abbot's Court near Weymouth, Dorset, in 1917. He used his excess time to focus on religious and humanitarian beliefs. He focused on healthy living, which influenced him throughout his career by making clothes for soldiers and sportsman. He was a teetotaller and campaigned against tobacco smoking. He was also a devout Baptist who liked to hold prayer meetings every morning.

After witnessing the transition of his company from a small store to a public company, Burberry, in 1920, Thomas Burberry peacefully died at his home at Hook near Basingstoke in 1926, aged 90.

== Family ==
He married twice, first to Catherine Hannah Newman and second to Mary Marshall. He had two sons and four daughters by his first marriage.

== Portrayal in film ==
On 1 November 2016, Burberry released The Tale of Thomas Burberry, a short film inspired by Thomas Burberry’s life and achievements, reimagining key events from the brand’s history. Filmed in the style of a cinematic trailer by Academy Award-winning director Asif Kapadia and written by Academy Award-nominee Matt Charman, it starred actor Domhnall Gleeson as Thomas Burberry.
