= Chief Metropolitan Magistrate Court in Bangladesh =

Chief Metropolitan Magistrate Court is a category of metropolitan magistrate court which is found in the metropolitan cities of Bangladesh. These courts are presided over by the chief metropolitan magistrate as per the Code of Criminal Procedure of 1898. These courts are under the supervisory jurisdiction of the metropolitan sessions judge. The amended form of the Criminal Procedure Code gives the government the power to appoint a Chief Metropolitan Magistrate and other magistrates in a metropolitan area. The provision of recruitment of one or more additional chief metropolitan magistrates is also provided.

== Jurisdiction ==
The chief metropolitan magistrate, with the prior approval of the government, has been given the power:

- To conduct and distribute the business and the practice in the courts of metropolitan magistrates
- To form a bench of metropolitan magistrates;
- To set the time and place of the session of the bench;
- To remove any difference between metropolitan magistrates that may arise during the session, and
- To forward any matter that can be dealt by the district magistrate under his/her subordination.

=== Scope of penalty ===
According to the Metropolitan Police Act, only a criminal case can be brought under the court trial based on a written report of a police officer. The powers of the Metropolitan Magistrate include imprisonment for a maximum of five years, a solitary confinement is authorized by law, fine not exceeding taka 10,000 and the order of whipping.
