= Metropolitan sessions courts in Bangladesh =

Metropolitan sessions courts are a category of sessions court located in the metropolitan cities of Bangladesh. These courts function under the authority of metropolitan sessions judges and deal exclusively with criminal cases. As per the Code of Criminal Procedure, 1908, a sessions court is to be established by the government in every metropolitan city. Initially, two types of courts, the courts of sessions and the courts of magistrates were recognized by the code. The code was amended in 1976 with the introduction of the metropolitan police and came into effect in 1979. This amended ordinance made it essential for the government to establish the separate metropolitan sessions courts for metropolitan areas. Currently, eight metropolitan courts are functioning in Bangladesh.

== Structure ==
Metropolitan courts of sessions are presided over by metropolitan sessions judges. It has started functioning in 1999. Metropolitan sessions courts consist of the following judges:

- metropolitan sessions judges
- additional metropolitan sessions judges
- joint metropolitan sessions judges

== List of metropolitan sessions courts ==
As of 2024, there are eight metropolitan sessions courts, namely:

- Metropolitan Sessions Court, Dhaka
- Metropolitan Sessions Court, Chittagong
- Metropolitan Sessions Court, Khulna
- Metropolitan Sessions Court, Sylhet
- Metropolitan Sessions Court, Rajshahi
- Metropolitan Sessions Court, Barishal
- Metropolitan Sessions Court, Rangpur
- Metropolitan Sessions Court, Gazipur
