= Benken =

Benken may refer to any of the following places:

- Benken, St. Gallen, a town in the Swiss canton of St. Gallen
- Benken, Zürich, a town in the Swiss canton of Zürich
