= Whipping knot =

Binding around the end of a rope to prevent it from fraying

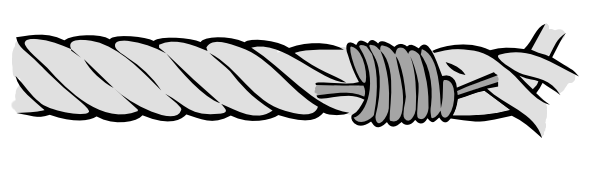
Common whipping knot

A whipping knot or whipping is a binding of marline twine or whipcord around the end of a rope to prevent its natural tendency to fray.

Some whippings are finished cleanly, as by drawing the bitter end of the cordage beneath the whipping itself. Others are tied off or have the end(s) of the twine sewn through the rope. According to The Ashley Book of Knots, "The purpose of a whipping is to prevent the end of a rope from fraying ... A whipping should be, in width, about equal to the diameter of the rope on which it is put ... [Two sailmaker's whippings], a short distance apart, are put in the ends of every reef point, where the constant 'whipping' against the sail makes the wear excessive; this is said to be the source of the name whipping." The other type of stopping knot is a seizing knot.

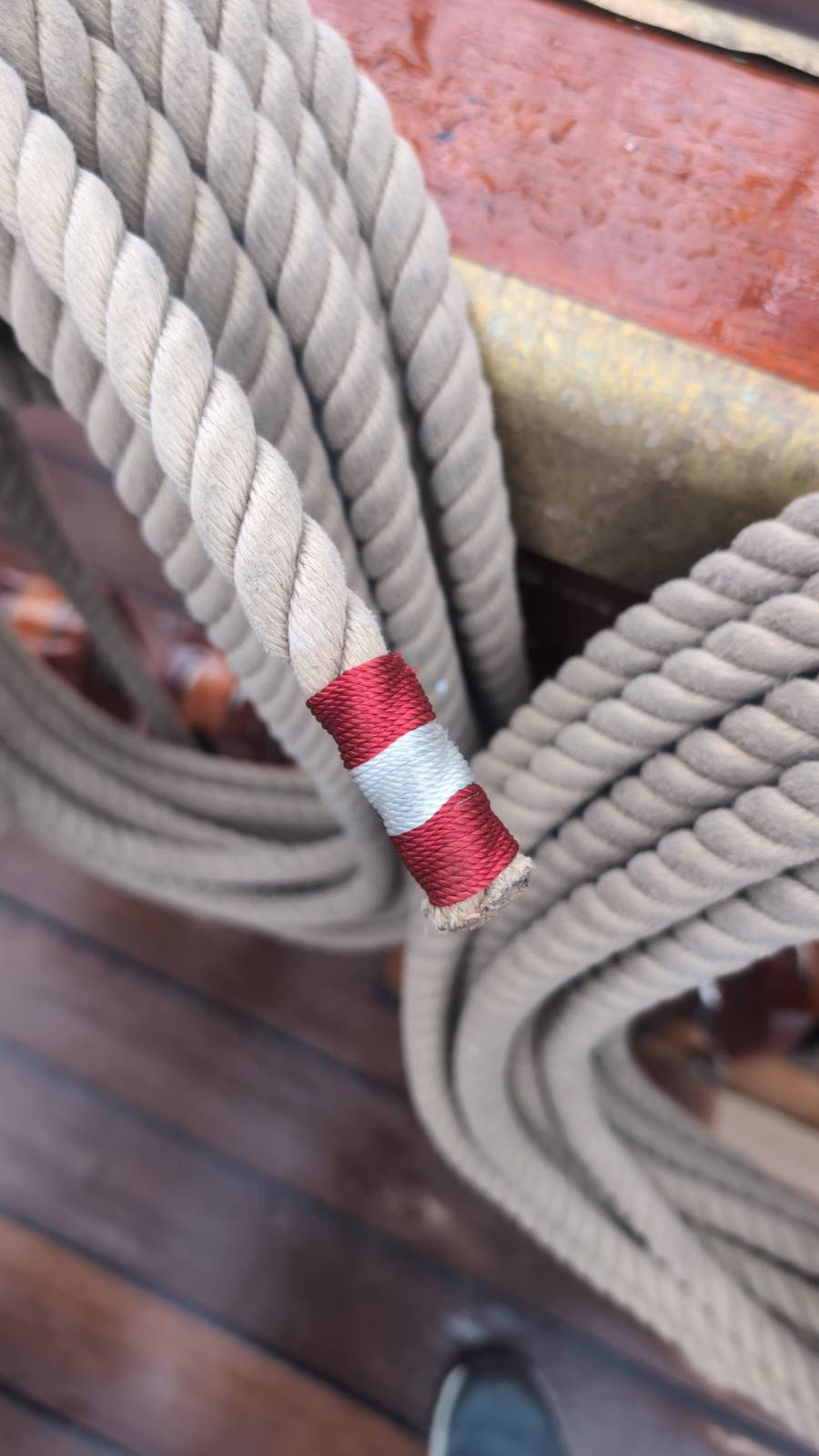
A common whipping knot on the BAP Unión using the colors of the flag of Peru

Whipping is suitable for synthetic and natural stranded and braided lines, including 3-strand rope, 4-strand cable and 8-strand multiplait, as well as concentric and braided constructions.

== Tying ==
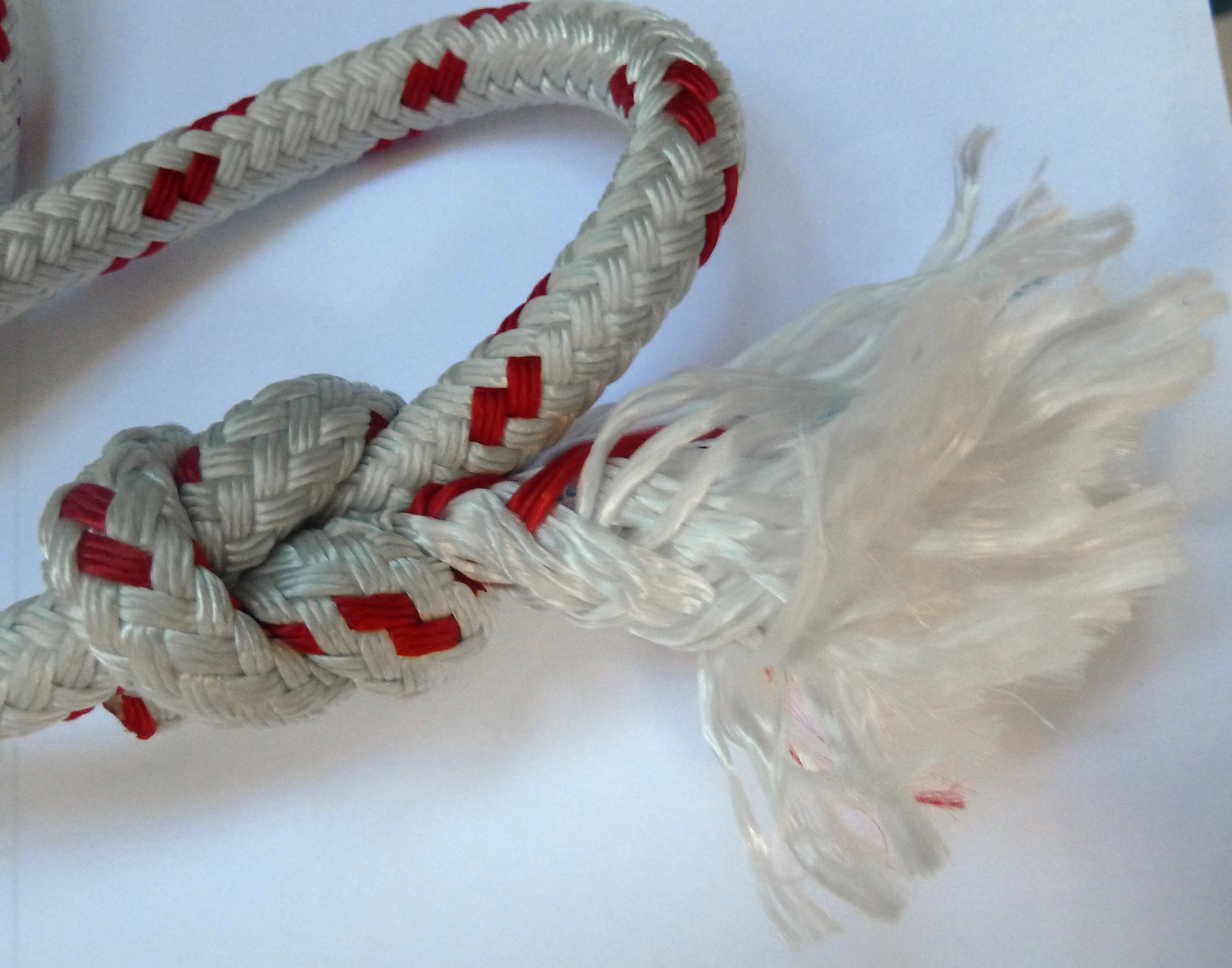
Unsecured end of double braid rope

Multiple turns of twine (sometimes called small stuff for smaller lines) or heavier whipcord (for large diameter cables and ropes) are tightly wrapped around a rope's cut end to prevent its fibers from unlaying.

Usually one end of the whipping cord is looped along the rope to be whipped, and the remaining cord wound tightly over the loop. Finally the loose end of the wound whipping is passed through the loop so that both ends may be drawn securely inside the winding.

Whippings may also be applied by hand or using a palm and needle, and either simply tied off or made neat and permanent by reeving the twine's cut ends into or behind the whipping, sewing them to adjacent strands, or through the rope itself.

In applications where a lot of flexing is expected, the whipping may be impregnated with dilute spar varnish or superglue.

== Types ==
Sailmaker's whipping

West Country whipping

=== French whipping ===
French whipping is merely a series of half hitches. Start with a running eye and finish up with the end tucked back under the last few hitches. The ridge of the hitches should follow the lay of the rope.

— The Ashley Book of Knots

French whipping is a whipping knot that consists of a series of half hitches. It is used to stop unraveling of rope ends as well as to provide a grip over railings.

=== Portuguese whipping ===
Portuguese whipping
- Category: Whipping
- Related: Reef knot
- Typical use: To prevent a rope from fraying

Portuguese whipping is the quickest of all to apply; the ends are merely reef knotted together. It is given by Esparteiro in his Dicionario de Marinharia (Lisboa, 1936).

— The Ashley Book of Knots

The Portuguese whipping is a type of whipping knot. To make it you take the small diameter string and lay one end against the rope. Wrap backwards up the rope until you have both ends side by side, finish by tying a reef knot. This is the quickest of the seizings, but is not as secure as some.

== Alternatives ==
=== Constrictor knot ===
A constrictor knot can be used temporarily to hold the fibres of a cut line until a final whipping can be applied.

=== Tape ===
Several turns of self-adhesive plastic tape may form a temporary or emergency substitute for whipping.

=== Fusion ===
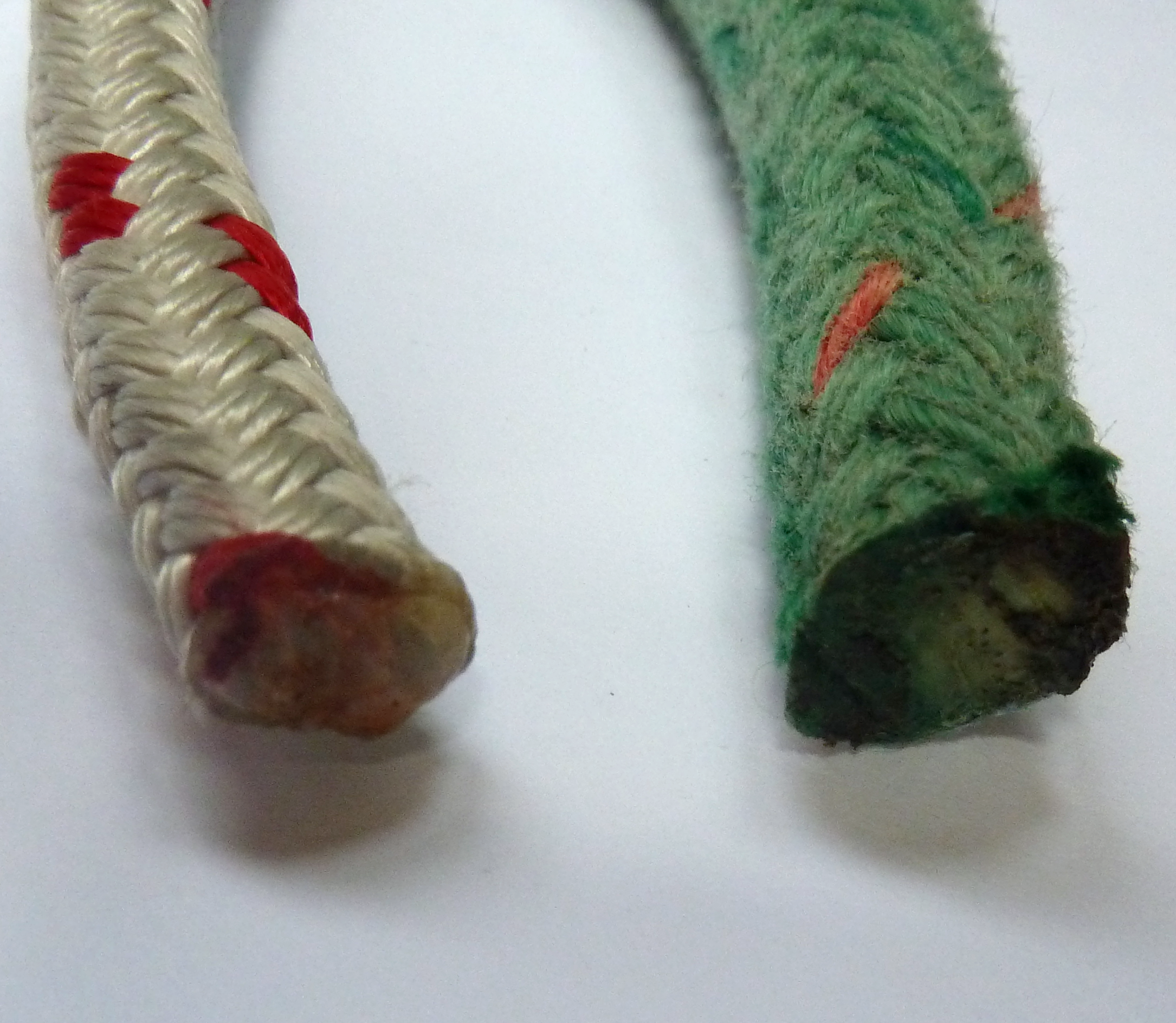
Rope ends heat sealed with electric knife

The ends of some man-made fibers such as Dacron, Nylon, polyethylene, polyester, and polypropylene (but not aramid fibers) may be melted to fuse their fibers to prevent fraying. However, the rope and knotting expert Geoffrey Budworth warns against this practice for boat operators thus:

Sealing rope ends this way is lazy and dangerous. A tugboat operator once sliced the palm of his hand open down to the sinews after the hardened (and obviously sharp) end of a rope that had been heat-sealed pulled through his grasp. There is no substitute for a properly made whipping.

Among the methods of fusing are using an electrically heated rope cutter, heating the blade of a knife, or melting cut ends in a flame. The cool (transparent) part of a butane lighter flame works best.

It is helpful to wrap the end of a line to be fused with several turns of plastic tape first. The finished end will be neater and narrower if a cut is made through the tape.

=== Back splice ===
Back splicing uses a stranded rope's own fibres to prevent fraying. A back splice adds extra thickness to the rope end, preventing it from running through blocks and sheaves. It can also be of benefit when a user needs to feel the end of the rope, as on a bucket lanyard.

=== Liquid ===
Liquid whipping is a semi-permanent rubbery coating applied by dipping the cut end of a line into a container of the product. When the coating sets it is flexible but solid enough to keep the rope together. Liquid whipping can be used on both natural and synthetic fibers.

=== Aglet ===
An aglet is a permanent ending applied mechanically to bind the end of the rope. A typical example is the plastic aglet at the end of a shoelace. Metal aglets may be crimped onto ropes or cables. Aglets may also be made by melting a softer metal to cap the end of the cable.

== See also ==
- Bend knot
- List of knots
- Rope splicing
- Strangle knot
