= Family honor =

Perceived worthiness and respectability

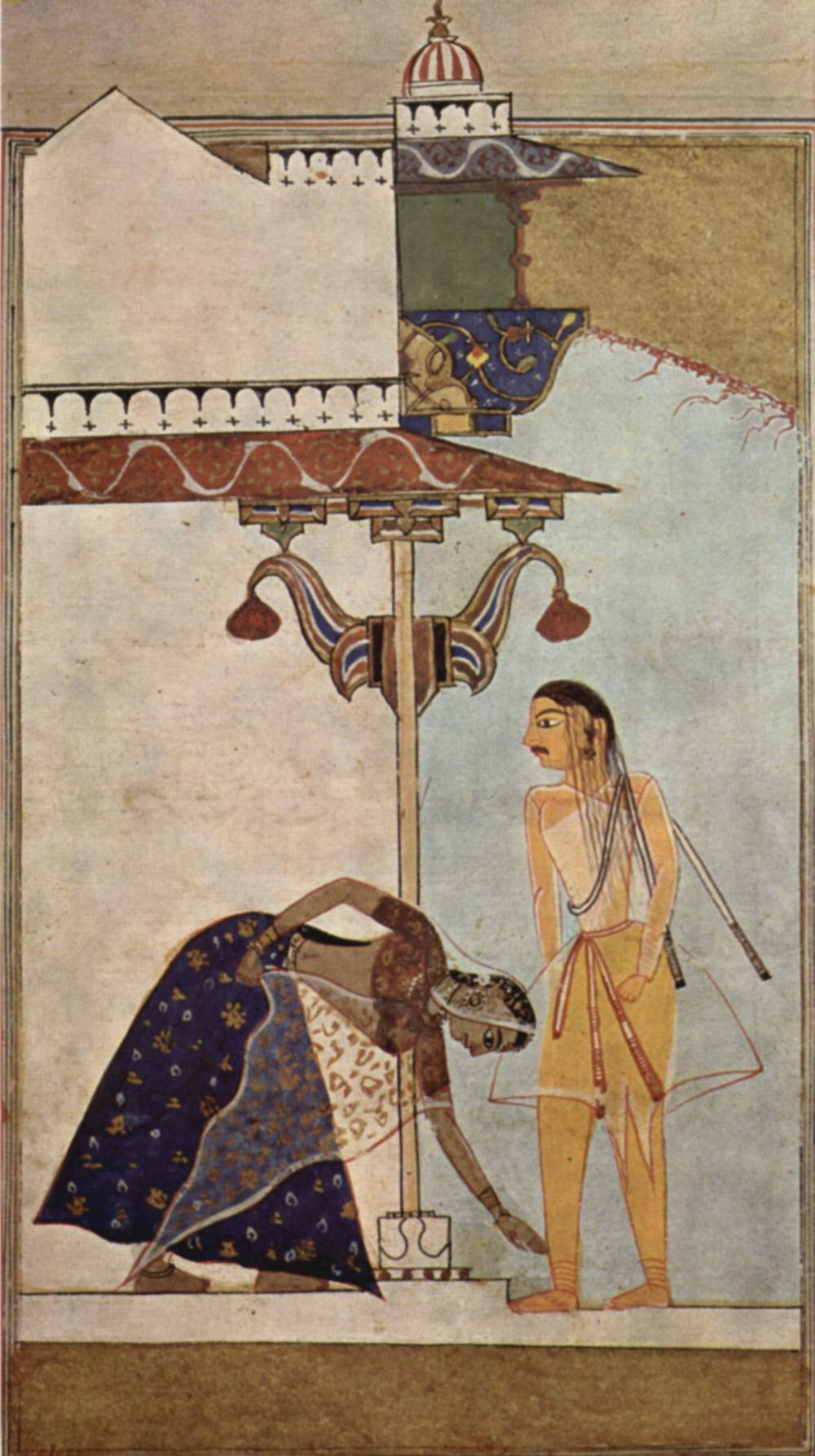
An Indian woman is touching the feet of a man, a tradition to show respect that is embedded in culture. As painted by a west-Indian artist, circa 1530.

Family honor (or honour) is an abstract concept involving the perceived quality of worthiness and respectability that affects the social standing and the self-evaluation of a group of related people, both corporately and individually. The family is viewed as the main source of honor, and the community highly values the relationship between honor and the family. The conduct of family members reflects upon family honor and the way the family perceives itself and is perceived by others. Family honor can be dependent upon many factors. Areas that are affected by family honor include multiple aspects of lifestyle such as social status, religion, clothing, eating, education, job or career, ownership such as real estate, and marriage.

People who live in cultures of honor perceive family as the central institution in their society, and a person's social identity depends largely on their family. Therefore, it is important for these individuals to fulfill expectations of family and society in order to be accepted by their family and experience feelings of belonging to this central institution that they are tied to through birth or marriage. In some cultures, maintaining family honor is perceived as more important than either individual freedom or individual achievement.

The ideology and practice of family honor varies from country to country. Individuals of certain cultures are often unaware or discerning in their understanding of differing cultural traditions. Many fail to grasp the concept of honor as the basis for traditions such as defending one's honor or their family's. Some cultures value family honor more than others. Many times a family's honor may overpower the actions or beliefs of the individual. However, a theme that is common within many traditions is the respecting of elders. Children of the family are to respect their elders who have earned what some call a "badge of 'honor'" representative of their age. Once an individual has lived many years, they have earned this badge of honor and should be shown respect, teaching their young the cultural traditions that have deemed them honorable.

== History ==
An individual is considered as honorable based on their behaviors and characteristics they display that the society deems to be worthy of honor. In addition, honor also entails the aspect of how high of a position an individual holds in relation to the group and how much they are respected by others.

One of the ideals of family honor is social class. Social class can be defined as a group of people categorized into a hierarchy based on the amount of money they have accumulated, how much education they have received, and the amount of power they hold within society, amongst other variables. People who play similar roles within society tend to have similar outlooks. Social standing affects the way in which families form. It determines how and who a person mates with, how they raise their children, and how people relate to one another.

Historically, honor is a quality ascribed to an individual in two ways: either by obtaining it through their birth into an honorable family or being assigned as honorable by powerful people who hold higher status in the society. An individual's parental lineage, is the traditional source for their honor. Because honor is passed through paternal lineage in most patrilineal cultures, these societies historically considered having sons as a source of pride and honor. For example, in the Moroccan culture, it is still a preference among women to have sons instead of daughters. Morocco is a typical patrilineal society in which the son has a more important function for the family such as the son supports his parents once they have aged compared to the daughter who will marry into a different group becoming a loss to the family. In such societies men also hold more sexual rights compared to women besides the supportive role men obtain from caring for their aging parents. Women in these societies are perceived as threats to family honor.

Within cultures, honor is an important and highly esteemed theme. It can be maintained through living up to one's word and promises, providing for the family, and keeping a certain social status. Honor can be affected by women and men through ways in which a woman can shame her family through disapproved actions, and a man heightens his family's honorable status. Ensuing constant pressure to uphold her family's honor, a woman can suffer psychological and social damage.

=== Gender roles ===
The different effects honor instills upon women and men can be seen in the ancient world, where women and men played contrasting roles in society. Men displayed their honorable roles in public while women were restricted to the limitations of their households. While in public, women were required to avoid conversations with estranged men while only visiting places frequented by women. In the present Islamic culture, men hold a higher social status, but they also carry more responsibility in caring and providing for their family. If a man is single or childless his place in society does not waver or become lower. A woman should have a family whom she stays faithful to and respectful towards at all times. A man's actions will not greatly affect or hurt his family's standing like a woman's actions would. Women are perceived as vulnerable individuals who must be kept safe at all times. This aspect of a woman's characterization comes from her fertility and role within her family.

Societies in which "family honor" is considered highly important generally place a correspondingly high degree of restriction of the freedom of women. In these cultures, a family may defend its honor, or may seek reparation or revenge if the family honor is perceived to have been abused or treated with disrespect. In Ancient Rome, sexual activity of married women outside of their marriage was seen as dishonor to the family and it was legal for men to kill their wives or married daughters that shamed the family through adultery. Reasoning for the designation of women to private and/or nonmale areas comes from the ancient tradition of a woman's place in the world. Women are not seen as independent individuals, but rather extensions of their male counterparts' identity and honor.

=== Family honor within society ===
Because the approval of honor is dependent upon the recognition of others, during ancient times individuals worked hard for the approval of their peers within their societal cultures. This meant that individuals were more likely to behave like their honorable counterparts. Groups reinforced what it meant to be honorable through various expected behaviors and goals placed amongst individual members. This discouraged members from any negative activity that may have adversely affected a group or family's honor. In the event that the leader of the group promoted actions that did not appear to be honorable on a larger societal scale, the leader then offered some explanation defending their actions which lead to the preservation of what they defined as honor and their traditions forever.

In Ancient Rome, chastity and loyalty of members of a family was an important factor contributing to family honor in addition to social standing and accomplishments of that family. For example, if a married woman committed adultery, her father had the legal right to kill her whereas her husband was required to divorce her. If the husband chose not to divorce his wife, he would jeopardize his honor and be labeled as a pimp.

=== In opposition to freedom ===
In some cultures with strong principles of family honor, offspring are not free to choose a partner for themselves but may instead be expected to enter into an arranged marriage or if the offspring resists, into a forced marriage or child marriage.

The use of violence may be collective in its character, where many relatives act together. The roles of women and men in this type of honor culture varies between persecutors and the oppressed, for instance a son in a family may be forced to enter into an arranged marriage by his older relatives while controlling his sisters.

== Family honor within different cultures ==
Honor cultures exist throughout the world but are more common among peoples from regions stretching from North Africa via the Middle East, Central Asia and to the Indian subcontinent. Examples of these countries are Afghanistan, Albania, Eritrea, Iraq, Kurdistan, Libya, Palestine, Pakistan and Somalia. Family honour is also an important part of Latin American culture.

=== Middle East and Africa ===
The aspects of family honor mentioned above differ throughout varying cultures and countries. Family honor in the Bedouin and other Middle Eastern cultures consists of interdependent forms of ird and sharaf. Ird is the honor of a woman she is born with which involves her chastity and continence whereas sharaf is the honor code for men which depends on ird of women in the family. Due to its connection to ird, sharaf includes protecting ird of the family members. The adherence to these gender-specific honor codes is important to keep the respectability and sexual honors of the family, particularly men, known as namus. For example, the sexual relationships of a woman are seen in these societies to make her impure and of lesser value, which affects her eligibility for marriage. Public knowledge and gossip about sexual impurity or adultery are proposed to be the main reasons that loss of family honor can bring shame to the family. Preservation of family honor is not only important for respectability of family members in society but also affects the fate of all family members. To protect family honor and dignity, families may resort in killing the woman who is involved in the dishonorable act. In an associated context, to protect the purity and chastity of young girls, families may decide to practice female genital mutilation, a practice that removes or damages female genital organs to assure that sex will not be pleasurable. A mutilated woman is changed so that she has no desire to engage in sexual activity that may undermine the family's honor.

An example of this can be seen in Sierra Leone, Africa where young girls are mutilated every year. The number of girls mutilated in Africa per year has risen to 3 million. Rugiatu Turay, founder of the Amazonian Initiative Movement, protects young girls from being circumcised by other women in secret societies like Sande and other female practitioners who still engage in the ceremonial tradition today. Girls as young as the age of five assist in the mutilation of other young girls in the country. At the age of 12, Turay was snatched by female family members, held down and had her clitoris cut off with a knife. She was beaten, forced to walk, and had hot pepper water poured in her eyes. As she was mutilated, the women sang, danced, and clap ceremoniously. According to these women, Turay had become a woman. However, females are generally mutilated under the age of 15. Girls who are trained to assist in this ceremony are trained as young as five years old. Turay has convinced 400 practitioners to stop the practice of female mutilation, but 97 million females have been mutilated within the country and the numbers remain constant, even increasing. The practice has been enforced by politicians within the country and locals refer to the practice as a ceremony that initiates womanhood, prepares females for marriage, and restricts their sexual conduct.

==== Turkey ====
Family honor is a highly valued concept known as namus in Turkey and it is linked to female modesty, chastity, and family reputation among other families, as well as loyalty.

An ideology of preserving family honor is deeply rooted is society and is not affected by high levels of education. Many women in Turkey are well educated but still are expected to be modest and sexually chaste in order to preserve the perceived honor of their families. If a family's honor is perceived to be breached, it can bring social shame to the entire family. In such cases, traditionally the family would decide the fate of the woman accused of dishonoring her family. This might involve forcing the young woman into a shotgun wedding, while in extreme cases a young male in the family was given the duty to cleanse the family name through an honor killing. With recent changes to criminal law that removed reduced sentences for honor killings, women that are accused of bringing shame to the family are sometimes forced to commit honor suicides by their families, especially in the predominantly Kurdish South-East regions, a region that greatly values traditions. Families who do not want their sons to face possible incrimination have encouraged their daughters to commit suicide. The number of female suicides over the years has increased greatly. Stories have surfaced revealing girls who are given tools with which to kill themselves such as rope to hang themselves, poisons to drink, or a gun to shoot themselves. Some murders have also been disguised as suicides in order to protect family members. Female family members are not the only ones that may be punished to preserve family honor. It is proposed that the death of a male homosexual physics student, Ahmet Yildiz, was an honor killing.

Members of the Republican People Party have stated that in the six months preceding Hatice Firat's death a woman had been killed every day because of domestic violence.

=== South Asia ===
Similar to the South African and Turkish culture, family is a central value for Asian societies. Asian families are usually multi-generational, patriarchal and self-sufficient structures strongly bound to traditions. For instance, in India touching feet of relatives and elderly is a ritual to express respect and submission. However, family honor entails different components depending on the continental region. For example, family honor is strongly linked to female chastity in Afghanistan, Pakistan, and India in a similar fashion to Middle Eastern and Mediterranean societies. Whereas men threaten family honor by extreme actions such as murder and addiction, females may dishonor family by leaving the house too often or having unnecessary conversations with men. Sikh women need to be modest and reserved to be considered honorable; even rape is seen as a major insult to family honor. Cultures near the Middle East also consider involuntary sexual assaults dishonorable and shameful.

=== East Asia ===
Contrastingly in other Continental Asian culture, East Asian family honor depends on other factors such as success in education. Academic success of a student is seen as a source of pride and honor for traditional East Asian families. Therefore, both the East Asian student and the parents had to marshal resources and work diligently to curtail the likelihood of academic failure in order to avoid bringing shame to the family. In the past, honor in East Asia was also linked to success in the military and the battlefield. In Feudal Japan, for example, ritualized suicide practices such as harakiri were committed by Japanese samurai for centuries in the event of a defeat in battle. Instead of being captured or living with the shame of defeat, harakiri was committed in order to preserve the honor of their families.

=== Europe ===
In Europe, similar to traditional practices in South Africa, honor relates to different concepts depending on the geographic area; whereas honor is strongly linked to family reputation in the Mediterranean countries, in Northern Europe it has a more individualized meaning that is focused on personal accomplishments and qualities. Similar to gender-specific family honor codes in the Middle East, Mediterranean nations also traditionally exhibit such codes; women are seen as honorable by their chastity whereas men are seen as honorable by their productivity, toughness, and by protecting the honor of the women. In Italy, infidelity of women was seen dishonorable, thus crimes of passion were classified as second-degree murders until the 1970s. Although Western and Northern European nations traditionally have a more individualistic approach to honor, there have been an increase in honor killings or crimes of passion within their borders by immigrant populations residing in these countries. The European culture also served as a basis for American traditions of honor as well.

In mainly Muslim Kosovo, the impact on family honor of admitting one has been raped, has discouraged some women from applying for compensation as victims of atrocities committed during the 1998–99 war with Serbia.

==== Denmark ====
In Denmark, the migration authority published that 24% of immigrants of non-Western heritage and their offspring of ages 18–29 were limited in their choice of partner by their relatives. The report showed a higher incidence for women than men and in areas with high concentrations of migrants, 59% were limited in choice of partner. Of migrant women who lived in high-concentration areas, fewer of those in education or employment were limited. Of migrant women who live in areas with a low share of migrants, 22% were limited in partner choice. It was also shown that migrant youth are more limited if their social circles only comprises other migrants when it came to choosing a partner.

==== Norway ====
In 2018, an investigation into court cases involving domestic violence against children showed that 47% of the cases involved parents who were both born abroad. According to a researcher at Norwegian Police University College the over-representation was due to cultural (honor culture) and legal differences in Norway and foreign countries.

==== Sweden ====
The Swedish National Police Board and the Swedish Prosecution Authority define honor related crime as crimes against a relative who, according to the perpetrator and his family's point of view has dishonoured the family honor. These crimes are intended to prevent the family honor being damaged or to restore damaged or lost family honor.

The most serious honor related crime is often organised and deliberate. Incidents include torture, forced suicides, forced marriages, rapes, kidnapping, assault, mortal threats, extortion and protecting a criminal.

In a 2009 study by the Swedish Agency for Youth and Civil Society (MUCF), about 70,000 individuals of ages 16–25 stated they could not freely choose whom to marry. The MUCF report is limited to people aged 16–25 and for instance excludes adult women who wish to divorce but are threatened with violence due to family honor. Women in such situations face a greater threat as they are persecuted by both their own extended family and that of the husband. Some women's shelters report that nearly all women who seek refuge with them are fleeing honor based violence. In 2012, the county administrative board of Östergötland got a mandate to coordinate efforts against honor culture-based violence and persecution.

According to an investigation of 3,000 cases by newspaper Göteborgsposten, the most common scenario are girls being supervised and banned from being outside the home after school hours, who are forced to wear an Islamic veil and girls risking a forced marriage. About 80% of the child victims have been physically abused, most frequently with bare hands but also being beaten with belts or cables. In several cases the children have been burned with kitchen utensils or metal objects.

According to John Åberg, the exact number of people who experience honor-related oppression in Sweden is unknown. State statistics put the number around 70,000. Researcher Astrid Schlytter claims, based on research conducted on British and other European populations, that the number of people who experience honor culture (Swedish: hedersförtryck) could be as high as 240,000.

==== United Kingdom ====
In the UK, honor crimes include forced marriage and female genital mutilation and honour based crimes disproportionally affect women from ethnic minorities. The number of honor crimes reported to police increased from 3,335 in 2014 to 5,595 in 2015, an increase of 68%, before a slight drop to 5,105 in 2016. Figures published by the Crown Prosecution Service showed that 256 crimes were referred to the CPS by police in 2016–17, about 5% of the cases reported. Of the 256 referrals, 215 lead to prosecutions which resulted in 122 convictions.

=== North America ===
==== United States ====
According to the United States Department of Justice in 2015 there were about 23–27 honor killings per year in the previous decade in the country.

===== The Old South =====
The Old South took honor particularly seriously. Southerners in the Old South held themselves to their own sets of social codes. An affront to a Southerner's honor, if serious enough, was resolved by a duel. Dueling was originally a European custom, later adopted by the United States. Dueling was not technically legal in the United States, but it was difficult to enforce the laws written against it, especially in the Old South. Usually only men engaged in duels; their opponents were men they perceived to be equals. Public opinion for dueling varied: some thought it was a barbaric and backwards custom, while others believed it was a perfectly legitimate way of dealing with affronts to honor.

=== Hispanic countries and culture ===
Looking at the Hispanic community, similar to many of the countries mentioned above, elders are seen as wise and are to be shown respect from other family members. Family members turn to elders for help regularly, and when a family member falls ill wisdom on what should be done to care for the ill family member is searched for within the elders of the family.

Men are the dominant figures within their households and embody a decisive, authoritative role. Contrary to popular belief, women hold as much weight within their homes as their husbands. They are the matriarchs of the family, and the family's health and stability relies on the mother. Although they need to be protected, women are cherished within their families as important figures.

Hispanic families strongly display their emotions towards one another. Family members show that they care and love one another through taking care of each other. They search for reinforcement and support within their own homes more often than they would in today's society. The Hispanic culture has what is called Curanderismo. This is a system in which families consult the help of a religious figure called a curandero who gives medical, psychological, and social advice. Families make offerings unto the curandero such as money, candle lighting, creating metal or wooden offerings (shaped in the form of the body part in need of healing), etc.

Many families believe that all personal or familial issues should be kept within the home. The Hispanic culture values modesty for all individuals including males and children in addition to females who are historically expected to behave in a modest fashion. Family members that suffer from mental illnesses are reluctant to inform their family members of this information in fear that their family members will criticize them.

In the aspect of childbirth, men are required to wait until after the mother has given birth and dressed in a decent manner to visit his wife and newborn child. Mothers typically accompany the new mother during birth. Much like the American culture, Hispanic women take time to rest after childbirth, but traditionally they returned to heavier labor jobs as opposed to jobs normally held by women within society.

==== Brazil ====
In one country in particular Brazil, the community attempts to divide the upper-class families who are considered honorable from the lower-class families who are seen as a threat to society in Rio de Janeiro. The country defends family honor through the creation of different policies and laws, but this has caused great opposition. Politics has played a major in role in determining the status and meaning of what is considered to be honorable within Brazils' society.

===== Honor of women in Brazil =====
In the late 1800s Viveiros de Castro noted an increase in violations of female honor within Brazil at the turn of the century. Women were expanding their roles throughout society which many believed opened doors for women to be taken advantage of and seduced. Viveiros de Castro believed that women's working in factories was a threat to society and morality. Men believed that the new change in opinion amongst women contributed to this new susceptibility. Many men believed that women believed they were freer than they actually were, and because of this the actions of women led them to lose honor because of their lack of dependency on the male gender. The new century had changed the image of how women were historically perceived and portrayed. Certain individuals, a judge by the name of Nelson Hungria (quoted in Sueann Caulfield's book) specifically, labeled a woman's reserved role as the source of her honor which was lost once she branched out into society losing this reserved quality attributed to women. Because women chose to leave the traditional role of being the homemaker they lost the characterization of being innocent and some assumed they were engaging sexual activities.

Michael Herzfeld, an anthropologist, argued that the idea of women losing their chastity derived from those who wished to explain a woman's new role within society. The idea of women expanding their roles outside of the home in society went against the ideas and morals that were upheld centuries before. In order to defend this morality, many highlighted the customs of the past as something that should have been continuously practiced and enforced even in a new modern era.

Many women were subjected to sexual trials in which they were criticized for being dishonorable. Women during this time were similar to their ancestors. They engaged in practices such as sex before marriage, consenting to unions, and taking on the head role within their homes. However, these acts were perceived in an extremely contrasting manner during this period (after World War I). Because of this, many were uncertain of how they should approach the act of preserving sexual honor.

===== Politics and honor within Brazil =====
Turning to a different aspect of society that intertwined itself with idea of honor, politics played a major role in defining honor within Brazil. The country attempted to define honor while displaying this view of honor along with the country's traditions to others around the world. In September 1920, King Albert and Queen Elisabeth made a trip to Brazil. This trip sparked major controversy from different parties in the country. Many believed the trip was an attempt to "Europeanize" the country. Some viewed the trip as a positive way to show off Brazil the country and its civilization. Others viewed the trip as a negative opportunity in which the culture would attempt to conform to European standards. In doing so, attempts by the upper class would be made to hide Brazil's struggle of poverty which was a main part of its society and culture at the time. With this trip the importance of honor intensified. Before the King and Queen arrived, preparing for the couple included exposing and exercising honor in a manner many believed would promote the division of social classes and international affairs. Those who were responsible for posing as advocates for their country concealed their social class under what was perceived as honorable and behaved as though they themselves were a part of an "honorable" class. One of the aspects they displayed were gender ideologies that played a crucial role in differentiating social classes from one another. Natives desired to portray the country the best way possible. In doing so, they defended their families' traditions and morals and sexual honor.

Towards the end of the 1930s, the definition of honor within Brazilian society has transformed completely. In result, in 1940, a penal code derived definitions of the term honor. Sexual crimes became a breaking of not family honor but "social customs". With the Vargas regime (Dictator Getúlio Vargas who ruled from 1937–1945), came a new form or definition of honor. Many attribute the change in the meaning of honor and a devaluing of its meaning to Vargas' rule. Vargas attributed the aspect of authority to the meaning of honor. Vargas closely tied traditional Brazilian family honor with the aspect of the nation's honor. Through his regime, Vargas intended to create a hierarchy of social, authoritative classes. However, debates over class, and gender in relation to honor and the nation of Brazil continued to take place. Women continued to transform their traditional roles and these changes could not be neglected.

== See also ==
- Blood money
- Duel
- Feud
- Honour
- Honor codes of the Bedouin
- Honor killing
- Izzat (honor)
- Namus
