= Namus =

Arabic word meaning "virtue"

Nāmūs is an Arabic word describing an ethical category in Middle Eastern patriarchal character. Often literally translated as "virtue", it is now more popularly used in a strong gender-specific context of relations within a family described in terms of honor, attention, respect/respectability, and modesty.

== Etymology ==
The Arabic word nāmūs (ناموس) may mean "law", "custom" or "honor" and is ultimately derived from the Ancient Greek word nómos (νόμος), meaning "law, custom".

== Gender ==
Namus has been translated into English from the Turkish language with different meanings. Honor is used to mean namus in the English language translation of Filiz Kardam's 2005 paper on namus cinayetleri (literally namus murders, used mainly in newspapers), but, as Nüket Kardam has written, chastity is a more accurate translation than honor. This is built into the legal system, which permits reduced sentences for honor killings.

According to researcher Robert Ermers, honor means moral reputation. When individuals have a good moral reputation, people in their community are likely to include them. Thus namus means sexual moral reputation. When people possess namus, their friends, neighbors and other community members, believe that they are sexually trustworthy and of integrity. This is a precondition for being included.

When, however, an individual's honour is damaged, e.g. by means of slander, libel, or their own factual moral transgression, this moral reputation is likely to be damaged, with social death as a consequence, which can also extend to family members.

The Turkish language has multiple words to describe related concepts of honor including namus, onur and şeref. Though namus is often understood as feminine sexual virtue or chastity, this definition is only part of current use. The official definition of namus from the dictionary Foundation of Turkish Language is "the attachment of a society to moral rules". The notion of namus is related to sexually deviant behavior and not limited to women: men who are known as rapists are also known as namussuz, as are families that do not respond to rape of a family member.

Women's premarital virginity is still regarded as a matter of honor in some areas. A girl that keeps her virginity is considered trustworthy and reliable, conditions for a successful marriage. These cultural perceptions persist in modern metropolitan areas, as well as in the more traditional areas of the rural countryside. Some old customs continue to endure, such as requiring proof of virginity in the form of blooded sheets, or in some cases by medical examination, even though most people are aware that many virgins (about 50%) do not bleed.

Brides in areas where the stained cloth is part of a ritual are often helped by (female) family members by means of chicken's blood or other means. Although Kemalism has contributed to the rapid modernization of the country in many aspects, traditional sexual mores have proven to be resilient. Even those families who encouraged their daughters to pursue professional careers as teachers, doctors or lawyers maintained the expectation that these women would continue to conduct themselves as "dedicated mothers, and modest housewives", which are important societal ideals.

In some societies, e.g., in Pashtun tribes of Afghanistan, namus goes beyond the basic family and is common for a plarina, a unit of the tribe that has a common ancestral father (e.g. a clan).

=== Violations of namus ===
The namus of an entire family is violated if, for example, an adult daughter is not dressed "appropriately", or if they tolerate a sexual offense without reaction. For example, a family that does not respond when their daughter is raped (or seduced) is namussuz. The appropriate response in some areas is to kill the rapist (or seducer). This task then befalls on the men of the family, and for this reason it is often believed that namus is merely a concern of men, not of women.

Among Pashtuns an encroachment on a family's plot of land also signifies violation of their namus, while in Turkey this would be considered a matter of şeref and the need to respond a matter of gurur (assertiveness). Families that do not respond to such violation are considered cowards.

=== Restoration of namus ===
Family members are vulnerable when one group member commits deviant behavior. If a woman or a man transgresses important moral and sexual norms (a wife, sisters, daughters, brothers, uncles), their common namus is lost in the eyes of the community, following the mechanism of associative stigmatization. The entire family then risks being cast out. They have to cleanse their family's honor in order to prevent exclusion. In some areas this is done by murder or forced suicide, or honor killings.

While the social mechanism of stigma by association is common all over the world, honour killings occur in some regions in the Middle East and adjacent areas. In immigrant societies within western societies, girls and boys face conflicts with their families that are poorly understood; their risks may be underestimated or overestimated.

Contrarily to what is often thought, in cases of rape, the woman is often seen as a victim. She can often convince her family members that she was deceived by a man with false intentions. In such cases, in particular when outsiders hear about the rape incident, families consider that the namus of their whole family has been damaged and to restore it, an honor killing of the rapist is necessary (numbers unknown). When the case is known in the community, and family members do not believe the woman's account and think she had a part in the incident, they may also kill her. Some of the estimated yearly 5,000 female victims are women whose accounts are not believed. A woman in such a position may also commit forced suicide. In Pakistan, acid is often thrown on the victim's face to disfigure her as an alternative to murder.

A family's honor is not damaged by the birth of girls. Yet having many sons contributes to the status of a family. When a family learns that a new female child is expected sex-selective abortion or infanticide may occur, although these are not instances of honour killing but of frustration of not being able to keep up with societal ideals.

== In arts ==
The 1925 Armenian silent film Namus tells the ill fate of two lovers, who were betrothed by their families to each other since childhood, but because of violations of namus, the girl was married by her family members to another person. In 2006 it was restored, digitized and dubbed in French.

Abdullah Goran (1904–1962), the modern Kurdish poet, condemned honour killing in his poem "Berde-nûsêk" ("A Tomb-Stone").

== See also ==
- Izzat (honour)
- Jineology
- History of rape
- Honor killing
- Manoj–Babli honour killing case
- Mesopotamian marriage law
- Culture of honor (Southern United States)
- Honor codes of the Bedouin
- Bedouin systems of justice

== Sources ==
- First Encyclopaedia of Islam: 1913-1936. BRILL. 1993. pp. 844–846. ISBN 90-04-09796-1.
