= Marriage law =

Marriage law by country State recognizes civil marriages only State recognizes both civil and certain religious marriages State recognizes civil marriages; no additional information State recognizes religious marriages only Civil marriages only for foreigners Civil marriages only for non-Muslims

Marriage law is the body of legal specifications and requirements and other laws that regulate the initiation, continuation, and validity of marriages, an aspect of family law, that determine the validity of a marriage, and which vary considerably among countries in terms of what can and cannot be legally recognized by the state.

== Summary table ==
Country/territory	Civil marriages	Religious marriages	Customary marriages (Note: A marriage which takes place in terms of the customs of the community.)	Divorce (see: Divorce law by country)	Same-sex marriages	Polygamous marriages
Afghanistan	Foreigners only	Recognized	—N/a	Legal	Unrecognized	Legal (Note: Men can have up to 4 wives)
Albania	Performed	Recognized	Not recognized	Legal	Unrecognized	Illegal
Algeria	Performed	Recognized	Not recognized	Legal	Unrecognized	Legal
Andorra	Performed	—N/a	Not recognized	Legal	Legal	Illegal
Angola	Performed	Not recognized	Recognized	Legal	Unrecognized	Illegal
Argentina	Performed	Recognized	Not recognized	Legal	Legal	Illegal
Armenia	Performed	Not recognized	Not recognized	Legal	Unrecognized (Note: Foreign same-sex marriages recognized)	Illegal
Australia	Performed	Recognized	Not recognized	Legal	Legal	Illegal
Austria	Performed	Not recognized	Not recognized	Legal	Legal	Illegal
Azerbaijan	Performed	—N/a	Not recognized	Legal	Unrecognized	Illegal
Bahamas	Performed	—N/a	Not recognized	Legal	Unrecognized	Illegal
Bahrain	Foreigners only	Recognized	—N/a	Legal	Unrecognized	Legal
Bangladesh	Performed	Recognized	Recognized	Legal	Illegal	Legal
Belarus	Performed	Not recognized	Not recognized	Legal	Unrecognized	Illegal
Belize	Performed	—N/a	Not recognized	Legal	Unrecognized	Illegal
Bhutan	Performed	—N/a	Recognized	Legal	Unrecognized	Legal
Belgium	Performed	Not recognized	Not recognized	Legal	Legal	Illegal
Benin	Performed	—N/a	Recognized	Legal	Unrecognized	Legal
Bolivia	Performed	Not recognized	Not recognized	Legal	Unrecognized	Illegal
Botswana	Performed	—N/a	Recognized	Legal	Unrecognized	Illegal
Brazil	Performed	Not recognized	Not recognized	Legal	Legal	Illegal
Brunei	Performed	Recognized	Not recognized	Legal	Unrecognized	Legal
Bulgaria	Performed	Not recognized	Not recognized	Legal	Unrecognized	Illegal
Burkina Faso	Performed	—N/a	Recognized	Legal	Unrecognized	Legal (Note: Customary marriages only)
Burundi	Performed	—N/a	—N/a	Legal	Unrecognized	Illegal
Cameroon	Performed	—N/a	Not recognized	Legal	Unrecognized	Legal
Canada	Performed	Recognized	Not recognized	Legal	Legal	Illegal
Central African Republic	Performed	—N/a	—N/a	Legal	Unrecognized	Legal
Chad	Performed	—N/a	—N/a	Legal	Illegal	Legal
Chile	Performed	Not recognized	Not recognized	Legal	Legal	Illegal
China	Performed	Not recognized	Not recognized	Legal	Unrecognized	Illegal
Colombia	Performed	Recognized	Not recognized	Legal	Legal	Illegal
Comoros	Performed	—N/a	—N/a	Legal	Unrecognized	Legal
Croatia	Performed	—N/a	Not recognized	Legal	Unrecognized	Illegal
Cuba	Performed	Not recognized	Not recognized	Legal	Legal	Illegal
Cyprus	Performed	Recognized	Not recognized	Legal	Unrecognized	Illegal
Czech Republic	Performed	—N/a	Not recognized	Legal	Unrecognized	Illegal
Democratic Republic of the Congo	Performed	Recognized	Recognized	Legal	Unrecognized	Illegal
Denmark	Performed	Recognized	Not recognized	Legal	Legal	Illegal
Djibouti	Performed	—N/a	—N/a	Legal	Unrecognized	Legal
Ecuador	Performed	—N/a	Not recognized	Legal	Legal	Illegal
Egypt	Performed	Recognized	Not recognized	Legal	Unrecognized	Legal
Equatorial Guinea	Performed	—N/a	Recognized	Legal	Unrecognized	Legal
Eritrea	Performed	—N/a	Not recognized	Legal	Unrecognized	Illegal
Estonia	Performed	Recognized	Not recognized	Legal	Legal	Illegal
Eswatini	Performed	—N/a	Recognized	Legal	Unrecognized	Legal
Ethiopia	Performed	Recognized	Not recognized	Legal	Unrecognized	Illegal
Fiji	Performed	—N/a	—N/a	Legal	Unrecognized	Illegal
Finland	Performed	Recognized	Not recognized	Legal	Legal	Illegal
France	Performed	Not recognized	Not recognized	Legal	Legal	Illegal
Gabon	Performed	—N/a	—N/a	Legal	Unrecognized	Legal
Gambia	Performed	Recognized	Recognized	Legal	Unrecognized	Legal
Georgia	Performed	—N/a	Not recognized	Legal	Unrecognized	Illegal
Germany	Performed	—N/a	Not recognized	Legal	Legal	Illegal
Ghana	Performed	Recognized	Recognized	Legal	Unrecognized	Legal
Greece	Performed	Recognized	Not recognized	Legal	Legal (Note: Civil marriages only)	Illegal
Guinea	Performed	—N/a	—N/a	Legal	Unrecognized	Legal
Guinea-Bissau	Performed	—N/a	Recognized	Legal	Unrecognized	Legal
Guyana	Performed	—N/a	Not recognized	Legal	Unrecognized	Illegal
Hong Kong	Performed	Recognized	Not recognized	Legal	Unrecognized	Illegal
Hungary	Performed	—N/a	Not recognized	Legal	Unrecognized	Illegal
Iceland	Performed	Recognized	Not recognized	Legal	Legal	Illegal
India	Performed	Recognized	Recognized	Legal	Unrecognized	Muslims only
Indonesia	Non-muslims only	Recognized	Not recognized	Legal	Unrecognized	Legal
Iran	Not performed	Recognized	Not recognized	Legal	Unrecognized	Legal
Iraq	Performed	Recognized	Not recognized	Legal	Unrecognized	Legal
Ireland	Performed	Recognized	Not recognized	Legal	Legal	Illegal
Israel	Not performed	Recognized: Jewish; Muslim; 10 Christian denominations; Druze	Not recognized	Legal	Recognized, Not Performed	Illegal
Italy	Performed	Recognized	Not recognized	Legal	Unrecognized	Illegal
Ivory Coast	Performed	—N/a	—N/a	Legal	Unrecognized	Illegal
Jamaica	Performed	—N/a	Not recognized	Legal	Unrecognized	Illegal
Japan	Performed	Not recognized	Not recognized	Legal	Unrecognized	Illegal
Jordan	Not performed	Recognized	Not recognized	Legal	Unrecognized	Legal
Kazakhstan	Performed	—N/a	Not recognized	Legal	Unrecognized	Legal
Kenya	Performed	Recognized: Christian; Muslim; Hindu	Recognized	Legal	Unrecognized	Legal
Kiribati	Performed	—N/a	Not recognized	Legal	Unrecognized	Illegal
Kosovo	Performed	—N/a	Not recognized	Legal	Unrecognized	Illegal
Kuwait	Foreigners only	Recognized	Not recognized	Legal	Unrecognized	Legal
Laos	Performed	—N/a	Not recognized	Legal	Unrecognized	Illegal
Latvia	Performed	Recognized	Not recognized	Legal	Unrecognized	Illegal
Lebanon	Not performed	Recognized	—N/a	Legal	Unrecognized	Legal
Lesotho	Performed	—N/a	Recognized	Legal	Unrecognized	Legal
Liberia	Performed	Recognized	Recognized	Legal	Unrecognized	Legal
Libya	Not performed	Recognized	Not recognized	Legal	Unrecognized	Muslims only
Liechtenstein	Performed	—N/a	—N/a	Legal	Legal	Illegal
Lithuania	Performed	Recognized	Not recognized	Legal	Unrecognized	Illegal
Luxembourg	Performed	Not recognized	Not recognized	Legal	Legal	Illegal
Madagascar	Performed	—N/a	—N/a	Legal	Unrecognized	Illegal
Malawi	Performed	—N/a	Recognized	Legal	Unrecognized	Legal
Malaysia	Non-muslims only	Recognized	Not recognized	Legal	Unrecognized	Muslims only
Maldives	Performed	—N/a	—N/a	Legal	Unrecognized	Legal
Mali	Performed	Recognized	—N/a	Legal	Unrecognized	Legal
Mauritania	Not performed	Recognized	—N/a	Legal	Unrecognized	Legal
Mauritius	Performed	Recognized	—N/a	Legal	Unrecognized	Illegal
Mexico	Performed	Not recognized	Not recognized	Legal	Legal	Illegal
Monaco	Performed	—N/a	Not recognized	Legal	Unrecognized	Illegal
Mongolia	Performed	—N/a	—N/a	Legal	Illegal	Illegal
Morocco	Performed	Recognized	—N/a	Legal	Unrecognized	Legal
Mozambique	Performed	—N/a	—N/a	Legal	Unrecognized	Legal
Myanmar	Performed	Recognized	Recognized	Legal	Unrecognized	Illegal
Namibia	Performed	Not recognized	Recognized	Legal	Unrecognized	Legal
Nepal	Performed	—N/a	—N/a	Legal	Ambiguous	Illegal
Netherlands	Performed	Not recognized	Not recognized	Legal	Legal (Note: Not performed in Sint Maarten)	Illegal
New Zealand	Performed	Recognized	Not recognized	Legal	Legal	Illegal
Niger	Performed	—N/a	—N/a	Legal	Unrecognized	Legal
Nigeria	Performed	Recognized	Recognized	Legal	Illegal	Legal (all regions)
North Korea	Performed	Not recognized	Not recognized	Legal	Unrecognized	Illegal
Norway	Performed	Recognized	Not recognized	Legal	Legal	Illegal
Oman	Performed	Recognized	—N/a	Legal	Unrecognized	Legal
Pakistan	Performed	Recognized	—N/a	Legal	Unrecognized	Legal
Palestine	Not performed	Recognized	—N/a	Legal	Unrecognized	Legal
Papua New Guinea	Performed	Recognized	Recognized	Legal	Unrecognized	Illegal
Peru	Performed	Not recognized	Not recognized	Legal	Unrecognized	Illegal
Philippines	Performed	Recognized	—N/a	Illegal (except Muslims)	Unrecognized	Muslims only
Poland	Performed	Recognized 10 Christian denominations and Jewish community	Not recognized	Legal	Unrecognized	Illegal
Portugal	Performed	Recognized	—N/a	Legal	Legal	Illegal
Qatar	Not performed	Recognized	—N/a	Legal	Unrecognized	Legal
Republic of Congo	Performed	—N/a	—N/a	Legal	Unrecognized	Legal
Romania	Performed	—N/a	—N/a	Legal	Unrecognized	Illegal
Russia	Performed	Not recognized	Not recognized	Legal	Illegal	Illegal
Rwanda	Performed	Not recognized	Not recognized	Legal	Unrecognized	Illegal
Saudi Arabia	Not performed	Recognized	—N/a	Legal	Unrecognized	Legal
Senegal	Performed	Recognized	Recognized	Legal	Unrecognized	Legal
Sierra Leone	Performed	—N/a	Recognized	Legal	Unrecognized	Legal
Singapore	Performed	Muslim marriages only	Not recognized	Legal	Unrecognized	Muslims only
Slovakia	Performed	Recognized	—N/a	Legal	Unrecognized	Illegal
Slovenia	Performed	—N/a	—N/a	Legal	Legal	Illegal
Solomon Islands	Performed	Recognized	Recognized	Legal	Unrecognized	Legal
Somalia	Performed	—N/a	Recognized	Legal	Unrecognized	Legal
South Africa	Performed	Recognized	Recognized	Legal	Legal	Legal
South Korea	Performed	—N/a	—N/a	Legal	Unrecognized	Illegal
South Sudan	Not performed	Recognized	Recognized	Legal	Unrecognized	Legal
Spain	Performed	Recognized	Not recognized	Legal	Legal	Illegal
Sri Lanka	Performed	Recognized	—N/a	Legal	Unrecognized	Muslims only
Sweden	Performed	Recognized	Not recognized	Legal	Legal	Illegal
Switzerland	Performed	—N/a	—N/a	Legal	Legal	Illegal
Sudan	Performed	Recognized	—N/a	Legal	Unrecognized	Legal
Syria	Performed	Recognized	—N/a	Legal	Unrecognized	Legal
Taiwan	Performed	—N/a	—N/a	Legal	Legal	Illegal
Tanzania	Performed	Recognized (Note: In Tanzania religious marriages are recognized but the separation of the religious marriage is not legally binding and enforceable, the only enforceable dissolution or divorce is that legally recognized under the laws particularly the law of Marriage Act, 1971.)	Recognized	Legal	Unrecognized	Legal
Thailand	Performed	—N/a	—N/a	Legal	Legal	Illegal
Togo	Performed	—N/a	—N/a	Legal	Unrecognized	Legal
Tunisia	Performed	—N/a	—N/a	Legal	Unrecognized	Illegal
Turkey	Performed	Not recognized	Not recognized	Legal	Unrecognized	Illegal
Turkmenistan	Performed	—N/a	—N/a	Legal	Unrecognized	Illegal
Uganda	Performed	Recognized	Recognized	Legal	Unrecognized	Legal
Ukraine	Performed	Not recognized	Not recognized	Legal	Unrecognized	Illegal
United Arab Emirates	Non-muslims only	Recognized	—N/a	Legal	Unrecognized	Legal
United Kingdom	Performed	Recognized	Not recognized	Legal	Legal	Illegal
United States	Performed	—N/a	In some states (see: Common-law marriage in the United States)	Legal	Legal	Illegal
Uruguay	Performed	—N/a	—N/a	Legal	Legal	Illegal
Vanuatu	Performed	Recognized	Recognized	Legal	Unrecognized	—N/a
Vatican City	—N/a	Recognized	Not recognized	Illegal	Unrecognized	Illegal
Venezuela	Performed	—N/a	—N/a	Legal	Unrecognized	Illegal
Vietnam	Performed	—N/a	—N/a	Legal	Unrecognized	Illegal
Yemen	Not performed	Recognized	—N/a	Legal	Unrecognized	Legal
Zambia	Performed	Recognized	Recognized	Legal	Unrecognized	Legal
Zimbabwe	Performed	Recognized	Recognized	Legal	Unrecognized	Legal

== Rights and obligations ==
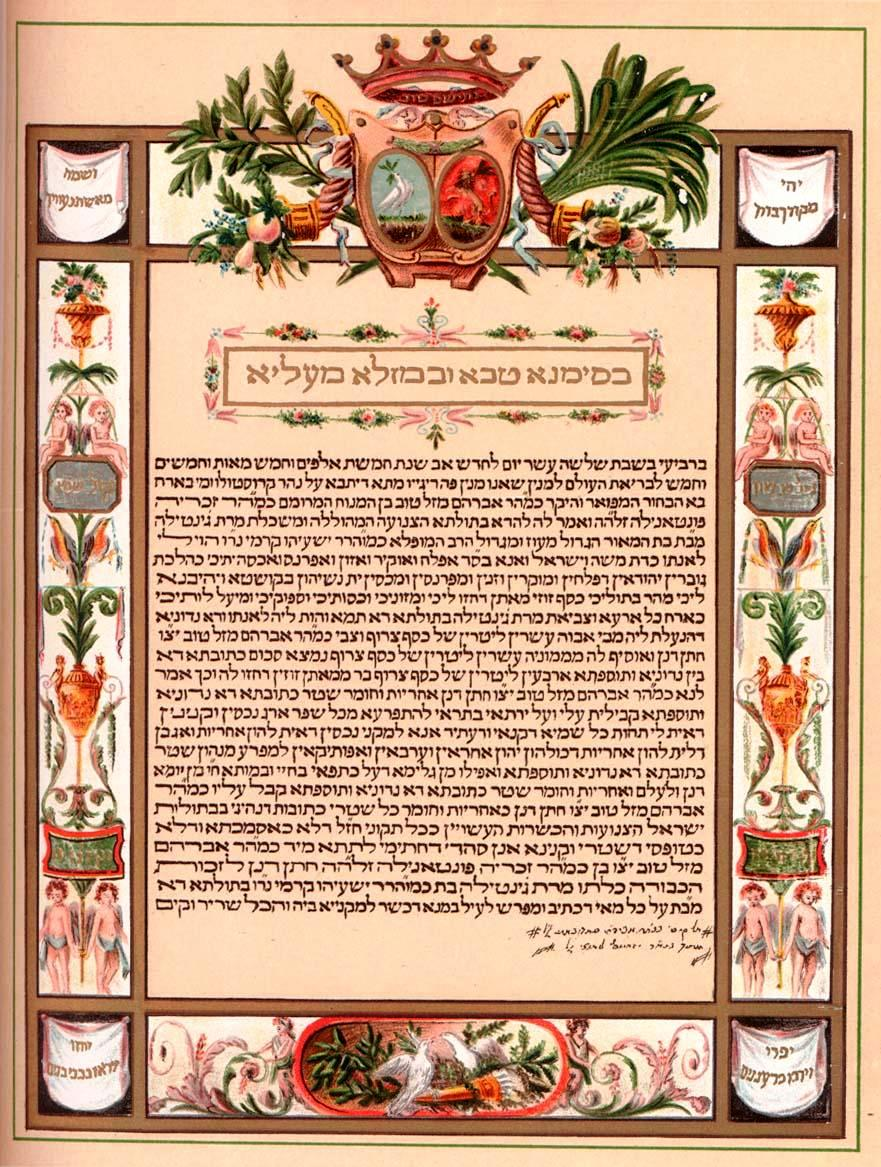
A Ketubah in Aramaic, a Jewish marriage-contract outlining the duties of each partner

...It (Marriage) does not mean that a man has unfettered right to demand and commit sexual intercourse with his wife without her consent or approval, nor it implies that the husband is in dominant position to impose himself upon the wife. The husband cannot indulge in sexual intimacy in such a manner that is discomforting to the wife to her body, mind and soul.—principal judge Dharmesh Sharma, Delhi court ruling, in lieu of marital rape law in India.

A marriage, by definition, bestows rights and obligations on the married parties, and sometimes on relatives as well, being the sole mechanism for the creation of affinal ties (in-laws). Historically, many societies have given sets of rights and obligations to husbands that have been very different from the sets of rights and obligations given to wives. In particular, the control of marital property, inheritance rights, and the right to dictate the activities of children of the marriage have typically been given to male marital partners (for more details see coverture and marital power). However, these practices were curtailed to a great deal in many countries, especially Western countries, in the twentieth century, and more modern statutes tend to define the rights and duties of a spouse without reference to gender. In various marriage laws around the world, however, the husband continues to have authority; for instance, the Civil Code of Iran states at Article 1105: "In relations between husband and wife; the position of the head of the family is the exclusive right of the husband".

These rights and obligations vary considerably among legal systems, societies, and groups within a society, and may include:

- Giving a husband/wife or their family control over a portion of a spouse's labor or property.
- Giving a husband/wife responsibility for a portion of a spouse's debts.
- Giving a husband/wife visitation rights when his/her spouse is incarcerated or hospitalized.
- Giving a husband/wife control over their spouse's affairs when the spouse is incapacitated.
- Establishing the second legal guardian of a parent's child.
- Establishing a joint fund of property for the benefit of children.
- Establishing a relationship between the families of the spouses.
- Making a secure place and establishing social dignity of the spouses.

== Common law marriage ==
Common-law marriages were valid in England until the Clandestine Marriages Act 1753. The act did not apply to Scotland, however, and for many years thereafter couples went north across the border to thwart the ban. On the European continent, common-law marriages were frequent in the Middle Ages, but their legality was abolished in the Roman Catholic countries by the Council of Trent (1545–1563), which required that marriages be celebrated in the presence of a priest and two witnesses.

The Catholic Church forbade clandestine marriage at the Fourth Lateran Council (1215), which required all marriages to be announced in a church by a priest. The Council of Trent (1545–1563) introduced more specific requirements, ruling that future marriages would be valid only if witnessed by the pastor of the parish or the local ordinary (the bishop of the diocese) or by the delegate of one of the said witnesses, the marriage being invalid otherwise, even if witnessed by a Catholic priest. This ruling was not accepted in the newly Protestant nations of Europe, nor by Protestants who lived in Roman Catholic countries or their colonies, nor by Eastern Orthodox Christians.

It is sometimes mistakenly claimed that before the Marriage Act 1753 cohabiting couples would enjoy the protection of a "common-law marriage". In fact, neither the name nor the concept of "common-law marriage" was known at this time. Far from being treated as if they were married, couples known to be cohabiting risked prosecution by the church courts for fornication.

The Marriage Act 1753 also did not apply to Britain's overseas colonies of the time, so common-law marriages continued to be recognized in what became the United States and Canada. Although it is claimed that common-law marriage in the US originated in English common-law, this institution in the United States appears to have originated in the primitive conditions of colonial America where the presence of relatively few clerics or civil officials necessitated a substitute for ceremonial marriage, and the need expanded as the settlers moved into the sparsely populated regions of the West. In the United States, common-law marriages are still recognized in Alabama, Colorado, Iowa, Kansas, Montana, Rhode Island, South Carolina, Texas, Utah, and the District of Columbia (see Common-law marriage in the United States).

All countries in Europe have now abolished "marriage by habit and repute", with Scotland being the last to do so in 2006.

Australia has recognized de facto relationships since the Family Law Act 2009.

In the United States by the second half of the 20th century, common-law marriages were valid in about one-third of the states, absolutely or conditionally (if entered into before a certain statute-defined date).

Israel has common law marriages and are an alternative for couples not wishing to get married via a religious institution or go abroad as Israel has no formal civil marriage. Israeli Common Law Marriages have most rights of that of a traditional married couple.

== Marriage restrictions ==
Marriage is an institution that is historically filled with restrictions. From age to gender, to social status, various restrictions are placed on marriage by communities, religious institutions, legal traditions, and states.

=== Marriage age ===
The minimum age at which a person is able to lawfully marry, and whether parental or other consents are required, vary from country to country. In the U.S. the minimum age for marriage without parental and/or judicial approval is 18 except for Nebraska (19) and Mississippi (21); but most states allow exceptions to the general minimum age in some circumstances (see Marriage age in the United States). In England and Wales the general age at which a person may marry is 18, but 16- or 17-year-olds may get married with their parents' or guardians' consent. If they are unable to obtain this, they can gain consent from the courts, which may be granted by the Magistrates' Courts, or the county or High Court family divisions. In Nigeria, because most marriages are religious ones, there is no strict minimum age for marriage. The issues of age is in most cases determined by respective religious bodies coordinating the marriage as well as the parent's consent. In Sierra Leone, the president has banned marriages for children ages 18 and under and imposed steep fines on adult spouses. In the Philippines, the minimum legal age for marriage is 18, but individuals who are 16 or 17 can marry with parental consent. However, the country has specific provisions for Muslim marriages, which may differ from civil marriage regulations.

=== Gender restrictions ===
Legal, social, and religious restrictions apply in all countries on the genders of the couple.

In response to changing social and political attitudes, some jurisdictions and religious denomination now recognize marriages between people of the same sex. Other jurisdictions have instead "civil unions" or "domestic partnerships", while additional others explicitly prohibit same-sex marriages.

In 1989, Denmark became the first country to legally recognize a relationship for same-sex couples, establishing registered partnerships, which gave those in same-sex relationships "most rights of married heterosexuals, but not the right to adopt or obtain joint custody of a child". In 2001, the Netherlands became the first country in the world to legalize same-sex marriage. As of January 2025, marriage between same-sex couples is legally performed and recognized in 39 countries- the Netherlands, Belgium, Spain, Canada, South Africa, Norway, Sweden, Portugal, Iceland, Argentina, Denmark, Brazil, France, Uruguay, New Zealand, Luxembourg, the United States, Ireland, Colombia, Finland, Malta, Germany, Australia, Austria, Taiwan, Ecuador, the United Kingdom, Costa Rica, Chile, Switzerland, Slovenia, Cuba, Mexico, Andorra, Estonia, Greece, Liechtenstein, and Thailand. As of January 2025, Nepal has recognized same-sex marriage (it is not yet fully recognized with the same rights as opposite-sex marriages, and on June 28, 2023, Supreme Court Justice Til Prasad Shrestha directed the government to establish a "separate register" for "sexual minorities and non-traditional couples" and to "temporarily register their marriages”). Marriage equality in Liechtenstein came into effect on January 1, 2025. The equal marriage bill in Thailand was passed with an overwhelming majority (130–4) on March 27, 2024.

In 2019, Taiwan became the first country in Asia to legalize same-sex marriage. Thailand is expected to become the first country in Southeast Asia to recognize same-sex marriage after a marriage equality bill passed both the House of Representatives and the Senate.

Civil union, civil partnership, domestic partnership, and registered partnership statuses offer varying legal benefits of marriage. As of 21 November 2026, countries that have an alternative form of legal recognition other than marriage on a national level are: Bolivia, Croatia, Cyprus, the Czech Republic, Hungary, Italy, Latvia, Monaco, Montenegro, and San Marino.

==== Further religious conflicts ====
These developments have created a political and religious reaction in some countries, including in England, where the Church of England, after long debate, officially banned blessings of gay couples by Church of England clergy, and in the United States, which continues to experience conflicts, based upon religious grounds.

=== Kinship restrictions ===
Kinship is two people that are related by blood or adoption, such as brother, sister, mother, father, aunt, uncle etc. The U.S. is the only western country with cousin marriage restrictions, no European country prohibits marriage between first cousins. Societies have often placed restrictions on marriage to relatives, though the degree of prohibited relationship varies widely. In most societies, marriage between brothers and sisters has been forbidden, with ancient Egyptian, Hawaiian, and Inca royalty being prominent exceptions. In many societies, marriage between first cousins is preferred, while at the other extreme, the medieval Catholic Church prohibited marriage even between distant cousins.

In the United Kingdom, the Deceased Wife's Sister's Marriage Act 1907 removed the previous prohibition for a man to marry the sister of his deceased wife. In Australia, marriage with an ancestor or descendant is prohibited, as is a marriage between a brother and a sister, whether of whole blood or half-blood and even if the brother or sister has been adopted.

All mainstream religions prohibit some marriages on the basis of the consanguinity (lineal descent) and affinity (kinship by marriage) of the prospective marriage partners, though the standards vary.

=== Social restrictions ===
In the Indian Hindu community, especially in the Brahmin caste, marrying a person of the same gotra was prohibited, since persons belonging to the same gotra are said to have identical patrilineal descent. In ancient India, when gurukuls existed, the shishyas (pupils) were advised against marrying any of guru's children, as shishyas were also considered the guru's children and it would be considered marriage among siblings. However, there were exceptions, including Arjuna's son Abhimanyu's marriage to Uttara, the dance student of Arjuna in Mahabharata. The Hindu Marriage Act, 1955 brought reforms in the area of same-gotra marriages, which were banned prior to the act's passage. Now the Indian constitution allows any consenting adult heterosexual couple (women 18 or older and men 21 or older) from any race, religion, caste, or creed to marry.

Many societies have also adopted other restrictions on whom one can marry, such as prohibitions of marrying persons with the same surname, or persons with the same sacred animal. Anthropologists refer to these sorts of restrictions as exogamy. In South Korea, marriage between people having the same surname and belonging to the same clan was prohibited by the Article 809 of the Korean Civil Code, until the act was determined "non-conforming to the Constitution" in 1997.

Societies have also at times required marriage from within a certain group. Anthropologists refer to these restrictions as endogamy. An example of such restrictions would be a requirement to marry someone from the same tribe. Racist laws adopted by some societies in the past—such as Nazi-era Germany, apartheid-era South Africa, and most of the United States in the nineteenth and the first half of the 20th century—and which prohibited marriage between persons of different races could also be considered examples of endogamy.

In modern Israel, the status of marriage is the same as it was historically under the Ottoman Empire and the British mandate, where civil marriage does not exist and authority for marriage is given by the state solely to the recognized religious denominations (Orthodox Judaism, Islam, Druze, and ten Christian denominations (primarily Orthodox Christianity and Catholicism), but also including the Episcopal Church). Israeli couples who wish to contract a marriage that are not allowed under the auspices of any of these religious denominations (including same-sex marriages, marriages involving Israelis of Jewish descent who are not recognized by the state as Jewish and marriages between non-Jewish Arab citizens of Israel and Israeli Jews) or simply wish to get legally married outside the auspices of one of these institutions cannot do so in Israel itself. However, Israel does recognize civil marriages between Israeli citizens that are contracted abroad, including same-sex marriage, so couples in these situations will often hold a non-binding ceremony in Israel and fly abroad (often to nearby Cyprus) to contract a legal marriage that is then recognized in Israel. In 2023, the Israel Supreme Court ruled couples married by officials virtually, must be recognized by the government. This further reduced barriers to marriage for Israelis seeking civil marriage.

In the U.S., many laws banning interracial marriage, which were state laws, were gradually repealed between 1948 and 1967. The U.S. Supreme Court declared all such laws unconstitutional in the case of Loving v. Virginia in 1967.

=== Polygamy ===
Polygamy is only legal for Muslims Polygamy is legal Polygamy is illegal, but practice is not criminalised Polygamy is illegal and practice criminalised Legal status unknown: In India, Malaysia, Philippines and Singapore polygamy is only legal for Muslims.; In Nigeria and South Africa, polygamous marriages under customary law and for Muslims are legally recognized.; In Mauritius, polygamous unions have no legal recognition. Muslim men may, however, "marry" up to four women, but they do not have the legal status of wives.

Polygamy—being married to more than one spouse—is illegal in most countries. Where polygamous marriages are allowed, it is typically polygyny that is permitted. While accepted by some societies, it is far less common than monogamy.

Polygamy is normally not permitted in most Western countries, although some recognize bona fide polygamous marriages that were performed in other countries. Polygamy is practiced illegally by some groups in the United States and Canada, primarily by certain Mormon fundamentalist sects that separated from the mainstream Latter Day Saints movement after the practice was renounced in 1890.

Many societies, even some with a cultural tradition of polygamy, recognize monogamy as the only valid form of marriage. For example, People's Republic of China shifted from allowing polygamy to supporting only monogamy in the New Marriage Law of 1950 after the Communist Revolution.

In Islam, polygamy is permitted by the Quran (4:3), which states, in a verse setting rules for the adoption of orphans, "If you fear you might fail to give orphan women their ˹due˺ rights ˹if you were to marry them˺, then marry other women of your choice—two, three, or four. But if you are afraid you will fail to maintain justice (between your wives) then ˹content yourselves with˺ one or those ˹bondwomen˺(slaves) in your possession. This way you are less likely to commit injustice (to the orphan girls in your care)".

Africa has the highest rate of polygamy in the world. In India, only Muslims are allowed to practice polygamy.

Polygamy, taking the form of polygyny, is most common in a region known as the "polygamy belt" in West Africa and Central Africa, with the countries estimated to have the highest polygamy prevalence in the world being Burkina Faso, Mali, Gambia, Niger and Nigeria. In the region of sub-Saharan Africa, polygyny is common and deeply rooted in the culture, with 11% of the population of sub-Saharan Africa living in such marriages (25% of the Muslim population and 3% of the Christian population, as of 2019). Polygyny is especially widespread in West Africa, with the countries estimated to have the highest polygyny prevalence in the world as of 2019 being Burkina Faso (36%), Mali (34%) and Gambia (30%). Outside of Africa, the highest prevalence is in Afghanistan, Yemen and Iraq.

=== Medical examination ===
Beginning in the early 20th century, a number of jurisdictions have mandated premarital medical testing or examinations for one or both parties. One of the most commonly mandated was a blood test for syphilis. Between the 1930s and 1950s, most US states passed laws requiring both parties to a marriage to undergo a Wassermann test (or equivalent) for syphilis. If one of the parties was found to have communicable syphilis, they would generally be prevented from marrying until they underwent treatment to resolve the infection. Before the availability of penicillin after World War II, the treatment of syphilis entailed a course of arsenic-based drugs for up to a year or more. These statutes were eventually repealed between the 1970s and 2000s, because they were considered to no longer be a cost-effective public health measure.

In the 1980s and 1990s, many US state legislatures considered laws requiring premarital HIV testing, though only a small number were adopted, and were only briefly active before being repealed. As of 2010, premarital HIV testing is legally mandated in Bahrain, certain provinces of China, Libya, Saudi Arabia, the United Arab Emirates, and Uzbekistan.

== State recognition ==
In many jurisdictions, a civil marriage may take place as part of the religious marriage ceremony, although they are theoretically distinct. In most American states, a wedding must be officiated by the justice of the peace in order for it to be recognized. However, priests, ministers, rabbis, and many other religious authorities can act as viable agents of the state. In some countries, such as France, Spain, Germany, Turkey, Argentina, Japan and Russia, it is necessary to be married by government authority separately from any religious ceremony, with the state ceremony being the legally binding one. In those cases, the marriage is usually legalized before the ceremony. Some jurisdictions allow civil marriages in circumstances which are notably not allowed by particular religions, such as same-sex marriages or civil unions.

In a few jurisdictions, a marriage relationship may also be created by the operation of the law alone, as in common-law marriage, sometimes called "marriage by habit and repute." However, the term "common-law marriage" has wider informal use, and is commonly used to refer to cohabiting couples, regardless of any rights they may have. The institution of common-law marriage, in its original legal meaning, has been abolished in almost all jurisdictions that used to have it, and only survives in a few US states. In several jurisdictions, such as parts of Canada, while the law recognizes unmarried couples for various purposes, such relations are not common-law marriages within the original meaning of this legal concept. (see common-law marriage vs. cohabitation). The informal use of the term "common-law marriage" has given rise to many public misconceptions regarding this legal institution.

The status in the eyes of one authority may not be the same as for another. For example, a marriage may be recognized civilly, but not by a church, and vice versa. Normally a marriage entered into in one country will be recognized in other countries. Sometimes, however, a religious ceremony or a marriage entered into in one country is not recognized by another, such as a same-sex marriage.

In the United States, various states have proposed and enacted changes to their marriage laws. New Jersey introduced bills allowing remote application for marriage licenses and virtual ceremonies using video-conferencing technology. New York has similar proposals, including waiving the 24-hour waiting period for military personnel. New Mexico is considering legislation to amend the minimum age for marriage and expand who can officiate weddings, while South Dakota raised the legal marriage age to 18 without exceptions. Additionally, Utah passed a law protecting interracial marriages explicitly.

At present, South Africa is the only country to legally recognize both polygamy and same-sex marriage, though same-sex couples are excluded from entering into polygamous marriages. While it has been argued that "polygamy offers same-sex marriage advocates a reason to reject the claim that there is a long tradition of defining marriage between one man and one woman", the apparent mutual exclusivity of polygamy and same-sex marriage may reflect a view that "advocates should continue to distance same-sex marriage from plural marriage" even though "polygamy and same-sex marriage may share some common ground".

== International recognition ==
Some countries give legal recognition to marriages performed in another country under the Hague Convention on Marriages (1978). For this to apply, both the country of marriage and the country where recognition is sought need to be convention members.

If the country of marriage is not a member of the Hague Convention on Marriages (1978), then the marriage documents will need to be certified following the Apostille convention. This certification is usually performed in the country of marriage by the embassy of the country whose recognition is sought.

== License ==
A marriage license is a document issued, either by a church or state authority, authorizing a couple to marry. The procedure for obtaining a license varies between jurisdictions and has changed over time.

== Notice ==
In many countries there is a requirement to give notice of an impending marriage to the community so that objections to the marriage can be raised. This practice is also known as a "Banns", coming from Middle English meaning "Proclamation." This custom was in place as a mechanism to necessitate the consent of parents as well as the wider community. Some countries continuing this custom are Ireland (3 months) and India (30 days).

== Formality ==
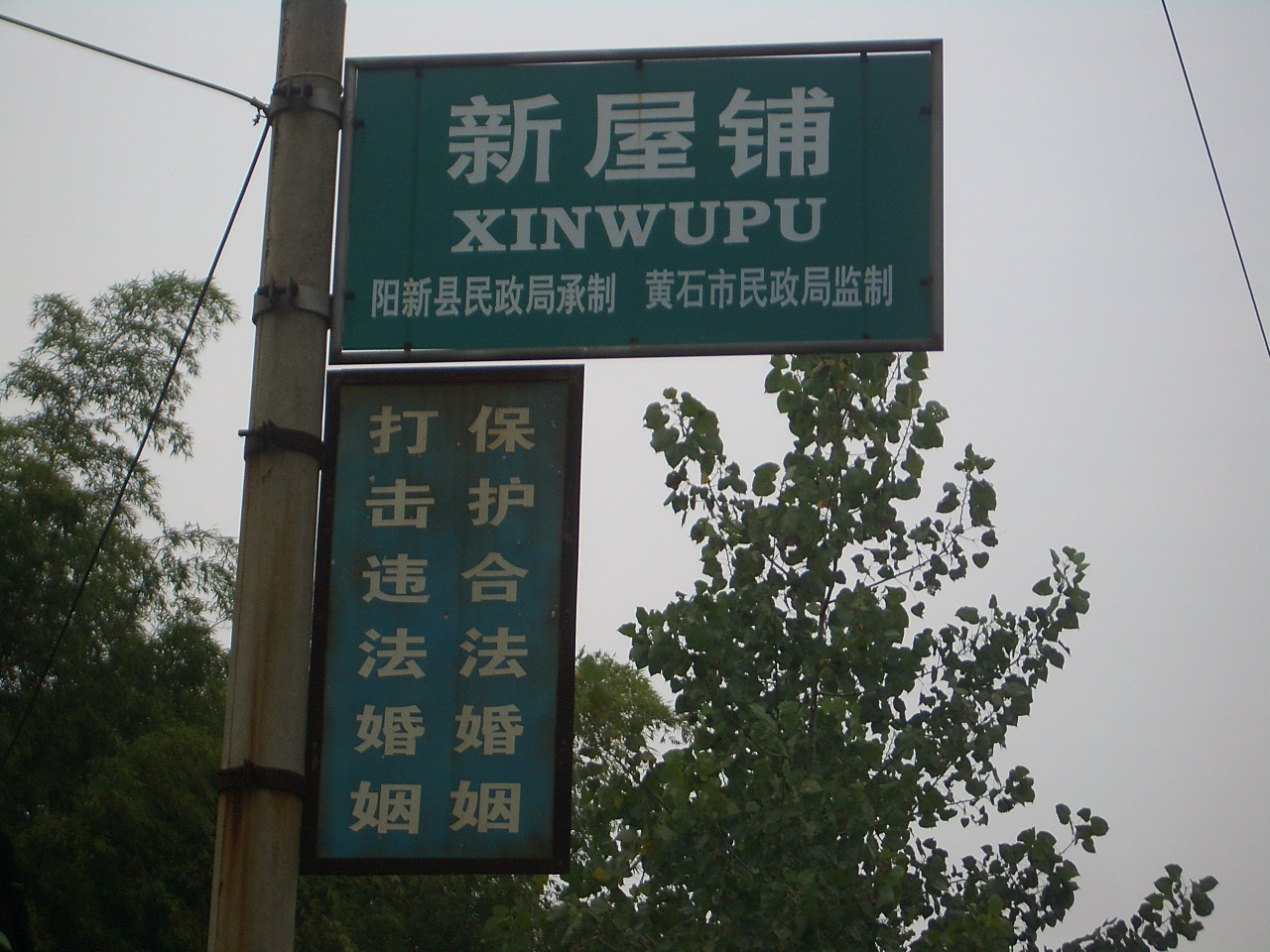
"Treasure legal marriage, fight illegal marriage!", a slogan in the village of Xinwupu, Yangxin County, Hubei

While some countries, such as Australia, permit marriages to be held in private and at any location, others, including England, require that the civil ceremony be conducted in a place specially sanctioned by law (e.g. a church or register office), and be open to the public. An exception can be made in the case of marriage by special emergency license, which is normally granted only when one of the parties is terminally ill. Rules about where and when persons can marry vary from place to place. Some regulations require that one of the parties reside in the locality of the registry office. New legislative proposals in the UK are expected to expand marriage licensing laws significantly in England and Wales.

== Ending a marriage ==
A marriage can end when one partner dies, by divorce, or by annulment. Divorce laws vary significantly by country. The only country that does not allow divorce for any citizen is Vatican City, an ecclesiastical state, which has no procedure for divorce. The Philippines also does not allow for divorce amongst most of its citizens, however Muslims are free to divorce under certain requirements, although the Philippines has been considering making divorce legal amongst all its citizens since 2024.

Countries that have relatively recently legalized divorce are Italy (1970), Portugal (1975), Brazil (1977), Spain (1981), Argentina (1987), Paraguay (1991), Colombia (1991) (Note: Divorce between 1976-1991 was allowed only for non-Catholics.) Ireland (1996), Chile (2004) and Malta (2011).

== See also ==
- Marriage Act
- Mesopotamian marriage law
- Prohibited degree of kinship
