= Red roof =

Red roof may refer to:

- Red Roof Inn, a motel chain
- Red roofs, a short film in the Israeli pastiche Yellow Asphalt
- "Red Roof", corporate headquarters of the American company Wawa
