= Easy Wedding =

Wedding agency based in the UAE

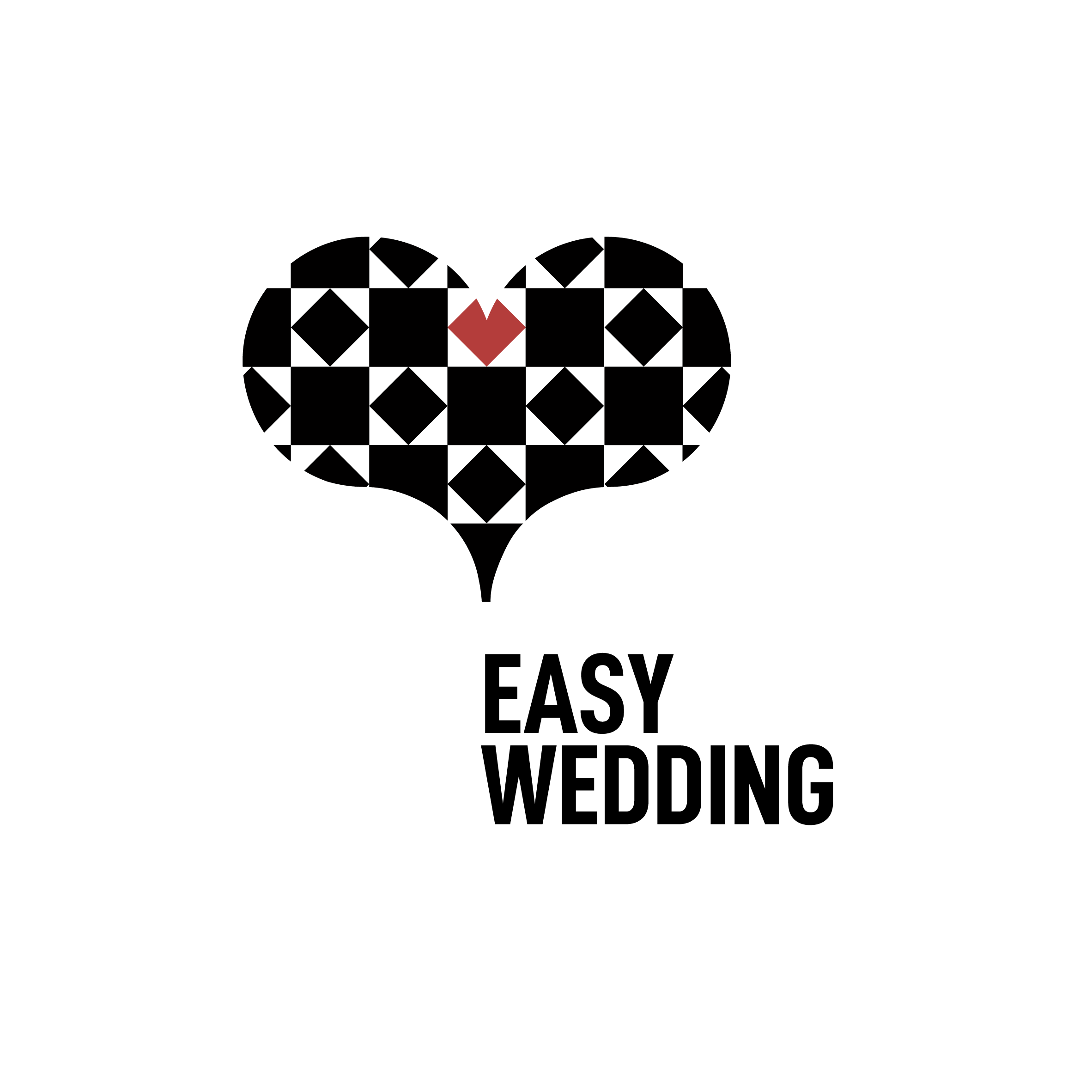
- Industry: weddings
- Founded: 2019
- Founder: Florian Ughetto and Liz Nuñez
- Headquarters: UAE
- Website: https://easywedding.me/

Easy Wedding is a wedding agency based in the UAE. The company was founded by Florian Ughetto and Liz Nunez in 2019.

== History ==
Easy Wedding was founded in 2019 by Florian Ughetto from France and Liz Nuñez from Paraguay. After legally marrying in Georgia in 2019 due to nationality-based legal issues, they created Easy Wedding, to assitst other couples struggling with international marriage laws.

On May 19, 2022, Ughetto and Nuñez were married in the metaverse due to the strict travel restrictions imposed by the COVID-19 pandemic.

In August 2024, Easy Wedding publicized a special visa-initiative by the Abu Dhabi government offering visa support for Indian couples planning destination weddings in Abu Dhabi.
