= Besha =

Besha may refer to:

- Besha, Afghanistan, a town in Afghanistan
- Bisha'a (ordeal by fire, trial by fire or fire test), a ritual practiced by Bedouin tribes of the Judean, Negev and Sinai deserts for the purpose of lie detection
