= Bisha'a =

Bedouin lie detection ritual

Bisha'a or Bisha (Arabic: بِشْعَة; ordeal by fire, trial by fire or fire test) is a ritual practiced by some Bedouin tribes of the Judean, Negev and Sinai deserts for the purpose of lie detection. It is also practiced, and is said to have originated among, some Bedouin tribes of Saudi Arabia. It is the best-known of various forms of trial by ordeal which are practiced by the Bedouin. It is one of the rituals in the Bedouin justice dispensary system for maintaining Sharaf - the Bedouin honor code.

== Ritual ==
The basic ritual consists of the accused being asked to lick a hot metal object (spoon, ladle, rod, etc.) thrice. He is provided with water for rinsing after the ceremony. He is then inspected by the official who presides over the ceremony - the Mubesha (or Mubasha) - and by the designated witnesses of the ritual. If the person undergoing the ritual is found to have a scarred or burnt tongue, it is concluded that he was lying. The Howeitat Bedouin call this ritual "the true light of God".

The Bisha'a is usually performed only to resolve the gravest of civil or criminal offences, and is a voluntary ritual in the sense that consent on the part of the ritual undergoer is required. Typically, Bisha'a is only performed for those cases where there are no witnesses regarding the disputed issue. Societal peer and hierarchy pressures may, however, force consent. In the case of the defendant agreeing to a Bisha'a ceremony, and subsequently declining to perform the ritual or running away, the defendant is considered guilty.

The ritual is usually a public affair, with both parties arriving with fanfare. Tea is often served. Women are allowed to participate in the occasion, unlike other judiciary hearings of the Bedouins.

The instrument of the ritual - typically a metal ladle called the tassa bil basha is heated up by sticking the ladle down into the flames, the convex side being pressed into the ashes. Gasoline is often poured on the metal to heat it up. In the absence of a ladle, other metal objects like knives, spoons and rods are also used, and use of non-metals like rocks have also been documented. Both parties recount their side of the story during the process of heating, with the Mubesha interrupting for clarification. The Mubesha can also summarize the events. When the Mubesha decides that the ladle is sufficiently heated, both parties swear to God that the issue will end with the ritual, and the defendant undertakes the test. In some variants, the claimant can lick the spoon before the defendant in a bid to worry the defendant (This rare variant is practiced by the Armilat Bedouin). The Mubesha then counts worry beads (possibly prayer beads), and after a suitable lapse of time, inspects the tongue of the person undergoing the ritual. He decides whether or not the tongue is burnt (or the degree of the burn in some cases), and relates his decision to the assembly. The defendant then shows his tongue to the witnesses for inspection.

== Mubesha ==
The right to perform Bisha'a is granted only to the Mubesha, and this right is passed on from father to son, along paternal lineages. The Mubesha hears the account of the dispute before performing the ceremony, and is also responsible for pressing the metal spoon against the tongue of the person undergoing the Bisha'a. There are only a few practitioners of the Bisha'a in Bedouin society. A single Mubesha might arbitrate over several tribes and large geographical areas, like the Mubesha of Abu Sultan in Egypt. In the Sinai Peninsula, Bisha'a is widely used.

== Legend ==
The legend behind the Bisha'a goes back to a man of great powers named Weymer abu Ayad of the Sultani branch of the Ayayideh tribe of the Qahtan confederation of Bedouins in southern Saudi Arabia. Many Mubesha claim to be able to trace their heritage to the tribe of Ayayideh. Weymer was a tracker but was robbed of a personal possession. He figured out the criminal, but there were no witnesses. Apparently, Weymer challenged the suspect to lick a red-hot branding iron three times which he would also lick three times, saying that the guilty would be shown. The suspect ran away.

== Legitimacy ==
The Bisha'a was illegal under British Mandate rule, though numerous accounts of the performance of the ritual are documented in the records of the Foreign Office. The Bisha'a is illegal under the Israeli judicial system. It is also inconsistent with some interpretations of Sharia, Islamic law, being an old ritual passed on by Bedouins from pre-Islamic times. Most Arab states thus denounce the Bisha'a. The practice is getting rarer, with more and more Bedouins preferring standard courts of law for enactment of justice.

== Documentation ==
The Bisha'a has been variously described in ethnographic and cross-cultural studies. The earliest well-documented reports of the Bisha'a ceremony come from the accounts of Austin Kennett, Claude Jarvis and G. W. Murray. Later accounts of Glubb Pasha and Aref al-Aref also refer to the practice. Glubb Pasha's account mentions the high rate of correct judgement, which he attributes to the skill of the mubesha. A quote from his account:

In practice, more than half the accused persons who set out to lick the spoon lose their nerve while the spoon is in the fire, and voluntarily confess to their guilt without blistering their tongues. A further twenty-five per cent probably blister their tongues, and twenty-five per cent are declared innocent. The efficiency of the process depends, of course, entirely on the skill of the "mubesha." The days of the "true light of God" are doubtless numbered, and in the full glare of modern democracy and (doubtless) enlightenment, the little red-hot spoon will soon vanish. Before it does so, I cannot resist paying a tribute to the skill of those who practise this infamous superstition, and to the considerable number of miscarriages of justice which were by this means avoided.

The quasiscientific explanation of the ordeal is that stress would cause the mouth of liar to dry up, hence increasing the possibility of a burn. However, the stress of the ordeal could just as easily cause the same physical symptoms in an innocent person.

Like many trials by ordeal, correct results depend on the judge being able to swap out the testing item right before use if the judge believes the person to be innocent.

== In popular culture ==
Recent interest in the Bisha'a stems from two contemporary Israeli films which portray it: Yellow Asphalt (2001) and Bisha: The Awesome Fire Test (2002).
