= Forced suicide =

Execution method in which the victim is forced or incentivised to kill themselves

Forced suicide is a method of execution in which the victim is coerced into committing suicide to avoid facing an alternative option which they perceive as much worse, such as being tortured to death, suffering public humiliation, or having friends or family members punished.

== In ancient Greece and Rome ==
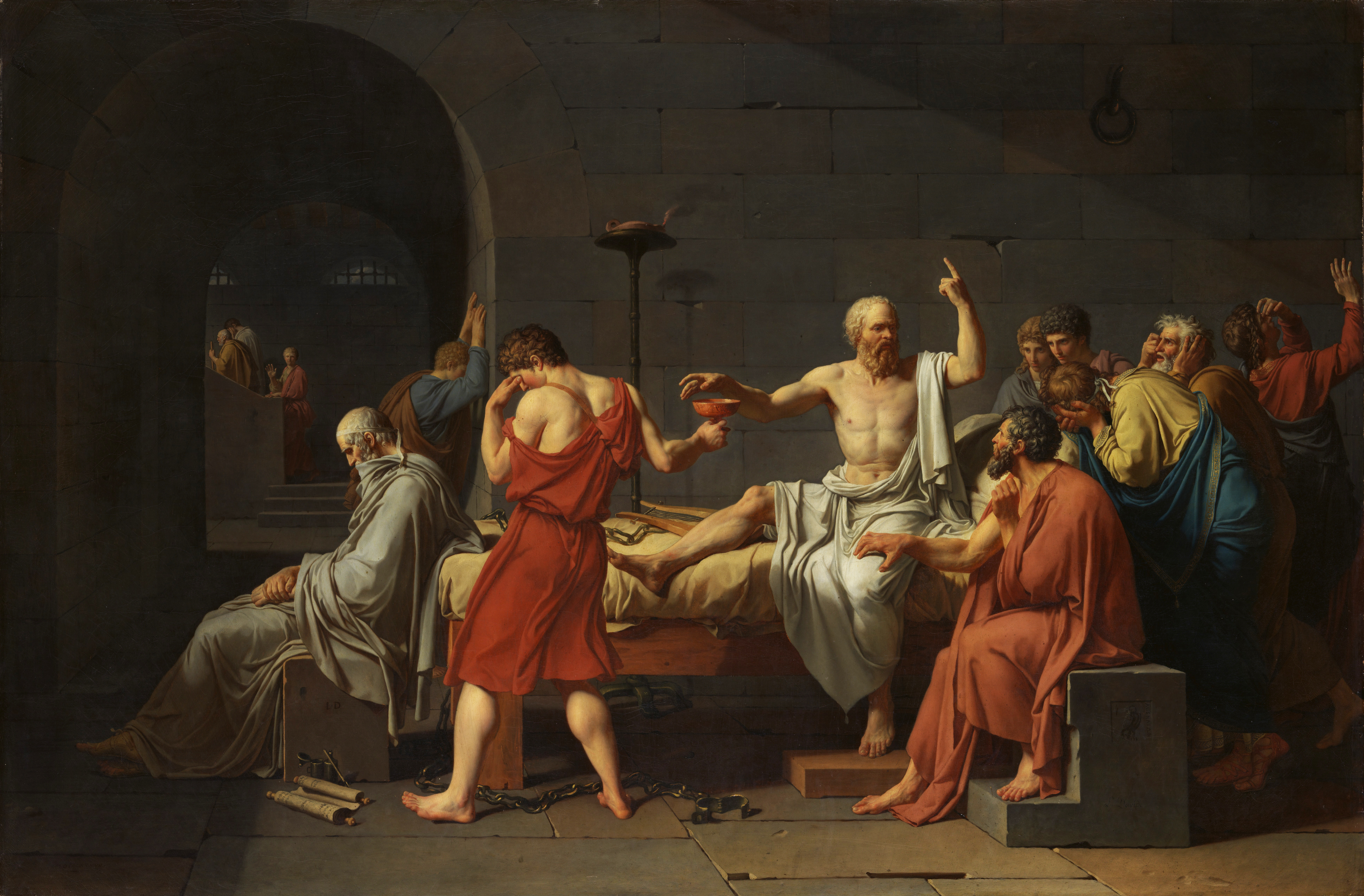
The Death of Socrates by Jacques-Louis David (1787)

Forced suicide was a common means of execution in ancient Greece and ancient Rome. As a mark of respect, it was generally reserved for aristocrats sentenced to death; the victims would either drink hemlock or fall on their swords. Economic motivations prompted some suicides in ancient Rome. A person who was condemned to death would forfeit property to the government. People could evade that provision and let the property pass to their heirs by committing suicide prior to arrest.

One of the most well-known forced suicides is that of the philosopher Socrates, who drank hemlock after his trial for allegedly corrupting the youth of Athens. The Stoic philosopher Seneca also killed himself in response to an order by his pupil, the Roman Emperor Nero, who himself was forced to commit suicide at a later date. Other famous forced suicides include Corbulo who was also killed by Nero following Corbulo's implication in plots against him.

== In Asia ==
The Hindu practice of sati, in which a recently widowed woman would immolate herself on her husband's funeral pyre, is not generally considered a type of honor killing. However, the extent up to which Sati was a purely voluntary act or one that was coerced is actively debated. There have been some incidents in recent times, such as the Roop Kanwar case, in which forced sati was suspected. Additional cases are under investigation, though no evidence of forced suicide has yet been found.

Some instances of Japanese seppuku fall into this category. The culture practiced by the samurai expected them to ritually kill themselves if found disloyal, sparing a daimyō or shōgun the indignity of executing a follower. This was especially the case in the Edo period, and Asano Naganori was a clear example.

== In Europe ==
Generalfeldmarschall Erwin Rommel was implicated in a plot to assassinate Adolf Hitler in autumn 1944. On Hitler's orders, two generals, Wilhelm Burgdorf and Ernst Maisel, went to Rommel's home and offered him a choice of either going through a public trial (which would inevitably lead to his execution and the punishment of his family), taking his own life by swallowing cyanide (in which case he would receive a hero's funeral and his family would be spared imprisonment), or report directly to Hitler in Berlin. Rommel opted for suicide on 14 October 1944; his widow and son confirmed these details after the war.

== As a substitute for honor killings ==
A forced suicide may be a substitute for an honor killing when a woman violates the namus in some conservative Islamic sects. In 2006, the United Nations investigated reports of forced suicides of women in southeastern Turkey.
