= Hague Marriage Convention =

1978 family law treaty

Convention of 14 March 1978 on Celebration and Recognition of the Validity of Marriages
- Signed: 25 March 1978
- Location: The Netherlands
- Effective: 1 May 1991
- Condition: Ratification by 3 states
- Signatories: 6
- Parties: 3: Australia; Luxembourg; Netherlands
- Depositary: Ministry of Foreign Affairs (Netherlands)
- Languages: French and English

The Hague Convention on Celebration and Recognition of the Validity of Marriages or Hague Marriage Convention is a multilateral treaty developed by the Hague Conference on Private International Law that provides the recognition of marriages. The convention was signed in 1978 by Portugal, Luxembourg and Egypt, and later by Australia, Finland and the Netherlands. It entered into force more than 10 years after opening for signature after ratification by Australia, the Netherlands (for its European territory only) and Luxembourg, and no countries have acceded to the convention since. It replaced the 1902 Convention Governing Conflicts of Laws Concerning Marriage.

== See also ==
- Hague Conference on Private International Law
- International matrimonial law

== External sources ==
- Status table of signatories and ratifications Hague Conference on Private International Law
- Treaty text Hague Conference on Private International Law
