= Bedouin systems of justice =

Systems of justice among the Bedouin Arabs are varied among the tribes. A number of these systems date from pre-Islamic times, and hence do not follow Sharia (Islamic religious law). Many of these systems are falling into disuse as more and more Bedouins follow the Sharia or national penal codes for dispensing justice.

== General principles ==
Bedouin justice is dispensed based on the honor codes of the Bedouin—sharaf for men and ird for women. Bedouin customs relating to preservation of honor, along with those relating to hospitality and bravery, date to pre-Islamic times. In many Bedouin courts, women often do not have a say as defendant or witness, and decisions are taken by village elders.

Members of a single tribe usually follow the same system of justice, and often claim descent from a single common ancestor. Closely related tribes may also follow similar systems of justice, and may even have common arbitrating courts. Jurists in Arab states have often referred to Bedouin customs as precedent.

In smaller Bedouin tribes, conflict resolution can be as informal as talks between families of the two parties. However, social protocols of conflict resolution are in place for the larger tribes.

Bedouins, as nomads, do not have the concept of incarceration. Petty crimes, and some major ones, are typically settled by fines, and grievous crimes by corporal or capital punishment. Bedouin tribes are typically held responsible for the action of their members; if the accused fails to pay a fine, the accused's tribe is expected to pay and becomes obligated to the tribe.

== Trial by ordeal ==
Trial by ordeal is used by the Bedouin to decide on the gravest of crimes. Authorities to hold such trials and judge them are granted to few, and that too on a hereditary basis. The most well-known of the trials by ordeal is the bisha'a, a custom practiced among the Bedouin of Palestine and the Sinai Peninsula. It is a protocol for lie detection, and is enacted only in the harshest of civil or criminal violations, such as in a case of a blood feud, usually in the absence of witnesses. It entails the accused to lick a hot metal spoon and subsequently rinse the mouth with water. If the tongue shows signs of a burn or a scar the accused is taken to be guilty of lying.

== Common forms of judicial hierarchy ==
- Orfi: A one-level judicial system – Some Bedouin tribes of the Sinai use arbitration by orfi courts. Orfi courts do not seek to find the truth or condemn the guilty, but act more as mediators between two parties. Orfi courts are headed by a muktar (judge). Orfi courts can authorize the bisha'a, but could be overruled by protocols governing blood feuds.
- Ghadi: A two-level hierarchy – The Alegat Bedouin of Egypt appoint three judges (ghadi). One may appeal to a different judge if one is unhappy with the result of the conflict resolution. Alternatively, one may appeal to the sheikh (tribal leader), whose judgement cannot be overruled.
- Armilat: A multi-level hierarchy – The Armilat Bedouin have five levels of arbiters – judges with increasing levels of authority. The lowest-level arbiters are the kafeel (a person of power and stature or great physical strength in the tribe, chosen by each party). The claimant then approaches the kafeel of the other party, who acts as intermediary. Kafeels are paid for their work and not hereditary. All arbiters above the kafeel have hereditary powers and in increasing power of arbitration, are: kabir, adraybee, manshaad, and the highest authority, the jrabiee. The jrabiee are actually capable of performing the bisha'a, and are hence mubashas in this sense.

== Blood feud protocols ==
Protocols regarding blood feuds often override court decisions and may vary from tribe to tribe. Punishment for murder is usually harsher than that meted out for acts of disturbing the assahiya or solidarity of the tribe. The punishment for murder is usually capital punishment, but in some tribes a blood vengeance fee may be exacted instead. The general governing principle is that of Dum butlab dum ("blood begets blood"), which may be compared to "an eye for an eye". In many tribes, the first five levels of male cousins (Khamsa) are obligated to seek out and kill the murderer. If not found, another male member of the murderer's tribe would have to die in the retaliatory killing.

== See also ==
- Revenge
- Guilt-Shame-Fear spectrum of cultures
- Honor codes of the Bedouin
