= Yellow Asphalt =

2001 film by Danny Verete

- אספלט צהוב
- Directed by: Danny Verete
- Written by: Danny Verete
- Produced by: Danny Verete
- Starring: Sami Samir; Tatjana Blacher; Raida Adon; Motti Katz; Moshe Ivgi; Abed Zuabi; Zevik Raz
- Distributed by: Danny Verete Film Productions
- Release date: 2000
- Running time: 83 minutes
- Country: Israel
- Language: Hebrew

Yellow Asphalt (Hebrew: אספלט צהוב, Asfalt Tzahov) is a 2000 Israeli film depicting Jahalin Bedouins and their way of life, specifically their conflict with Israeli Jews. The film is a pastiche of three short stories depicted sequentially:

- Black spot (Moshe Ivgi, Zevik Raz) – about an Israeli tanker crew which runs over a Bedouin boy
- Here is not there (Tatjana Blacher, Abed Zuabi) – about the doomed love of a German woman and her Bedouin husband
- Red roofs (Raida Adon, Sami Samir, Motti Katz) – about a love affair / physical relationship of an Israeli Jewish farmer and his Bedouin maid

The stories are shot on location in the Judean Desert, and cast members of the Jahalin Bedouin tribe in acting roles. The three shorts are woven together by the presence of the same village elders in all the films, who happen to be actual members of the Jahalin Bedouin. The film was released with Hebrew and Arabic audio tracks. The entire film took seven years to complete. The film tries to portray the clash of civilizations between the Bedouins and Israeli Jews in a non-judgmental manner.

Shot before the Second Intifada, the film steers clear of political themes, focusing instead on social issues.

== Plots ==
=== Black spot ===
An Israeli tanker runs over a Bedouin boy who was crossing the highway with his donkey. The truck driver and his help decide to move the body to the side of the road and flee. The truck's self ignition fails and by the time they repair it Bedouins surround them. The tense, almost wordless stand-off is broken when the truck help, under orders from the truck driver, removes an extra wheel from the truck and gives it to the Bedouins to pass judgment on.

=== Here is not there ===
A council of village elders meet to discuss the marital problems of a Bedouin man and his German wife. The wife, who wants to leave with her two children back to Germany, is instructed to return to her tent and her family. She decides to escape in the middle of the night with her two children. She runs most of the night, carrying her younger child and leading her older one, before falling asleep exhausted. Her husband had pursued her across the desert wadis in a 4WD and finds her. She flags down an Israeli truck whose driver hides her, but her crying children reveal her presence to her husband. She takes flight with the children, but is ultimately caught by her husband and stoned.

This entire episode turns out to be the cautionary daydream of the German wife in question, who ultimately decides to leave in the middle of the night with her two children anyway.

=== Red roofs ===
A Palestinian housekeeper, wife of a Bedouin leader, has an extramarital affair with an Israeli Jewish farmer who has a wife and children of his own. Bedouin children see them making love in the desert and inform her husband, who beats her up. She decides to seek shelter at the farmer's place, because he had promised to protect her. However, the farmer decides to avoid trouble with the Bedouin tribe and asks his Bedouin farmhand to kill the woman and dispose of the body and gun. The farmhand is unable to kill her and takes her to an unspecified Israeli city, lets her go and tells her not to come back. When she returns anyway, the farmer shoots her dead. The farmhand disposes of the body and gun inefficiently, leading to the discovery of both. A blood feud is thus inadvertently started between the family of the housekeeper and that of the farmyard help. The farmhand ultimately undergoes the primeval "fire test" to prove his innocence and tells the Bedouin elders about the guilt of the Israeli farmer. The farmhand is excommunicated from his clan, but given a chance to redeem himself by killing the farmer. He fails to do so, and the Israeli farmer is shown being pursued by the housekeeper's brother. The final scene shows the farmhand, an outcast from his society, hitching a ride into the same Israeli city with words he had used to chide the housekeeper about living in two disparate worlds playing in the background.

== See also ==
The story Red Roofs was the basis of the 2007 film Before the Rains, which was set in 1930s British India and shot on location in Kerala, India.

== Awards ==
- Best film - Haifa International Film Festival, 2000
- Won, Special Jury Prize, Cologne Mediterranean Film Festival, 2001
- Nominated, Best Cinematography, Award of the Israeli Film Academy, 2000
- Nominated, Best Screenplay, Award of the Israeli Film Academy, 2000
- Nominated for 6 Ophir Awards (Israeli Academy of Film and Television).
