= Rugiatu Turay =

Sierra Leonean women's rights activist

- Born: Rugiatu Neneh Koroma
- Organization: Amazonian Initiative Movement
- Known for: campaigning against female genital mutilation

Rugiatu Turay is a Sierra Leonean women's rights activist. who is a staunch campaigner against female genital mutilation. She is the founder of The Amazonian Initiative Movement, a nonprofit organization with the main objective of eliminating the cultural practice of female genital mutilation in West Africa.

== Personal life ==
When Turay was 11 years old, she, together with her sisters, had to visit their aunt at the country's capital, Freetown. Upon their arrival, Turay was forcibly blindfolded and laid down as women sat on her chest, arms, and legs. A cloth was stuffed in her mouth and she was stripped naked as women clap, sing, and shout that it was the day that she officially becomes a woman. It turns out that she wasn't sent to visit her aunt but to be genitally mutilated. The woman used a crude penknife to cut off her private parts. The women warned her as well to never to talk about the incident or else she would die. Turay recalled that the process was very painful and that she still bled after for two days. She recalled fainting after attempting to walk. When the wound healed the scar was itchy and got infected. Because of this, she suffered intense pain during her menstruation and it resulted to blood clots and a cyst.

When the time came for Turay's siblings to be genitally mutilated, Turay tried to step in, but it was unsuccessful. When her cousin died due to the same traditional practice, Turay was triggered to campaign against female genital mutilation.

== Career ==
Turay worked as the country's Deputy Minister of Social welfare, Gender and Children's Affairs. In 2002, Turay led the conceptualization and establishment of the Amazonian Initiative Movement. On 22 October 2020, Rugiati Turay was awarded with Theodor Haecker human rights prize for her contribution and fight against female genital mutilation in Sierra Leone.

== History and mission of Amazonian Initiative Movement ==
Due to the civil war, Turay fled from the country in 1997. At the refugee camps of Guinea, she met fellow women that are against genital mutilation. With these women she formed the Amazonian Initiative Movement. In 2003, Turay returned to Sierra Leone to begin the organization's vision in her country. The Amazonian Initiative Movement, apart from educating and eradicating the deeply ingrained cultural practice of genital mutilation, aims to promote gender equality by providing women education. The nonprofit organization also addresses other issues regarding women's rights violation, specifically through child marriage, forced marriage and domestic violence.

The Amazonian Initiative Movement personally visits villages to educate women regarding female genital mutilation. They also provide other means of income to the designated elders who perform female genital mutilation so as to convince them. The organization also provides a home for fleeing victims of genital mutilation.

The organization faced much backlash from authorities. The organization received countless death threats, causing four activists to resign. Female genital mutilation had been extremely prevalent in Sierra Leone in comparison to many countries in Africa. After years of activism, the practice is now illegal in the country, and Turay is campaigning for substitute rites of passage that are safer than female genital mutilation.

== Female genital mutilation ==
The act of female genital mutilation usually involves the use of razor blades, pen knives and/or broken glass. It is performed by designated elderly women in the village. For well-off families in some other countries, a medical personnel is sought, so as to avoid the repercussions of the brutal and unsanitary procedure. The practice has religious, sociological, and socioeconomic reasons other than the widely held definition of womanhood — chastity.
