= Mesopotamian marriage law =

In Mesopotamian marriage law, marriage was regarded as a legal contract, and divorce as its breakup were similarly affected by official procedures.
