= Honor codes of the Bedouin =

Aspect of Bedouin society

Sharaf and ird are Bedouin honor codes. Along with hospitality and courage/bravery, it is one of the Bedouin aspects of ethics. Bedouin systems of justice are based on these honor codes, although the codes are falling into disuse as more Bedouins accept sharia or national penal codes as the means for dispensing justice.

== Muruwah ==
Muruwah can be translated to 'manliness' but its meaning is more broad. It meant courage in battle but also called for patience and endurance in suffering and dedication to the tribe. This virtue required obeisance to the chief (sayyid) regardless of personal safety. Duty called upon one to avenge any wrongdoing committed against him or the tribe.

This concept worked well in lawless regions to ensure the survival of the tribe. The accompanying vendetta (blood-feud) that was threatened by the breaking of honor codes was a way of ensuring security and order in a region without central authority.

== Ird ==
Ird (Arabic: عرض, romanized: ʿirḍ) is the Bedouin honor code for women. A woman is born with her ird intact, but sexual transgression can take it away. It is different from virginity, as it is emotional and conceptual. Once lost, ird cannot be regained.

== Sharaf ==
Sharaf is the general Bedouin honor code for men. It can be acquired, augmented, lost, and regained. Sharaf involves protection of the ird of the women of the family, protection of property, and maintenance of the honor of the tribe and protection of the village (if the tribe has settled).

== Diyafa ==
Diyafa (Arabic: ضيافة, romanized: ḍiyāfa, lit. 'hospitality') is a virtue closely linked to sharaf. If required, even an enemy must be given shelter and fed for some days. Poverty does not exempt one from one's duties in this regard. Generosity is a related virtue, and in many Bedouin societies, gifts must be offered and cannot be declined. The destitute are looked after by the community, and tithing is mandatory in many Bedouin societies.

== Hamasa ==
Hamasa (courage/bravery) is also closely linked to sharaf. Bravery indicates the willingness to defend one's tribe for the purpose of aṣabīya (tribal solidarity and balance). It is closely related to muruwa (manliness). It usually entails the ability to withstand pain, including (male) circumcision.

== See also ==
- Revenge
- Guilt–shame–fear spectrum of cultures
- Bedouin systems of justice
