= Zakir Husain =

President of India from 1967 to 1969

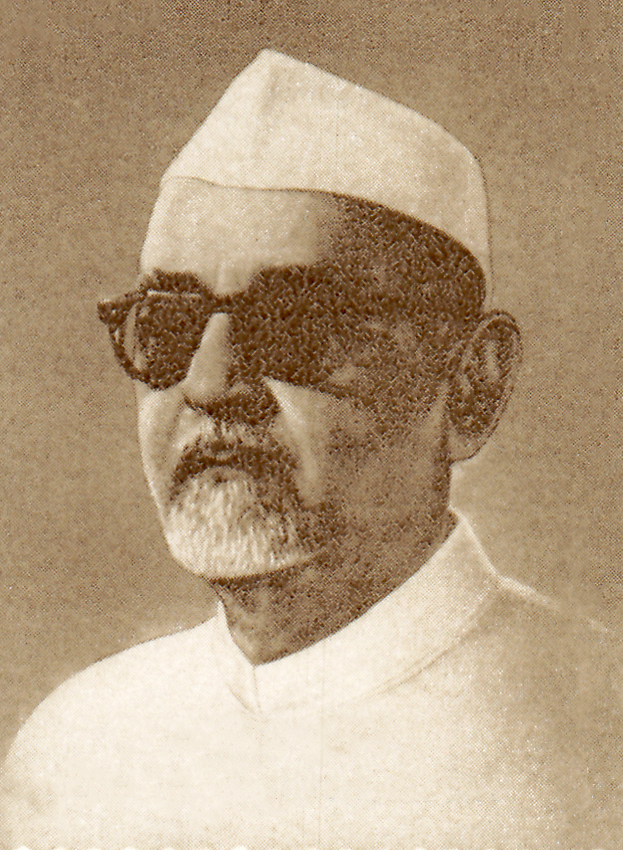
- Husain on a 1998 stamp of India

President of India
- In office 13 May 1967 – 3 May 1969
- Prime Minister: Indira Gandhi
- Vice President: V. V. Giri
- Preceded by: Sarvepalli Radhakrishnan
- Succeeded by: V. V. Giri (interim)

Vice President of India
- In office 13 May 1962 – 13 May 1967
- President: Sarvepalli Radhakrishnan
- Prime Minister: Jawaharlal Nehru; Lal Bahadur Shastri; Indira Gandhi (Note: Gulzarilal Nanda (acting) for some time)
- Preceded by: Sarvepalli Radhakrishnan
- Succeeded by: V. V. Giri

Governor of Bihar
- In office 6 July 1957 – 11 May 1962
- Chief Minister: Shri Krishna Sinha (1957–1961); Deep Narayan Singh (1961); Binodanand Jha (1961–1962)
- Preceded by: R. R. Diwakar
- Succeeded by: Madabhushi Ananthasayanam Ayyangar

Member of Parliament, Rajya Sabha
- In office 3 April 1952 – 6 July 1957
- Preceded by: Office established
- Succeeded by: Tara Chand
- Constituency: Nominated (Education)

Personal details
- Born: 8 February 1897 Hyderabad, Hyderabad State, British India(present-day Telangana, India)
- Died: 3 May 1969 (aged 72) New Delhi, Delhi, India
- Party: Independent
- Spouse: Shah Jahan Begum (m. 1915)
- Children: 2
- Relatives: Yusuf Husain (brother); Mahmud Husain (brother); Rahimuddin Khan (nephew); Khurshed Alam Khan (son-in-law); Salman Khurshid (grandson)
- Education: University of Lucknow (BA); University of Allahabad (MA); University of Berlin (PhD)
- Profession: Economist; politician

Zakir Husain Khan (8 February 1897 – 3 May 1969) was an Indian educationist and politician who served as the vice president of India from 1962 to 1967 and president of India from 13 May 1967 until his death on 3 May 1969.

Born in Hyderabad in an Afridi Pashtun family, Husain completed his schooling in Etawah and went on to study at the Muhammadan Anglo-Oriental College, Aligarh and the University of Berlin from where he obtained a doctoral degree in economics. A close associate of Mahatma Gandhi, Husain was a founding member of the Jamia Millia Islamia which was established as an independent national university in response to the Non-cooperation movement. He served as the university's vice-chancellor from 1926 to 1948. In 1937, Husain chaired the Basic National Education Committee which framed a new educational policy known as Nai Talim (literally meaning "New Education" in Urdu) which emphasized free and compulsory education in the first language. He was opposed to the policy of separate electorates for Muslims and, in 1946, the Muslim League under Muhammad Ali Jinnah vetoed a proposal by the Indian National Congress to include Husain in the Interim Government of India.

Following Independence and the Partition of India Husain stayed on in India and, in 1948, was appointed Vice Chancellor of the Aligarh Muslim University which he helped retain as a national institution of higher learning. For his services to education, he was awarded the Padma Vibhushan in 1954 and was made a nominated member of the Indian Parliament during 1952 to 1957. Husain served as Governor of Bihar from 1957 to 1962 and was elected the Vice President of India in 1962. The following year, he was conferred the Bharat Ratna. He was elected president in 1967, succeeding Sarvepalli Radhakrishnan, and became the first Muslim to hold the highest constitutional office in India. He was also the first incumbent to die in office and had the shortest tenure of any Indian president. His mazar lies in the campus of the Jamia Millia Islamia in Delhi.

An author and translator of several books into Urdu and a prolific writer of children's books, Husain has been commemorated in India through postage stamps and several educational institutions, libraries, roads and Asia's largest rose garden that have been named after him.

== Early life and family ==
Husain was born in Hyderabad in 1897 and was of Afridi Pashtun descent, his forefathers having settled in the town of Qaimganj in the Farrukhabad district of modern Uttar Pradesh. His father, Fida Husain Khan, moved to the Deccan and established a successful legal career in Hyderabad where he settled in 1892. Husain was the third of seven sons of Fida Khan and Naznin Begum. He was homeschooled in the Quran, Persian and Urdu and is thought that he had his primary school education at the Sultan Bazaar school in Hyderabad. Following his father's death in 1907 Husain's family shifted back to Qaimganj and he was enrolled at the Islamia High School in Etawah. Husain's mother and several members of his extended family died in a plague epidemic in 1911.

Having matriculated in 1913, he joined the Muhammadan Anglo-Oriental College at Aligarh and later, in preparation for a medical degree, at the Lucknow Christian College enrolling for a Bachelor of Science degree. A bout of illness led to him having to discontinue his studies and a year later he rejoined the college at Aligarh. Husain graduated in 1918 with philosophy, English literature and economics. He was elected vice president of the college's students' union and won prizes for his debating skills. Husain pursued the disciplines of law and economics for his post-graduate studies. Having obtained his master's degree in 1920, he was appointed as a lecturer at the college.

In 1915, while still pursuing his graduation, Husain married Shahjahan Begum with whom he had two daughters, Saeeda Khurshid and Safia Rahman. Safia married Zil-ur-Rahman, a professor of physics at the Aligarh Muslim University while Saeeda married Khurshed Alam Khan who served as a Union Minister and Governor. Their son Salman Khurshid became India's External Affairs Minister in 2012.

Of Husain's six brothers, Yusuf Husain became a historian and a winner of the Sahitya Akademi Award who served as Pro Vice-Chancellor of the Aligarh Muslim University. Mahmud Husain was closely associated with the Pakistan Movement, becoming Minister of Education in the Government of Pakistan and Vice-Chancellor at Dhaka and Karachi Universities. His nephew, General Rahimuddin Khan went on to become Pakistan's Chairman Joint Chiefs of Staff Committee and later Governor of Balochistan and Sindh. Masud Husain, the nephew from his eldest brother, became Professor Emeritus in Social Sciences at the Aligarh Muslim University and later Vice Chancellor of Jamia Millia Islamia.

== Career ==
=== Sheikh-ul-Jamia, Jamia Millia Islamia (1926–1948) ===
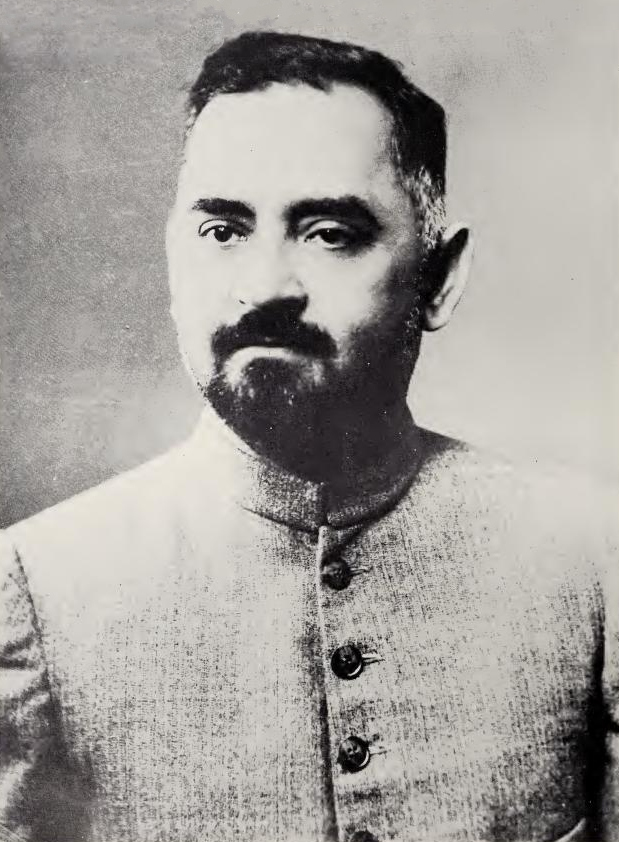
Zakir Husain became vice-chancellor of Jamia Millia Islamia aged only 29.

In 1920, Mahatma Gandhi visited the Muhammadan Anglo-Oriental College in Aligarh where he urged non-cooperation with the British Raj. In response to Gandhi's appeal, a group of students and faculty joined the Non-Cooperation Movement. In October 1920 they established the Independent National University aimed at imparting education free from colonial influence. Later renamed the Jamia Millia Islamia, it shifted in 1925 from Aligarh to Delhi. Husain was one of the founders of this private university which had Maulana Muhammad Ali as its first "Sheikh-ul-Jamia" (vice-chancellor) and Hakim Ajmal Khan as the first "Amir-i-Jamia" (chancellor). Jamia, as the Turkish educationist Halide Edib noted, had two purposes: "First, to train the Muslim youth with definite ideas of their rights and duties as Indian citizens. Second, to coordinate Islamic thought and behaviour with Hindu. The general aim is to create a harmonious nationhood without Muslims losing their Islamic identity. In its aim, if not always in its procedure, it is nearer to Gandhian Movement than any other Islamic institution I have come across." In its early years, Jamia faced shortage of funds and its continued existence was uncertain especially after the Non-Cooperation Movement and the Khilafat Committee closed down.

Husain left for Germany in 1922 to do a doctorate in economics from the University of Berlin. Supervised by Werner Sombart, his thesis on the agrarian structure in British India was accepted summa cum laude in 1926. (Note: The German title of the thesis is Die Agrar-Verfassung Britisch-Indiens.) During his time in Berlin, Husain collaborated with Alfred Ehrenreich to translate into German thirty-three of Gandhi's speeches which were published in 1924 as Die Botschaft des Mahatma Gandhi. Husain got published the Diwan-e-Ghalib in 1925 and the Diwan-i-Shaida, a collection of poetry by Hakim Ajmal Khan in 1926. He returned to India in 1926 and succeeded Abdul Majeed Khwaja as "Sheikh-ul-Jamia". He was joined by Mohammad Mujeeb and Abid Hussain – the latter becoming the university registrar. Husain travelled across India soliciting funds for the Jamia and got financial support from Mahatma Gandhi, the Bombay philanthropist Seth Jamal Mohammed, Khwaja Abdul Hamied the founder of the pharmaceutical firm Cipla and the Nizam of Hyderabad among others.

In 1928, a National Education Society was established to manage the affairs of the Jamia. Zakir Husain became its secretary. To be a life member of the society, members pledged their services to it for 20 years with a salary that could not exceed Rs.150. Husain was one of the 11 initial members who took the pledge. The society adopted a constitution for the university which stipulated that the Jamia would neither seek nor accept any help from the colonial administration, and that it would treat all religions impartially. Husain himself identified the aim of the Jamia as being to "keep alive Islamic culture and education and also help in the realization of the ideal of a common nationhood and the achievement of the freedom of the country [...] [and that] the Jamia's objectives are Islamic education, the love of independence and service to Urdu".

Husain remained the Jamia's vice chancellor until 1948. In the 1940s he built his home, the Zakir Manzil, on the Gulmohar Avenue in Jamia Nagar. Husain was opposed to the policy of separate electorates for Muslims and was a political opponent of Muhammad Ali Jinnah, the leader of the Muslim League, who vetoed the Congress proposal to include Husain as a member of the Interim Government in 1946. Husain however convinced Jinnah to attend the Jamia's silver jubilee celebration on 17 November 1946. At a time of rising animosity between the Congress and the Muslim League and worsening inter-communal relations, the celebration was attended by Jinnah, his sister Fatima and Liaquat Ali Khan from the Muslim League and Jawaharlal Nehru, Maulana Azad and C. Rajagopalachari of the Congress. In a plea to the assembled leaders, Husain said

"You, gentlemen, are the stars of the political firmament. You have a secure place in the hearts of millions of people. Taking advantage of your presence here, I wish to submit in great sorrow a few words for your consideration on behalf of the educational workers. The fire of hatred is fast spreading which makes it seem mad to tend to the garden of education. This fire is burning in a noble and humane land. How will the flowers of nobility and sensibility grow in its midst? How will we be able to improve human standards which lie today at a level far lower than that of the beasts? How shall we produce new servants devoted to the cause of education? How can you protect humanity in a world of animals? ... . An Indian poet has remarked that every child who comes to this world brings along the message that God has not yet lost faith in man. But have our countrymen so completely lost faith in themselves that they wish to crush these innocent buds before they blossom? For God's sake sit together and extinguish this fire of hatred. This is not the time to ask who is responsible for it and what is its cause. The fire is raging. Please extinguish it. For God's sake do not allow the very foundations of civilised life in this country to be destroyed." (Note: The journalist Siddharth Varadarajan has compared this speech favourably to an April 2002 speech by Prime Minister Atal Bihari Vajpayee in the aftermath of the Gujarat riots; whereas Vajpayee sought to apportion blame for starting the fire, Varadarajan says, Husain beseeched the gathered leaders to end the violence.)

=== Basic National Education Committee (1937) ===
In October 1937, an All-India National Education Conference was held at Wardha under Mahatma Gandhi which sought to establish a policy for basic education in India. The conference appointed a Basic National Education chaired by Husain (also known as the Zakir Husain committee) which was tasked with preparing the detailed scheme and syllabus for this policy. The committee submitted its report in December 1937 and formulated the Wardha Scheme of Basic National Education or Nai Talim. The policy, inter alia, proposed teaching craft work in schools, instilling ideals of citizenship, and its establishment as a self-supporting scheme. It proposed seven years of free and compulsory basic education in the mother tongue, the teaching of crafts, music and drawing and learning the Hindustani language. It also proposed a comprehensive plan for the training of teachers and framed its curriculum.

The Congress party in its Haripura session of 1938 accepted the scheme and sought to implement it nationwide. An All-India Education Board (the Hindustani Talimi Sangh) was established to implement the scheme under Husain and E.W. Aryanayakam with Gandhi as its overall supervisor. Husain remained the President of the Hindustani Talimi Sangh from 1938 to 1950 when he was succeeded by Kaka Kalelkar. The scheme was wholly opposed by the Muslim League which saw the scheme as an attempt to gradually destroy Muslim culture in India and the focus on Hindustani language as a ploy to replace Urdu with Sanskritized Hindi. The Congress party's argument that the scheme had been formulated by Husain was rejected by the Muslim League in its Patna session of 1939 where it declared that "the mere fact that the Principal of Jamia Millia at Delhi has taken a prominent part in the preparation of the scheme does not prove that it is not unsuited to the Muslims". India's National Policy on Education of 1968, 1988 and 2020 all draw on the ideas contained in the Wardha Scheme of Basic National Education.

Following the Partition of India, Husain was almost killed in communal violence at the Jalandhar railway station while he was on his way to Kashmir – an experience he described twelve years later to his friend Abdul Majid Daryabadi. On his return to Delhi, Husain worked to help the victims of rioting in Delhi. The Jamia Millia Islamia's buildings at Karol Bagh were looted and destroyed in the violence in Delhi.

=== Vice-Chancellor, Aligarh Muslim University (1948–1956) ===
Husain was appointed Vice Chancellor of the Aligarh Muslim University in 1948, succeeding Nawab Ismail Khan. The university had been closely associated with the Pakistan Movement and had been a stronghold of the Muslim League. It was therefore perceived as a center of pro-Pakistan feeling and a threat to secular India. Maulana Azad, the Union Minister of Education, tasked Husain with leading the university so that it could be retained as a national institution of higher education. Husain, who had served as a member of the Universities Commission between December 1948 and August 1949 however took regular charge only in early 1950 as he was incapacitated following a heart attack in October 1949. He set to work, attempting to dissociate the university from its past association with the Muslim League and restoring school discipline. Students released from prison for involvement in Communist activism were readmitted and socialists and communists from across North India took up the vacancies created by the departure of Muslim nationalists for Pakistan. Husain also filled up vacant faculty positions with eminent academicians. In 1951, Parliament enacted the Aligarh Muslim University (Amendment) Act which converted the university from a private, aided university to an autonomous institution of the Government of India, fully maintained by it. This ensured stability in the university's finances while also allowing it autonomy in governance. By the end of his tenure, Husain had turned around the fortunes of the university, helping it overcome the uncertainty it faced in independent India and become a national institution under the patronage of the Government of India.

Husain served as a nominated Member of the Rajya Sabha from 3 April 1952 to 2 April 1956 and was renominated in 1956, serving until his resignation on 6 July 1957 following his appointment as the Governor of Bihar. (Note: Article 80 of the Indian Constitution allows the President of India to nominate twelve members to the Parliament's Council of States or Rajya Sabha. The nominees are to be persons having special knowledge or practical experience in the fields of literature, science, art and social service. Nominated members enjoy the same powers and privileges as other members of the house, except that they cannot vote in a presidential election. Husain was one of the first group of twelve nominated members of the Rajya Sabha – a group that also included historians, jurists, Gandhians and social workers, the poet Maithilisharan Gupt, the classical dancer Rukmini Devi Arundale, scientist Satyendra Nath Bose and the actor Prithviraj Kapoor.) For his services in the areas of culture and education Husain was conferred the Padma Vibhushan in 1954. Throughout the 1950s he was associated with various organizations working in the field of education. He was chairman, India Committee, International Students Service (1955), the World University Service, Geneva during 1955–57 and was a member of the Central Board of Secondary Education (1957). He served on the executive board of the UNESCO during 1957–58.

=== Governor of Bihar (1957–1962) ===
Husain was the Governor of Bihar from 6 July 1957 to 11 May 1962. Contrary to the advice of the then Chief Minister of Bihar, Shri Krishna Sinha, Governor Husain, who was also Chancellor of Patna University reappointed for a second term its serving Vice-Chancellor. In response, the state government considered amending the law to require the governor to appoint a vice-chancellor as advised by the chief minister. Husain however threatened to resign rather than assent to such an amendment forcing the government to drop its plans. In later appointments made as Vice-Chancellors of other state universities in Bihar, Husain accepted the advice of the Chief Minister in the exercise of his powers as Chancellor and acted accordingly although he was opposed to the appointment of non-academicians as vice chancellors to universities.

== Vice President & President ==
=== Vice President of India (1962–1967) ===
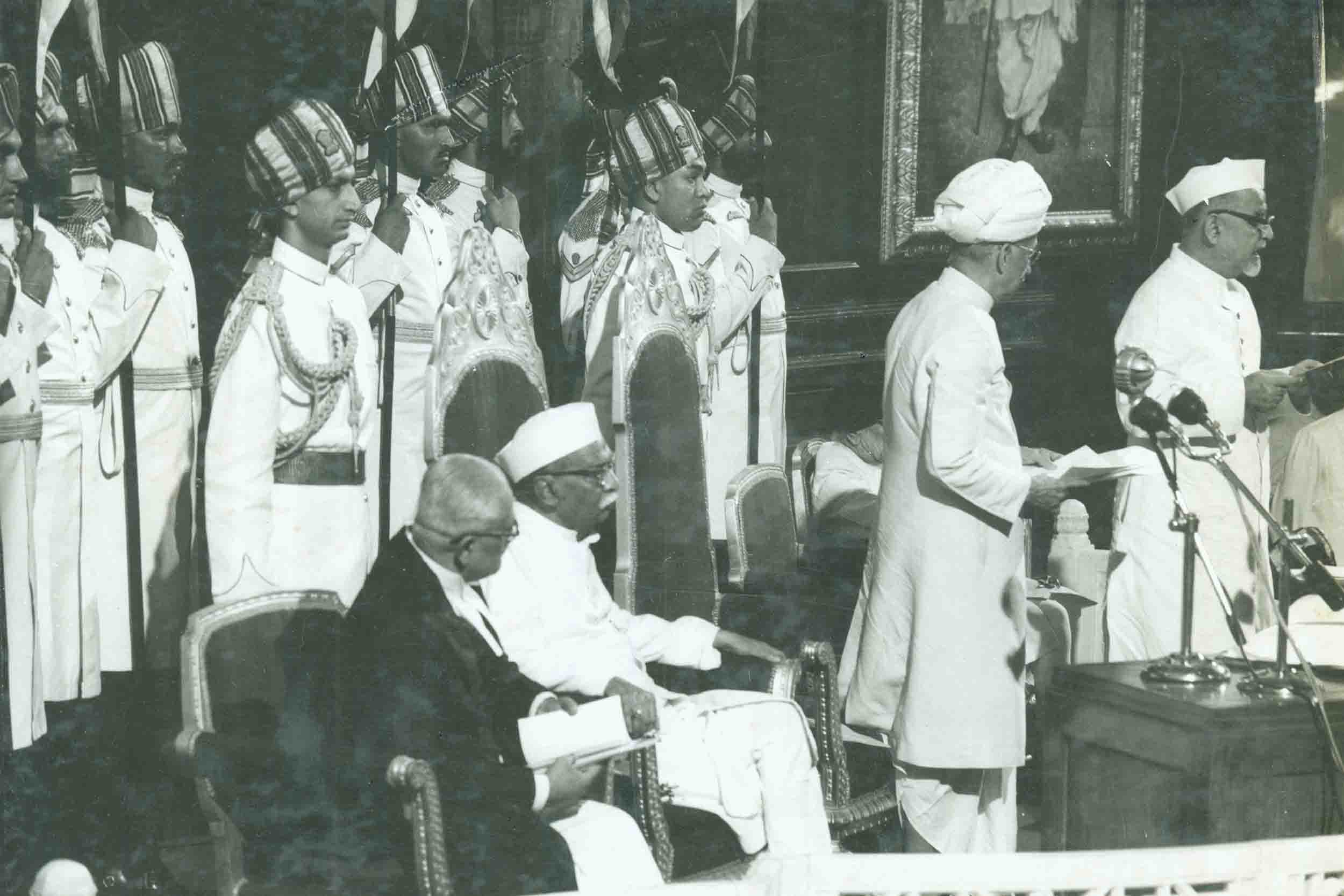
The newly elected President of India, S. Radhakrishnan, administering the oath of office of Vice President of India to Dr. Zakir Husain. Also in the picture is the outgoing president, Rajendra Prasad.

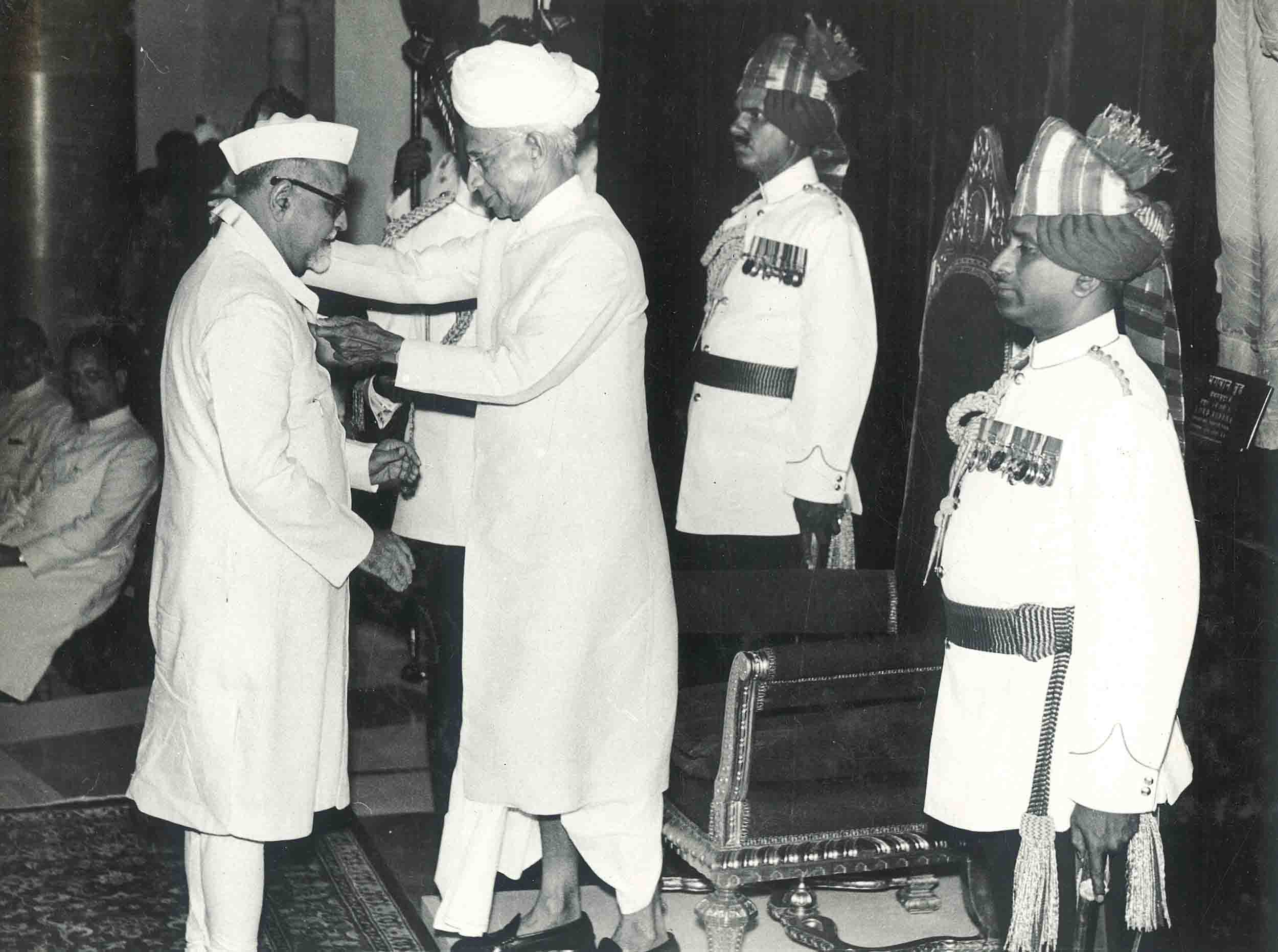
Husain receiving the Bharat Ratna from President S. Radhakrishnan.

==== Vice Presidential election ====
On 14 April 1962, the Congress party chose Husain to be its candidate for the upcoming election to the office of the Vice President of India. The election was held on 7 May 1962, and votes counted the same day. Husain won 568 of 596 votes cast while his only rival N. C. Samantsinhar won 14 votes. (Note: This was the first election for the vice presidency that was contested. In the elections of 1952 and 1957 S. Radhakrishnan was elected unopposed.) He was sworn in as vice president on 13 May 1962.

In 1962, Husain was nominated the Vice President of the Sahitya Akademi – a post held by his predecessor S. Radhakrishnan before his election as President of India. The following year, he was awarded the Bharat Ratna. In 1965 he served briefly as the acting president when President Radhakrishnan left for the United Kingdom to undergo treatment for cataract. It was during his acting presidency that President's rule was reimposed in Kerala after elections held there the previous month failed to give any party a majority and efforts by the Governor to facilitate the formation of a government collapsed.

As ex-officio Chairman of the Rajya Sabha, Husain gave rulings clarifying that Union ministers were entitled to speak in either house of parliament and that a sitting member of parliament who had been appointed as a Minister in a State would not be debarred from attending Parliament or voting in its debates until the member had been elected to the state legislature. In 1966, he ruled that parliamentary immunity from arrest would be limited to only civil cases and would not apply to criminal proceedings initiated against members.

=== President of India (1967–1969) ===
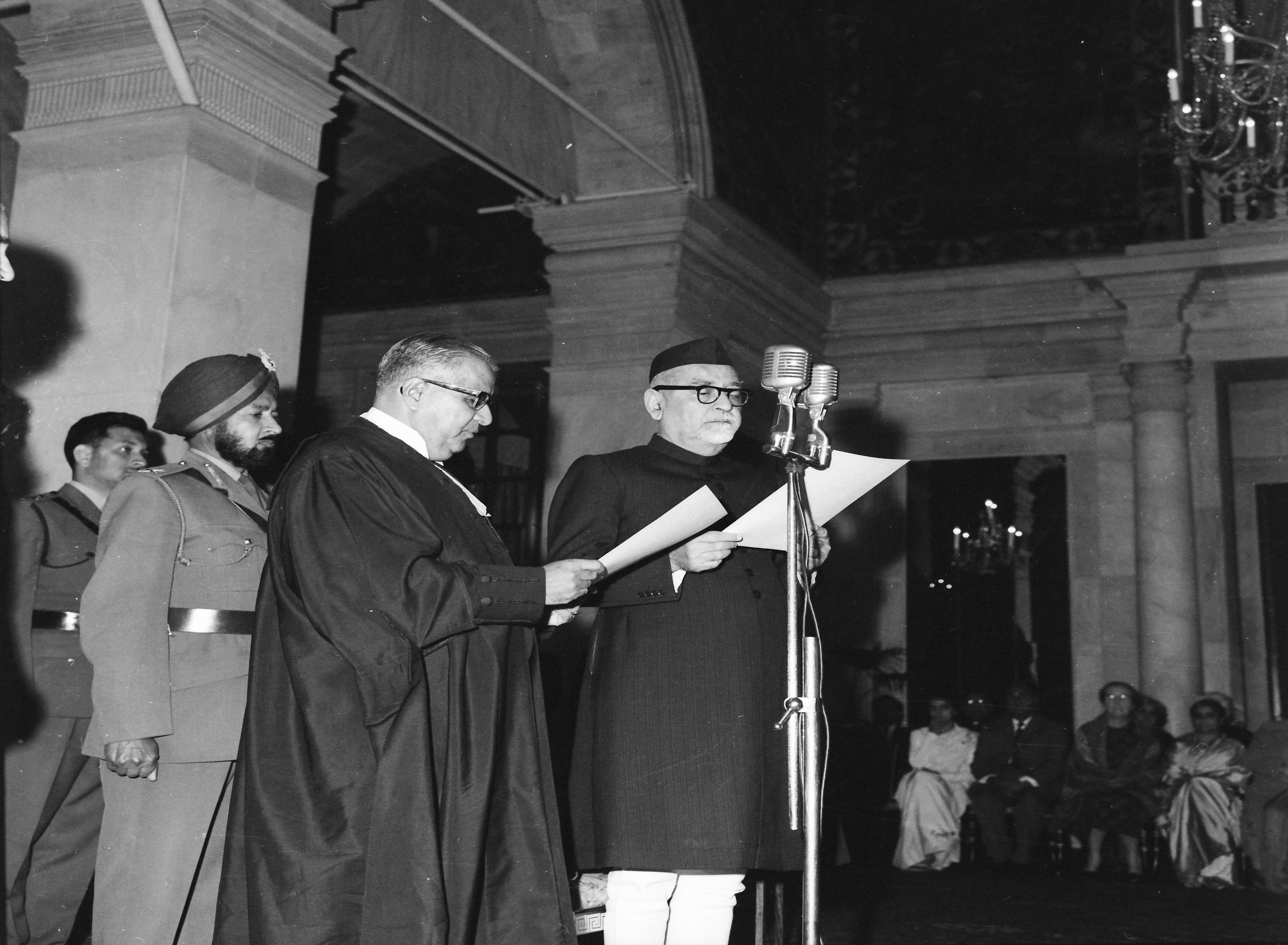
President Husain swearing in Justice Mohammad Hidayatullah as Chief Justice of India. ==== Presidential election ==== Following Husain's death, and Vice President V.V. Giri's resignation to contest the presidential election, Hidayatullah served as Acting President during 20 July 1969 – 24 August 1969.

Husain was chosen as the Congress party's candidate to succeed Sarvepalli Radhakrishnan as the President of India in the presidential election of 1967. There was a lack of enthusiasm for the candidature of Husain within the party, but Prime Minister Indira Gandhi chose to nominate him as the party candidate over objections raised by K. Kamaraj, the party president, and other senior members of her cabinet. A coalition of seven opposition parties got the sitting Chief Justice of India, Koka Subbarao to resign his post and contest the election as their joint candidate. Unlike the three previous presidential elections, the election of 1967 proved to be a real contest between the various candidates. The campaign was marred by communal rhetoric and accusations of sectarianism being made against Husain by the Jana Sangh party. There was also speculation that Husain would lose on account of cross voting against him by Congress legislators, an outcome which would have forced the Prime Minister to resign.

There were 17 candidates in the fray for the election held on 6 May 1967. Of these, nine failed to win any vote. Husain won 4,71,244 votes against the 3,63,971 received by Subbarao. The margin of 1,07,273 votes was much larger than what was expected by the Congress party with Husain winning the most votes in Parliament and in twelve state legislatures including three where the Congress Party sat in the opposition. The results of the presidential election, coming after the general elections of 1967 where the Congress party had suffered severe setbacks, were seen as strengthening Prime Minister Gandhi. Husain was declared elected on 9 May 1967. His election as president was seen domestically as the Congress Party's attempt to reach out to the Muslims of India who had voted against it in the general elections and globally as burnishing India's claim of being a secular nation.

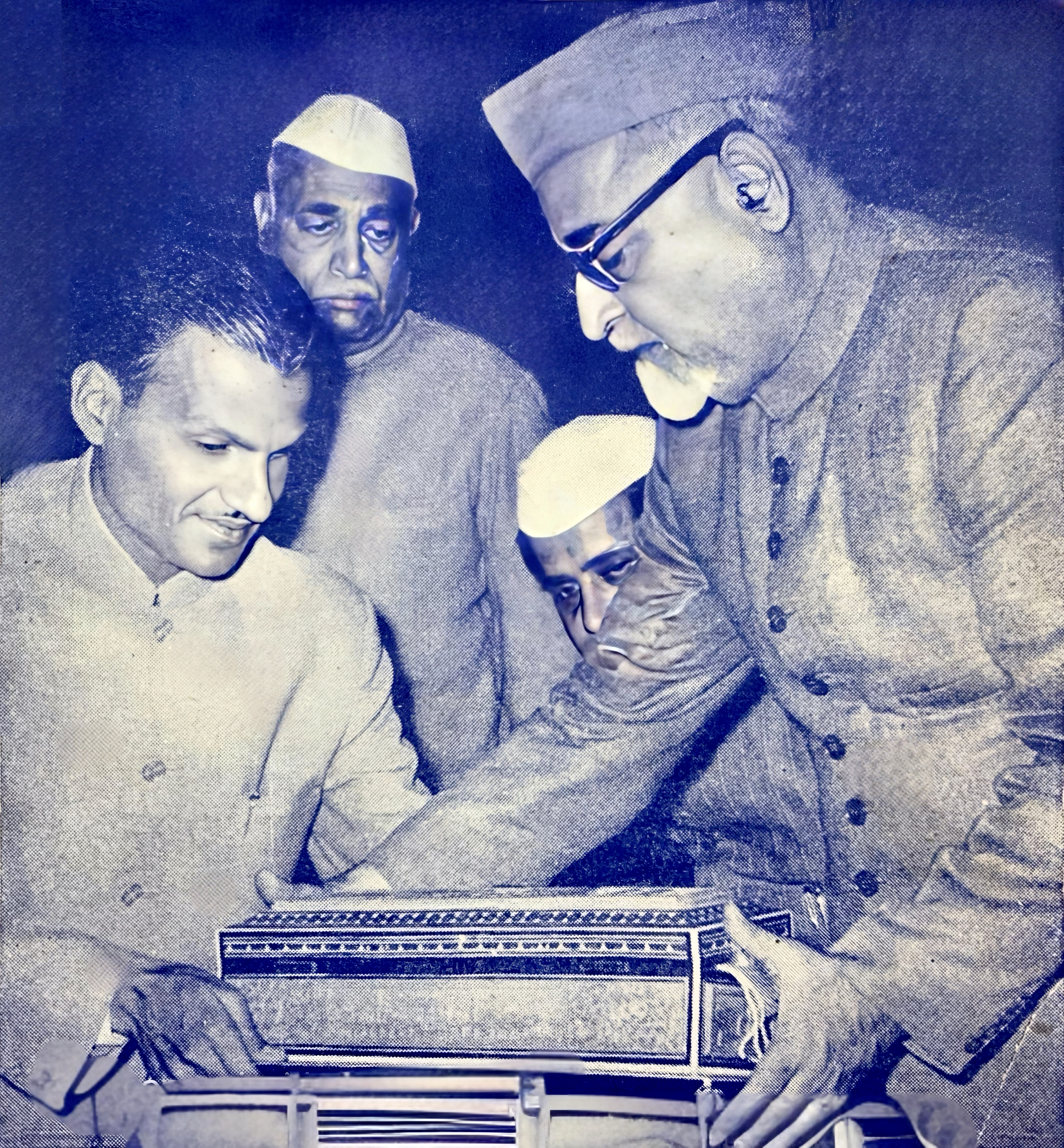
Zakir Hussain, then President of India, Narayan Prasad Shukla and Mishri Lal Gangwal, former Chief Minister of Madhya Bharat, during Indore visit.

Husain was sworn in on 13 May 1967. In a memorable inaugural address, while dedicating himself to the service of the Indian nation and its civilization, Husain said

The whole of Bharat is my home and its people are my family. The people have chosen to make me the head of this family for a certain time. It shall be my earnest endeavour to seek to make this home strong and beautiful, a worthy home for a great people engaged in the fascinating task of building up a just and prosperous and graceful life.

Husain was the first Muslim and the first governor of a state to be elected President of India. Husain's election was challenged before the Supreme Court of India on the grounds that the result of the election had been affected by undue influence exerted by the Prime Minister. The election petition filed by Baburao Patel was however dismissed by the court. During his presidential tenure, Husain led state visits to Canada, Hungary, Yugoslavia, USSR and Nepal. Husain, who had an interest in roses, is credited with having introduced several new varieties in the Mughal Gardens of the Rashtrapati Bhavan and building a glass conservatory for its collection of succulents.

== Author and translator ==
Husain wrote extensively in Urdu and also translated several books into that language. His translations include Friedrich List's National System of Economics, Edwin Cannan's Elements of Economics and Plato's Republic. He also wrote extensively on education in books such as Aala Taleem, Hindustan me Taleem ki az Sar-E-Nau Tanzeem, Qaumi Taleem and Taleemi Khutbat and on Urdu poets Altaf Hussain Hali in Hali: Muhibb-e-Watan and Mirza Ghalib in Intikhab-e-Ghalib. Husain wrote several stories for children which he published under a nom de plume. These include Uqab aur Doosri Kahaniyan and stories translated into English and published under The Magic Key series by Zubaan Books. Capitalism: An Essay in Understanding is a series of lectures he delivered at the Delhi University in 1946. His convocation addresses were published in 1965 as The Dynamic University. As President of India, Husain headed a committee to celebrate the Ghalib Centenary in 1969 which recommended the establishment of the Ghalib Institute as a memorial to Ghalib whereas the Ghalib Academy in Delhi was inaugurated by Husain in 1969.

== Death and legacy ==
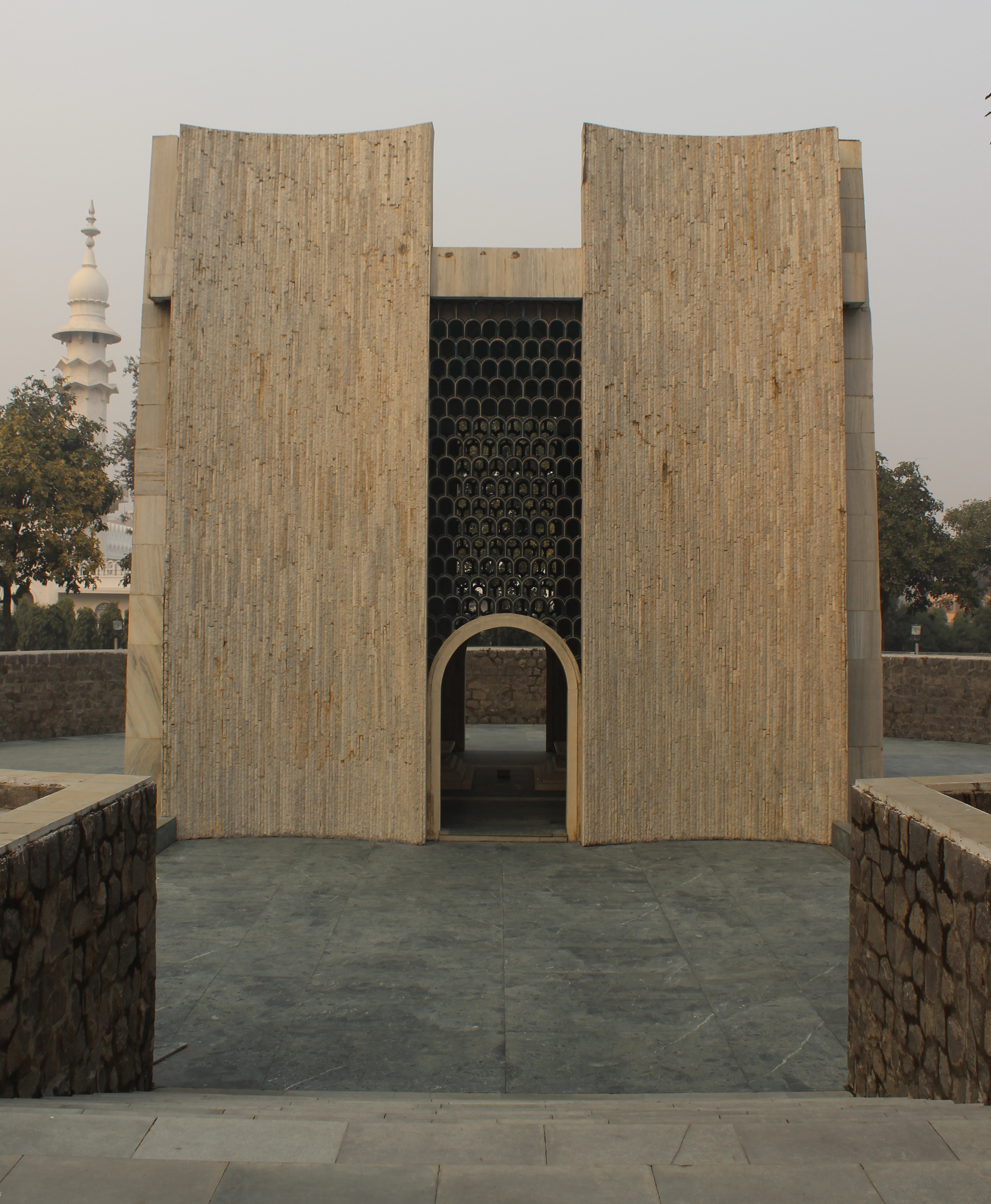
Husain's mausoleum in Jamia Millia Islamia was designed by architect Habib Rahman

Husain, who had suffered a mild heart attack earlier in the year, was unwell after returning to Delhi from a tour of Assam on 26 April 1969. He died in the Rashtrapati Bhavan on 3 May 1969 of a heart attack. Vice President V. V. Giri was sworn in as acting president the same day. The Government of India declared thirteen days of national mourning. His body lay in state in the Durbar Hall of the Rashtrapati Bhavan where an estimated 200,000 people paid their tributes. The funeral was held on 5 May 1969. He is buried in the university campus of the Jamia Millia Islamia where his body was taken in a gun carriage in a ceremonial funeral procession, after the janaza prayers and the national salute being offered at the Rashtrapati Bhavan. The United Arab Republic, Syria, Iraq, Libya, Sudan, Nepal, Bhutan and Trinidad and Tobago all declared several days' of mourning. Husain's death was mourned in Pakistan as well where flags flew at half mast on the day of his funeral. Pakistan's President Yahya Khan sent the Chief of Air Staff of Pakistan Air Force and Deputy Chief Martial Law Administrator Air Marshal Malik Nur Khan as his personal representative to the funeral. George Romney, Secretary of Housing and Urban Development, represented President Nixon and the United States whereas the Soviet Union was represented by its Prime Minister Alexei Kosygin. The Prime Ministers of Yugoslavia, Afghanistan and Nepal too attended the funeral. Up to a million people are thought to have lined the streets as the funeral cortege made its way to the burial ground. Husain was the first President to die in office and has served the shortest tenure in office.

Husain's tomb was built in 1971 and was designed by Habib Rahman. Its architecture reflects the influence of Bauhaus aesthetics on traditional Indian styles as seen in its eight curved, reinforced concrete walls topped by rough cut marble which have been inspired by Tughluq tombs. These tapering walls stand along a square plan to form an open structure topped by a shallow dome. The tomb has no ornamentation but features jalis and arches. The graves of Husain and his wife lie under the dome of the tomb.

=== Commemoration ===
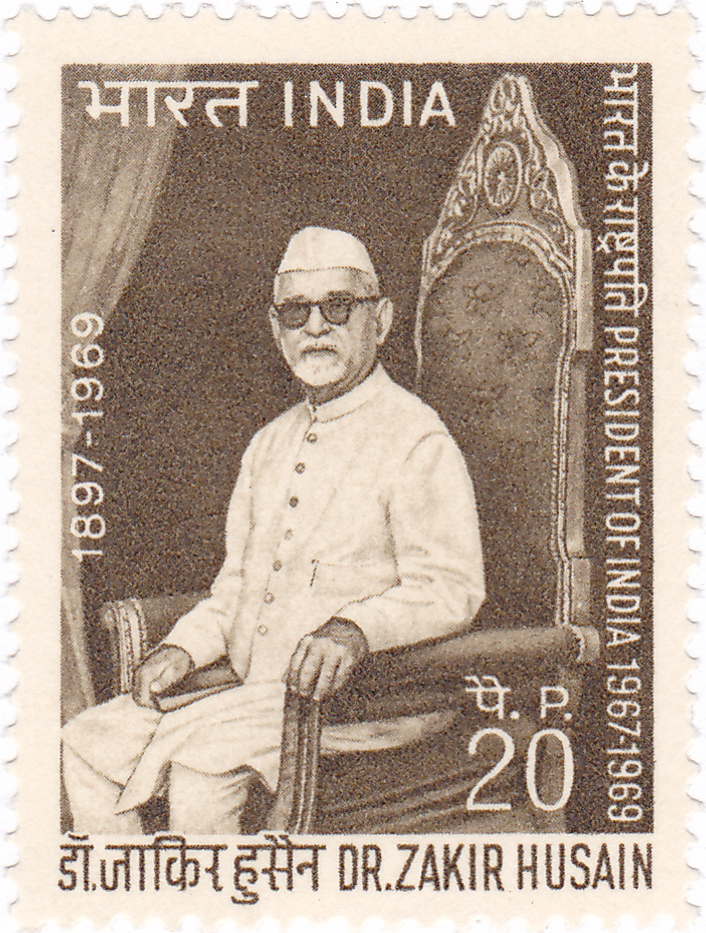
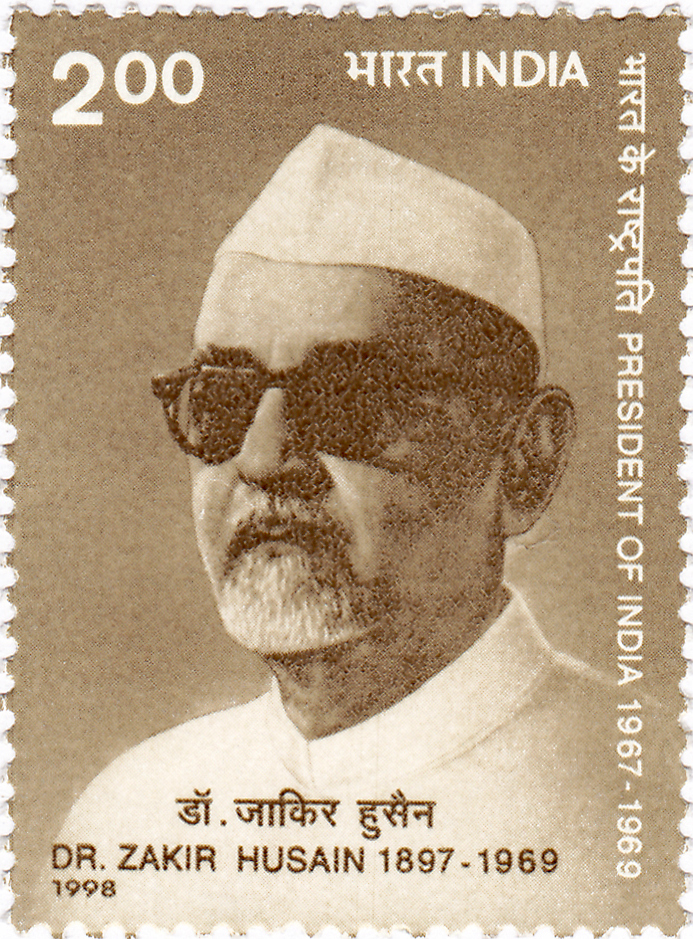
Indian postage stamps commemorating Husain in 1969 (left) and 1998 (right).

Commemorative postage stamps on Husain were issued by India Post in 1969 and 1998. A Rose Called Zakir Husain – A Life of Dedication is a 1969 documentary film on the life of Husain produced by the Films Division of India. In 1975 the Delhi College, a constituent college of the Delhi University, was renamed the Zakir Husain Delhi College. The Zakir Husain Centre for Educational Studies at the Jawaharlal Nehru University and the Dr. Zakir Husain Central Library of the Jamia Millia Islamia are also named after him. Delhi's Wellesley Road was renamed the Dr. Zakir Husain Marg. The Zakir Hussain Rose Garden in Chandigarh, which is Asia's largest rose garden, is also named after Husain. Dr. Zakir Hussain – Teacher who became President, a book on Husain by the Indian Council for Cultural Relations, was released in 2000.

== Awards and honours ==
- India:
  - Bharat Ratna (1963)
  - Padma Vibhushan (1954)

== See also ==
- List of heads of state and government who died in office
- List of Padma Vibhushan award recipients

== Notes ==
Academic offices
Preceded by Zahid Husain	Vice-Chancellor of Aligarh Muslim University; 1948–1956	Succeeded by Bashir Hussain Zaidi
Political offices
Preceded by R. R. Diwakar	Governor of Bihar; 1957–1962	Succeeded by M. A. Ayyangar
Preceded by Sarvepalli Radhakrishnan	Vice President of India; 1962–1967	Succeeded by Varahagiri Venkata Giri
Preceded by Sarvepalli Radhakrishnan	President of India; 1967–1969	Succeeded by Varahagiri Venkata Giri
