= 1962 Indian vice presidential election =

Vice-presidential election in India

| ← 1957 | 7 May 1962 | 1967 → |
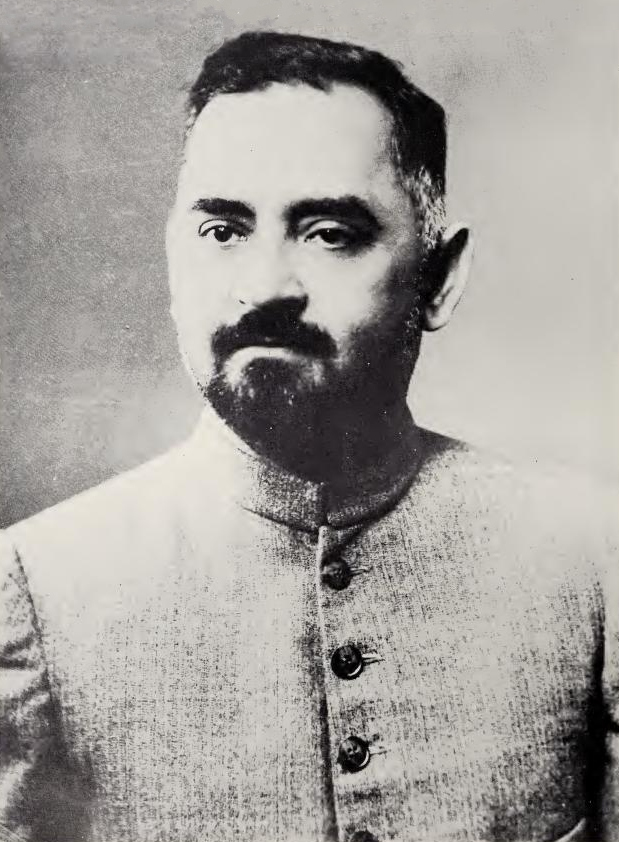

| Nominee | Zakir Husain | N. C. Samantsinhar |
| Party | Independent | Independent |
| Home state | Uttar Pradesh (Telangana, then united Andhra) | Orissa |
| Electoral vote | 568 | 14 |
| Percentage | 97.59% | 2.41% |
Vice President before election
Sarvepalli Radhakrishnan
Independent
Elected Vice President
Zakir Husain
Independent

The 1962 Indian vice presidential election was held in 7 May 1962 to elect the vice president of India. Zakir Husain was elected for the post. This was the first contested election for Vice Presidency in India, as the first two elections were uncontested, with Sarvepalli Radhakrishnan being the only candidate. He won against N. C. Samantsinhar by a landslide.

== Results ==
Result of the Indian vice-presidential election, 1967
| Candidate | Electoral Votes | % of Votes |
|---|---|---|
| Zakir Husain | 568 | 97.59 |
| N. C. Samantsinhar | 14 | 2.41 |
| Total | 582 | 100.00 |
| Valid Votes | 582 | 97.65 |
| Invalid Votes | 14 | 2.35 |
| Turnout | 596 | 80.00 |
| Abstentions | 149 | 20.00 |
| Electors | 745 | |

== See also ==
- 1962 Indian presidential election
