= Mahmud Husain =

Pakistani academic and politician (1907–1975)

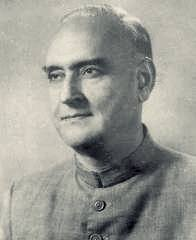

Minister for Education
- In office 4 February 1953 – 17 April 1953
- Prime Minister: Khawaja Nazimuddin
- Preceded by: Fazlur Rahman
- Succeeded by: Ishtiaq Hussain Qureshi

Minister for Kashmir Affairs
- In office 26 November 1951 – 17 April 1953
- Prime Minister: Khawaja Nazimuddin
- Preceded by: Mushtaq Ahmed Gurmani
- Succeeded by: Shuaib Qureshi

Minister of State for States and Frontier Regions
- In office 24 October 1950 – 24 October 1951
- Prime Minister: Liaquat Ali Khan

Deputy Minister for Defense, Foreign Affairs and Finance
- In office 3 February 1949 – 24 October 1950
- Prime Minister: Liaquat Ali Khan

Member of the Constituent Assembly of Pakistan
- In office 10 August 1947 – 24 October 1954
- Constituency: East Bengal

Personal details
- Born: 15 July 1907: Qaimganj, Agra and Oudh, British India
- Died: 10 April 1975 (aged 67) Karachi, Sindh, Pakistan
- Party: Muslim League
- Relatives: Zakir Husain (brother); Yusuf Husain (brother); Rahimuddin (son-in-law)
- Education: Jamia Millia Islamia (BA); Heidelberg University; (PhD)
- Fields: Contemporary history; International relations; Social sciences
- Institutions: University of Karachi; University of Dhaka; University of Pennsylvania; Columbia University; Heidelberg University

Mahmud Husain Khan (15 July 1907 – 10 April 1975) was a Pakistani historian, educationist, and politician, known for his role in the Pakistan Movement, and for pioneering the study of social sciences. He served as Minister for Kashmir Affairs from 1951 to 1953 and Minister for Education in 1953, as well as minister of state in Pakistan's first cabinet under Prime Minister Liaquat Ali Khan.

As a member of the country's first Constituent Assembly, Husain served on Muhammad Ali Jinnah's parliamentary committee for fundamental rights and minorities. He refused to rejoin the cabinet when Governor-General Ghulam Muhammad dismissed the Nazimuddin ministry. He played a key role in authoring the draft Constitution of 1954 and attempting to curtail the governor-general's powers, after which Ghulam Muhammad dissolved the assembly.

Returning to academia, Husain served as vice-chancellor of Dhaka University, resigning in 1963 when Ayub Khan's military dictatorship sought disciplinary action against student protestors. A proponent of greater rights for East Bengal and later East Pakistan, now Bangladesh, Husain emerged as a vocal but unsuccessful critic of West Pakistan's policies towards its eastern wing.

He later served as vice-chancellor of University of Karachi until his death in 1975. He founded Jamia Milia Islamia, Malir, modelled on the university of the same name in India founded by his brother, Zakir Husain. University of Karachi renamed its library in his memory in 1976.

== Early life and family ==
Mahmud Husain was born in Qaimganj, United Provinces, British India to Fida Husain Khan, a lawyer, and Naznin Begum. The youngest of seven sons, he was the brother of Dr Zakir Husain, the third President of India, and scholar and historian Yusuf Husain. He was also the father of television compere Anwar Husain, uncle of academic Masud Husain Khan, and the father-in-law of General Rahimuddin Khan, the Governor of Balochistan. Mahmud Husain's family were ethnic Afridi Pashtuns whose roots were in Kohat and Tirah, Khyber Pakhtunkhwa. His ancestor Husain Khan migrated from Kohat to Qaimganj in 1715.

Husain attended Islamia High School, Etawah and Aligarh Government High School. He was part of the first batch of students to be admitted into the newly established Jamia Milia Islamia, where he was heavily influenced by the ideas of Maulana Muhammad Ali Jauhar. He received his PhD from the University of Heidelberg in Germany in 1932.

Mahmud Husain started his career in academia as a reader of modern history at the University of Dhaka in 1933, where he became provost, Fazlul Haq Hall in 1944 and professor of international relations in 1948.

== Political career ==
=== Pakistan Movement ===
Unlike his brother Zakir Husain, Mahmud Husain had been a strong proponent of the Pakistan Movement, and catalysed support for Pakistan among students in East Bengal and at Dhaka University. On Direct Action Day in 1946, Husain was charged with leading the pro-Pakistan rally in Dhaka.

=== Member of the Constituent Assembly ===
He was elected Member of the first Constituent Assembly of Pakistan from East Bengal on the platform of Muslim League, and also elected Secretary of the Muslim League's Parliamentary Group. He was included by Prime Minister Liaquat Ali Khan in the Basic Principles Committee, the main parliamentary group charged with drafting the underlying principles of the Constitution of Pakistan. He also served on the committee of minorities and fundamental rights.

=== Liaquat ministry ===
Husain was appointed both Deputy Minister for Defense and Foreign Affairs in the cabinet of Prime Minister Liaquat in 1949, before becoming State Minister for State and Frontier Regions a year later. He was appointed chairman of the five-member Balochistan Reforms Committee by Liaquat on 4 October 1950; the committee submitted its report to the assembly after extensive tours of the province. It proposed provincial autonomy and raising Balochistan to the status of Governor's province, the introduction of adult franchise and local bodies, and greater provincial autonomy. Termed a 'remarkable document', it was opposed by the centre. Following the assassination of Liaquat Ali Khan, Khawaja Nazimuddin assumed the post of prime minister.

=== Nazimuddin ministry ===
In the Nazimuddin ministry, Husain served as Minister for Kashmir Affairs from 26 November 1951, and was handed the additional portfolio of Minister for Education on 4 February 1953. Following anti-Ahmadiyya riots in 1953, martial law was imposed in Lahore, and Governor-General Ghulam Muhammad dismissed Nazimuddin's government soon after. Husain along with Sardar Abdur Rab Nishtar and Abdul Sattar Pirzada refused to join the new cabinet constituted by Ghulam Muhammad.

=== Move against governor-general's powers ===
On 21 September 1954, Mahmud Husain was part of the Muslim League parliamentary group, along with party leaders Nazimuddin and Fazlur Rahman, that passed the Fifth Amendment to the Government of India Act, 1935, stripping Governor-General Ghulam Muhammad of his powers to dissolve parliament and remove the prime minister. The session was presided over by Speaker Maulvi Tamizuddin Khan. The Constituent Assembly also finalised and adopted the Report of the Basic Principles Committee on the same day, aiming to promulgate the report as the Constitution of Pakistan at the next session on 27 October.

On 24 October, three days before parliament was to promulgate the new Constitution, Ghulam Muhammad dissolved the Constituent Assembly. Mahmud Husain formally retired from politics afterward.

== Academic career ==
After the independence of Pakistan in 1947, Husain, inspired by the old Jamia Millia Islamia, New Delhi, India, played a key role in establishing an educational society, Majlis-i-Taleem-i-Milli Pakistan, in 1948, which served as the parent body of the Jamia Millia Educational Complex located in Malir, Karachi. In 1947, he was one of the pioneers in establishing Department of International Relations in University of Dhaka, the first IR department among South Asian Universities. Later in the early 1950s, many educational institutions were built at this Malir educational complex. He joined Karachi University as its first professor of international relations and history. He also began the faculties of journalism and library science, the first in Pakistan. Husain also laid the foundation of the Library Association in 1957 and served as its president for fifteen years.

Husain taught as visiting professor at his alma mater Heidelberg University (1963–64), Columbia University (1964–65) and University of Pennsylvania (1965–66).

=== Vice-Chancellor of Dhaka University ===
Husain returned to academia in 1954, after the dissolution of the Constituent Assembly. A known supporter of greater rights for East Pakistan, he was appointed vice-chancellor of the University of Dacca in 1960. During his tenure, Husain refused government requests to intervene in mass student protests against President Ayub Khan and martial law, culminating in his resignation on 12 February 1963. During and after his tenure, he became a vocal critic of the government's handling of East Pakistan, and urged integration. He strongly opposed the army operation in East Pakistan in 1971 but to no avail.

=== Vice-Chancellor of Karachi University ===
In 1966, Husain went back to the University of Karachi as professor of history and worked there as the dean of its Faculty of Arts until 1971. He served as vice-chancellor of the University of Karachi from 1971 to 1975. He died while serving as vice-chancellor on 10 April 1975.

== Works ==
Husain was fluent in Urdu, English, German, and Persian, writing primarily in the Urdu language. His Urdu translations are Mahida-i-Imrani (1935) from Jean-Jacques Rousseau's Social Contract, and Badshah (1947), a translation of Machiavelli's The Prince. His other books include The Quest for an Empire (1937), and Fatah-i-Mujahideen (1950), an Urdu translation of Zainul Abideen Shustri's Persian treatise on Tipu Sultan. He was also editor of the A History of the Freedom Movement.

His best-known work is his English translation of Tipu's diaries from the original Persian, The Dreams of Tipu Sultan.

== Eponyms ==
- Dr. Mahmud Husain Road, Jamshed Town, Karachi 24°52′21″N 67°3′54″E
- Mahmud Husain Library: On 12 April 1976, a year after his death, the Karachi University Syndicate renamed the Karachi University Library as the Dr. Mahmud Husain Library by unanimous resolution.

== See also ==
- List of vice chancellors of Dhaka University
