= Nazir Ahmed (scholar) =

Indian scholar and teacher

- Born: 3 January 1915; Kolhuee Gareeb, (Gorra) Gonda
- Died: 19 October 2008 (aged 93); Aligarh
- Resting place: Aligarh Muslim University Graveyard
- Occupations: Indian Scholar and Writer
- Children: Professor Rehana Khatoon
- Awards: Padma Shri Award by the Government of India in 1987, Ghalib Award, Presidential Award and Lifetime Fellowship, Khusro Award, Hafez Sanaash, Jaizah Afshar

Nazir Ahmed (1915-2008) was an Indian scholar, writer, and teacher of the Persian language. He was honoured by the Indian Government in 1987 with the Padma Shri award. He received this award for his contributions to the propagation of Persian Language and literature.

== Early life and education ==
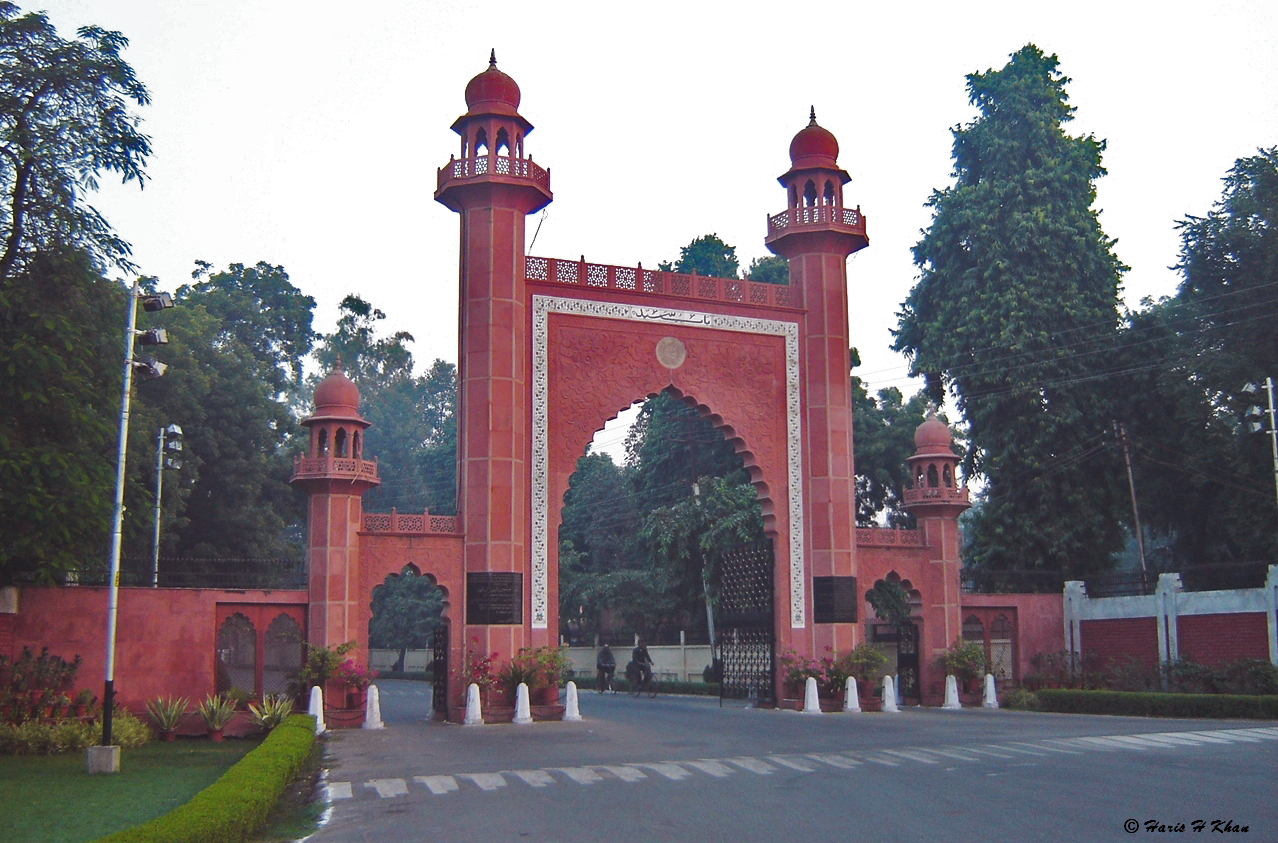
Aligarh Muslim University where Dr. Nazir Ahmed worked

Nazir Ahmed was born on 3 January 1915, in the small hamlet of Kolahi Gharib (Ghurrah/Gorra), near Gonda, in Uttar Pradesh, India.

He attended a local primary school from which he graduated in 1930. He then attended Gonda High School to complete his matriculation in the first division, along with a distinction in mathematics in 1934. Subsequently, he joined Lucknow Christian College and completed his intermediary and Munshi examinations in 1936, and went on to secure a BA (Hons) in Persia in 1939, with first rank and first division. He completed his master's degree in 1940, acquiring a first rank, which earned him two gold medals and a scholarship for higher studies.

== Career ==
Ahmed started his career as a teacher at the Deoria Government High School, in Uttar Pradesh, immediately after the completion of his master's degree. He continued working there until he was transferred in 1943 to Basti Government High School. Professor Ahmed taught at the school for ten years, which he utilized for higher studies by pursuing research in Persia and enrolling for a PhD under the guidance of Prof. Masood Hasan Rizvi. He went on to earn his Doctoral degree in Zahoori (Tarshezi), in 1945. He continued his research by registering for D.Litt at the Lucknow University, and his thesis on the Persian poets of the Aadil-Shah period earned him the degree of D.Litt in 1950.

Ahmed joined University of Lucknow as a lecturer in 1950 and continued his research and studies by securing a diploma in Farsi Baastan-e-Pahlawi and Modern Persian from the University of Teheran. He earned a second D.Litt, this time in Urdu, from Lucknow University for his research on Nauras of Adil Shah in 1956. After seven years of teaching at the Lucknow University, Nazir Ahmed moved to Aligarh Muslim University in 1957, as the Assistant Director of Aligarh-Taareekh-e-Urdu Adab, on invitation from the then Vice-Chancellor of AMU, Col. Bashir Zaidi. A year later in 1958, he became the Reader in the Department of Persian Language. In 1960, he became a Professor and Chairman of the department.

At AMU, Ahmed founded the quarterly journal, Fikro-Nazar, along with Professor Yousuf Hussain Khan, and served as its founding secretary. However, during the students' unrest of 1965 on minority issue, Professor Ahmed's life suffered a minor setback when his eldest son, Abdul Basit, got embroiled in the movement and got expelled from the University which resulted in Professor Ahmed's exit from the editorial board of the journal. In 1969, Ahmed became the Dean of the Faculty of Arts and retired from AMU service in 1977, when he was made the Professor Emeritus.

== Death and legacy ==
Nazir Ahmad died on October 19, 2008, in Aligarh at age 93. He inspired his daughter, Rehana Khatoon, to follow in his footsteps and she eventually became a Padma Shri winner and a scholar in her own right. Professor Ahmed's remains were buried in the Aligarh Muslim University graveyard.

Ahmed left a legacy by way of his students such as Prof. Azarmi Dukht Safavi, Prof. S. M. Tariq Hasan and Prof. Khalid Siddiqi. Through his studies on Mirza Ghalib. Nazir Ahmed claimed that Mirza Ghalib had been influenced by Bedil and Abul Fazal from the Mughal emperor Aurangzeb's ruling period, though Mirza Ghalib himself achieved literary success through his own creative brilliance.

== Positions held ==
Nazir Ahmed has contributed to the propagation of the Persian language in more than one ways. He served in many academic committees and editorial boards of many Persian journals. He was a member of the editorial board of Ma-arif, a monthly journal published by the Darul Musannefin Shibli Academy Azamgarh. After taking part in the First International Conference on Amir Khusro held in Chicago in 1988, at the request of the Amir Khusro Society of America (AKSA), Professor Ahmed led a team of scholars in a project funded by the Smithsonian. This project was tasked with translating the works of Amir Khusro, with the support from Hakim Abdul Hameed, the founder of Jamia Hamdard of New Delhi and former Chancellor of Aligarh Muslim University. In connection with the UNESCO announcement declaring the year 1988 as the Year of Hafez, Professor Ahmed edited and published two old manuscripts by the 14th-century Persian mystic and poet.

== Awards and recognitions ==
Ahmed was awarded the Padma Shri, in 1987. Twenty seven years later, his daughter, Rehana Khatoon would also be honored by the Government of India with a Padma Shri award in 2014.

He has also received many other awards such as:

- Ghalib Award - Ghalib Institute of New Delhi — 1976
- Presidential Award and Lifetime Fellowship — President of India - 1977
- Khusro Award - Amir Khusro Society of America (AKSA) - 1987
- Hafez Shanaas award — Iranian Cultural Council of India - 1988
- Jaizah Afshar award — Government of Iran - 1989
- DLitt (Honoris Causa) - University of Tehran, Iran — 1990

== Publications ==
Some of the notable works of Ahmed are:

- Nazir Ahmed. Zahoori - Life and Work. Aligarh.
- Nazir Ahmed. Tahqeeqi Maqaley (in Urdu). Aligarh.
- Nazir Ahmed. Nauras (in Urdu). Aligarh.
- Nazir Ahmed. Nauras. Aligarh.
- Nazir Ahmed. Makaateeb Sanashi (in Persian). Aligarh.
- Nazir Ahmed. Tareekh aur Adabi Mutaaley (in Urdu). Aligarh.
- Nazir Ahmed. Beewan-e-Hafiz (in Persian). Aligarh.
- Nazir Ahmed. Farhang Qawaas (in Persian). Aligarh.
- Nazir Ahmed. Dasturul Afzal (in Persian). Aligarh.
- Nazir Ahmed. Kitabus Sidna (in Persian). Aligarh.
- Nazir Ahmed. Deewan Saraji (in Persian). Aligarh.
- Nazir Ahmed. Taarekh aur Ilmi Maqalat (in Urdu). Aligarh.
- Nazir Ahmed. Naqd Qatey Burhan (in Urdu). Aligarh.
- Nazir Ahmed. Deewan Ameed Lawaiki (in Persian). Aligarh.
- Nazir Ahmed. Zafaan Goya (in Persian). Aligarh.
- Nazir Ahmed. Fazala-e-Balakh (in Urdu). Aligarh.
- Nazir Ahmed. Ghalib per Chand Maqaley (in Urdu). Aligarh.
- Nazir Ahmed. Farsi Qaseedah Nigari (in Persian). Aligarh.

== See also ==
- Professor Rehana Khatoon
- Mirza Ghalib
- Amir Khusro
