= Zakir Husain Rose Garden =

Botanical garden in Chandigarh, India

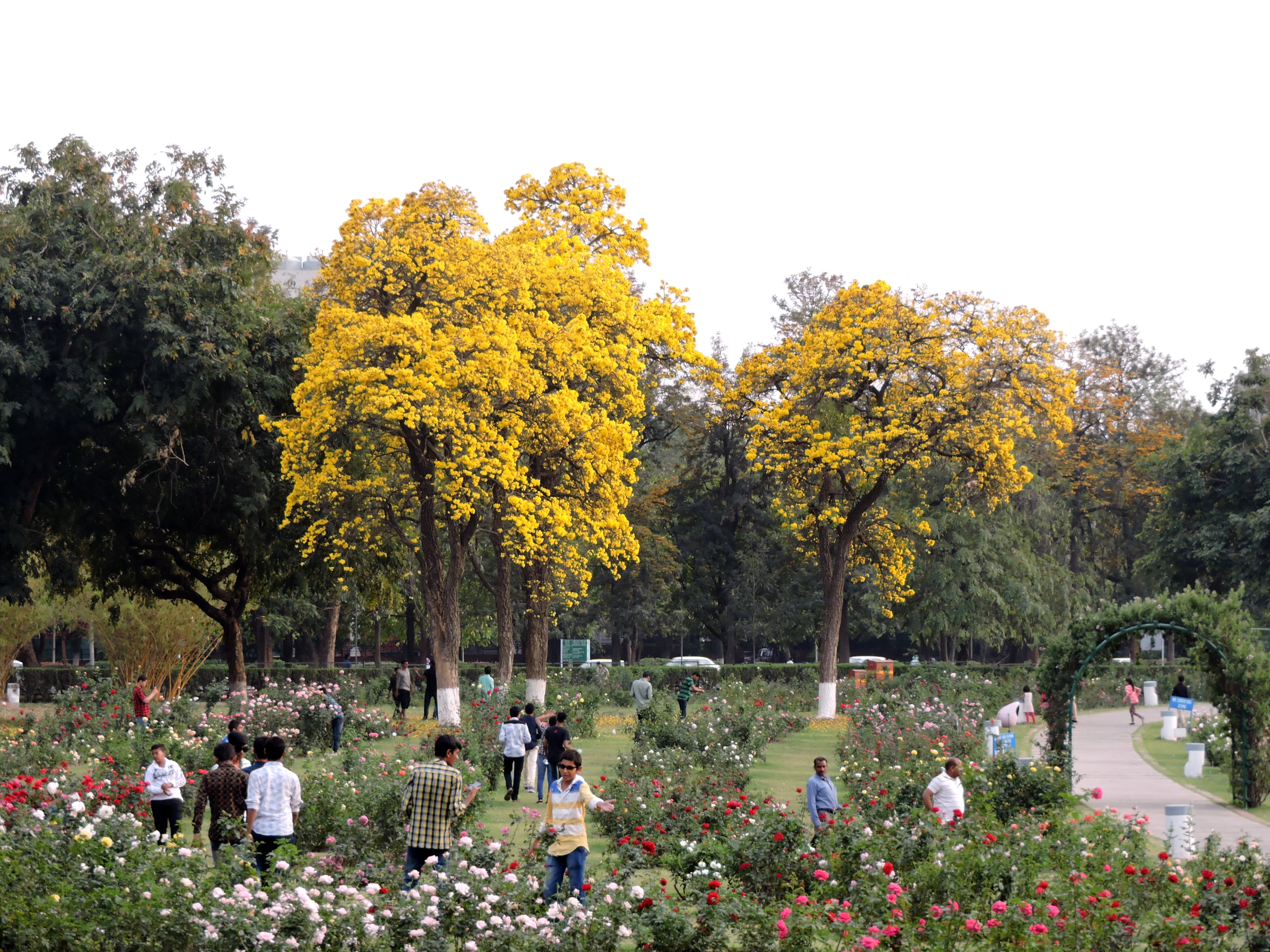
- Zakir Husain Rose Garden
- Interactive map of Zakir Husain Rose Garden
- Type: Park and tourist spot
- Location: Sector 16, Chandigarh
- Coordinates: 30°44′46″N 76°46′55″E
- Area: 30 acres (12 ha)
- Opened: 1967
- Founder: Mohinder Singh Randhawa the then UT Administrator
- Owner: Chandigarh Administration
- Operator: Chandigarh Administration
- Species: 1600 species of roses
- Collections: 50 thousand plants of roses
- Website: chandigarh.gov.in

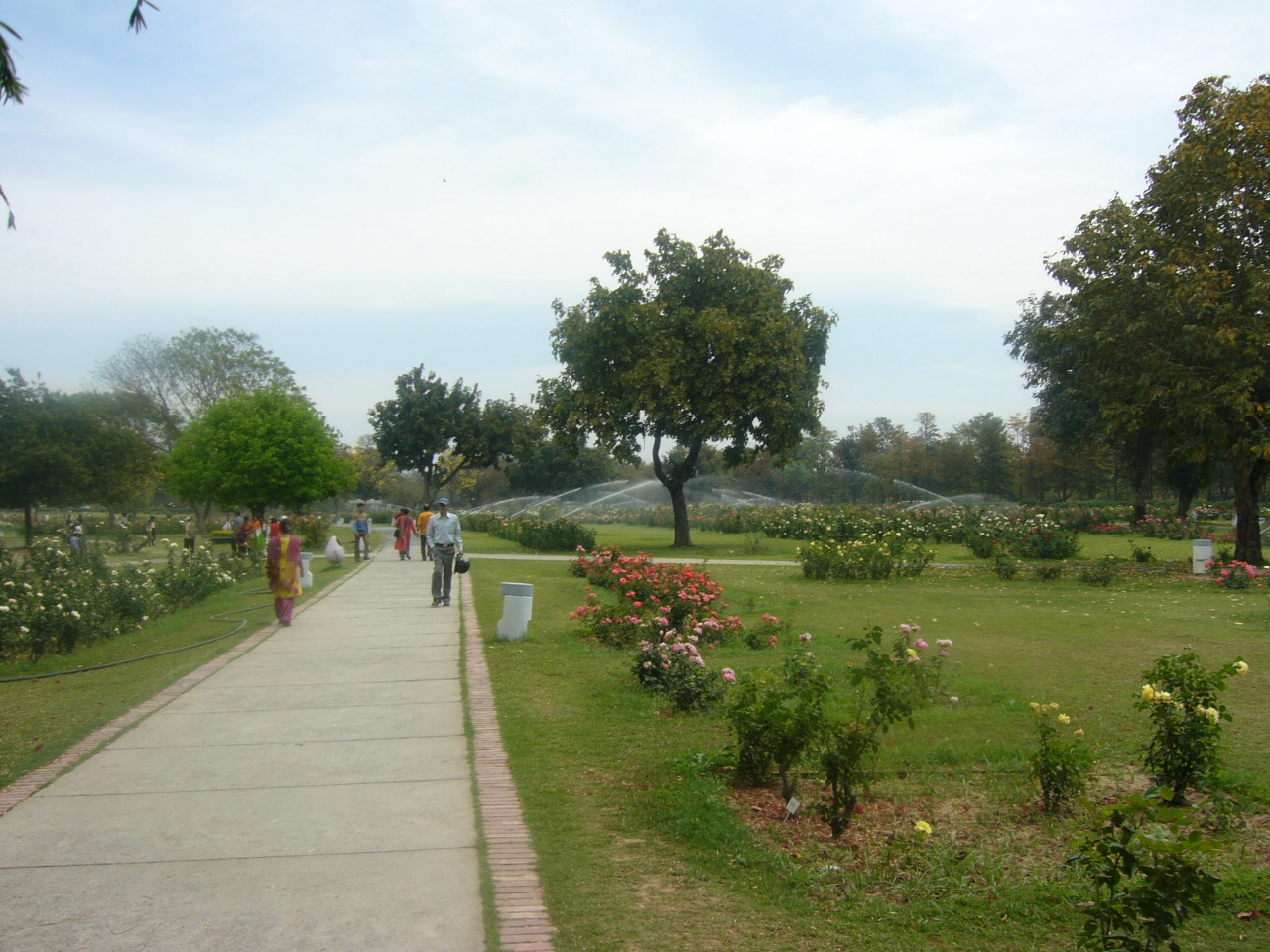
The Rose Garden

Zakir Husain Rose Garden, is a botanical garden located in Chandigarh, India and spread over 30 acres (120,000 m^{2}) of land, with 50,000 rose-bushes of 1600 different species. Some important Rose species in this Garden are the Royal William Rose, Europa-Rosarium, Rosa Gallica, Beach Rose, Rosa chinensis, Centifolia roses, Rosa glauca. Named after India's former president, Zakir Husain and created in 1967 under the guidance of Mohinder Singh Randhawa, Chandigarh's first chief commissioner, the garden has the distinction of being Asia's largest. The garden has not only roses but also trees of medicinal value. Some of the medicinal plants that can be spotted here are bel, bahera, harar, camphor and yellow gulmohar. The rose plants have been planted in carved-out lawns and flower beds. The garden is open year-round, with peak bloom occurring from December to February, attracting thousands of visitors during the annual Rose Festival.

Rose Garden has undergone several renovations and expansions. In 2003, a new section was added to the garden, which included a bonsai garden and a cactus house. In 2013, a rose festival was held at the garden to celebrate the 100th anniversary of the Indian Horticulture Society .The rose garden is also called "The Floral Wonderland "

Apart from serving as a host of other events, the Zakir Husain Rose Garden serves as the venue for hosting an annual rose festival called Rose Festival, a major cultural event in Chandigarh during February or March. Celebrated mainly as a tribute to the magnificence of the rose itself, the attractions include food, drinks, joyrides, and contests of varying nature, such as photography, gardening, landscaping, bonsai, and Rose Prince and Princess. The contests are open to the residents or institutions from nearby places.

== Gallery ==
March 2016

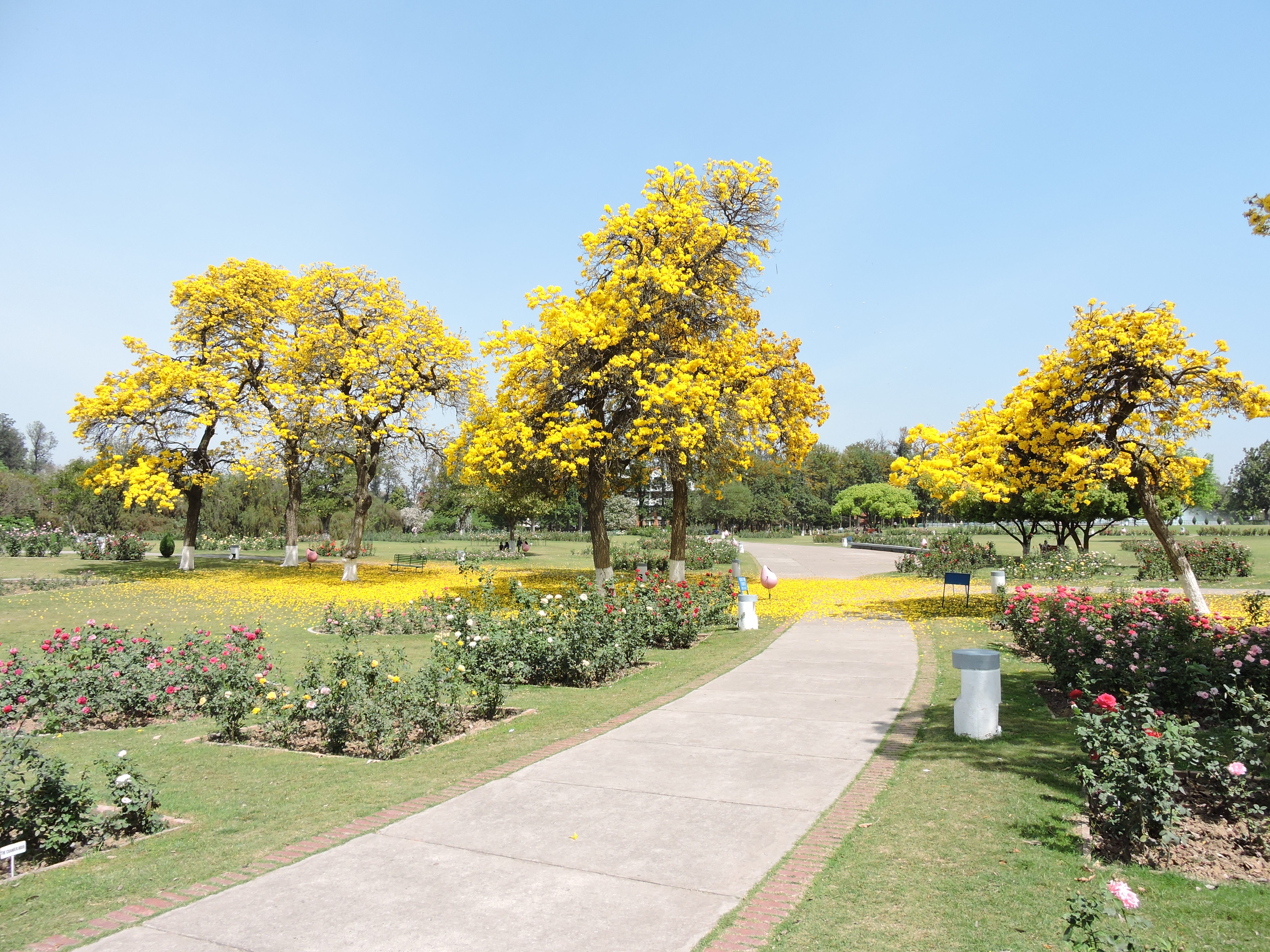
Roses in the garden.

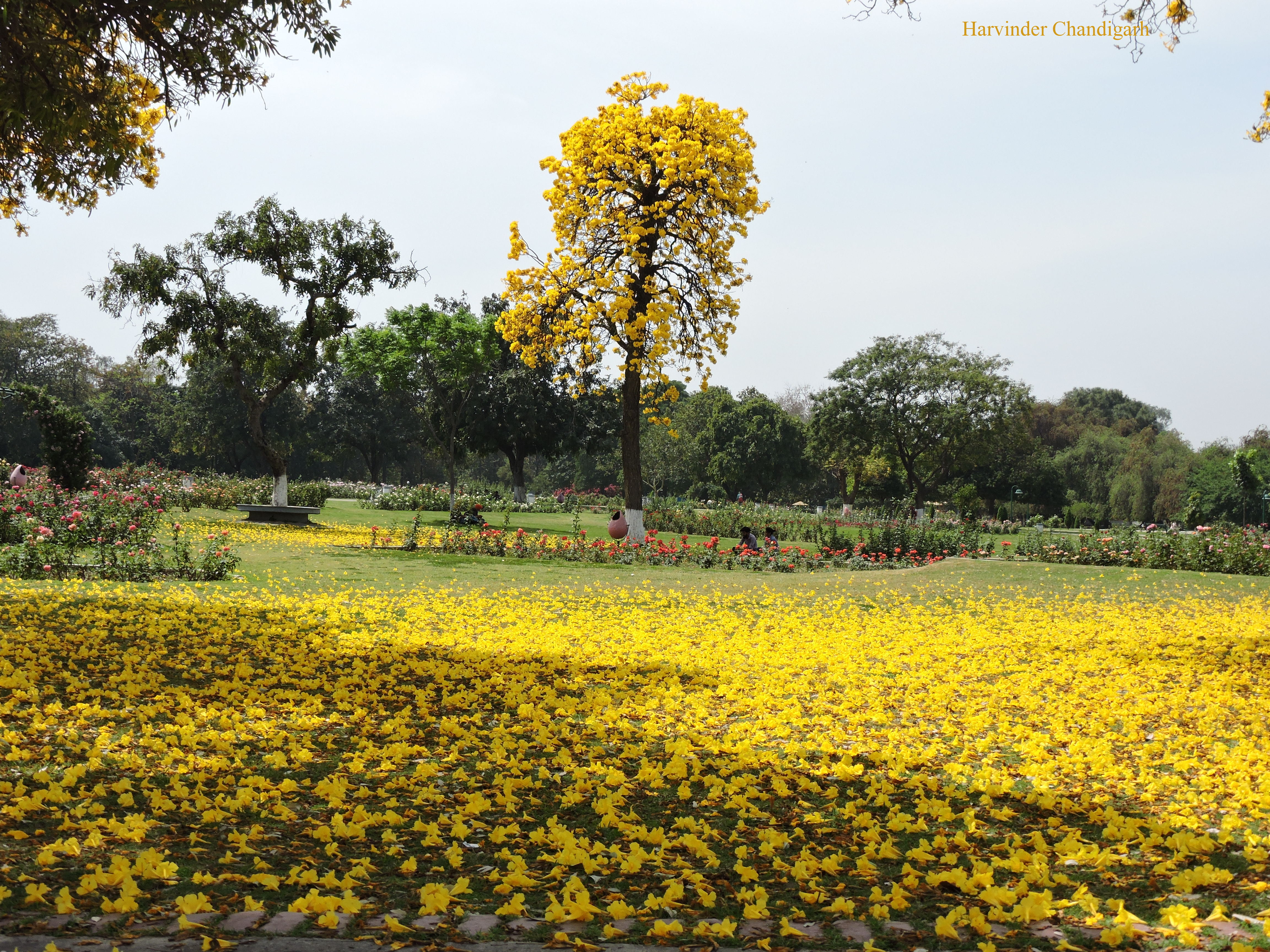
Roses in the garden.

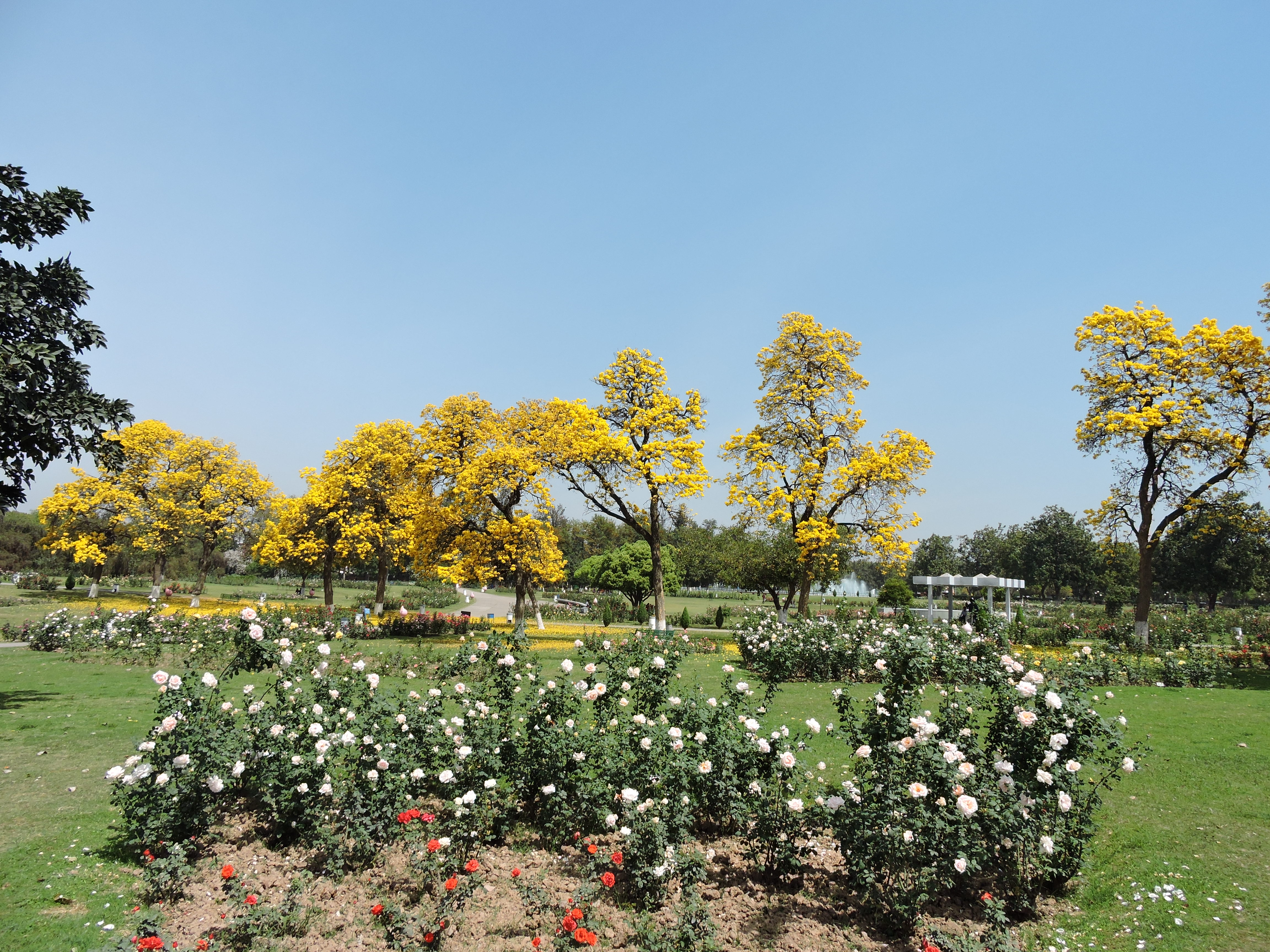
Roses in the garden.

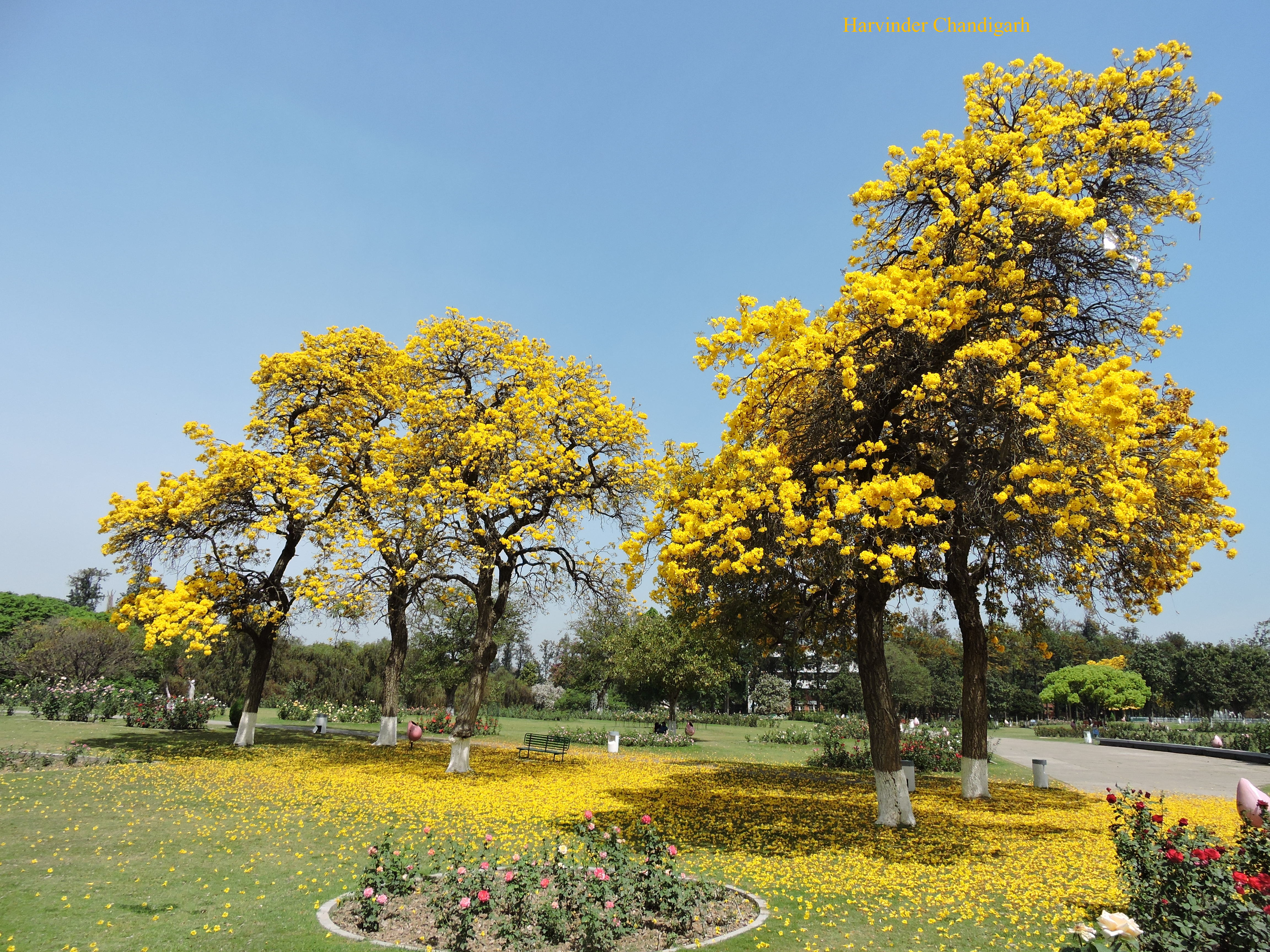
Roses in the garden.

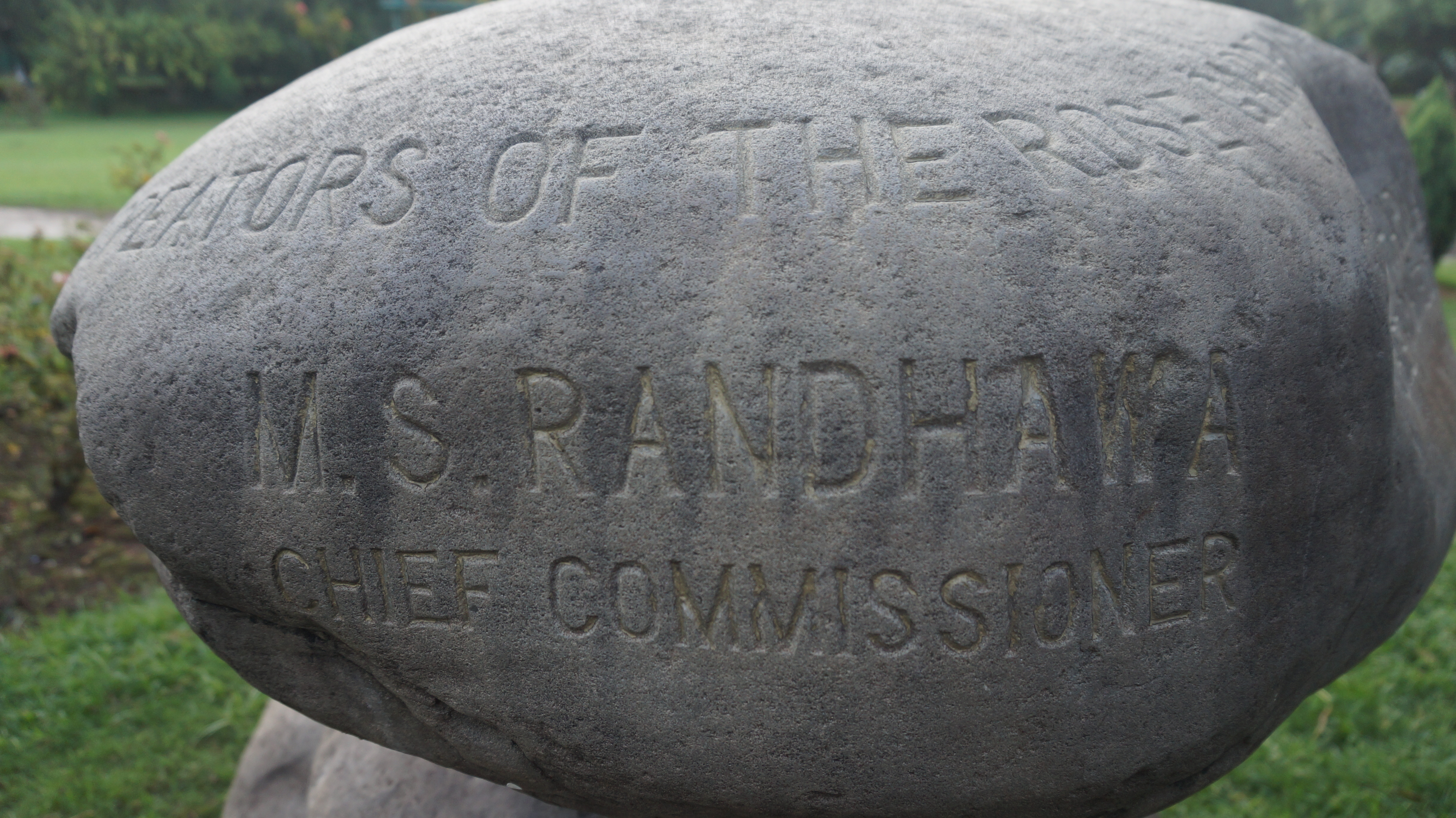
Tribute to the founder including Dr Randhawa

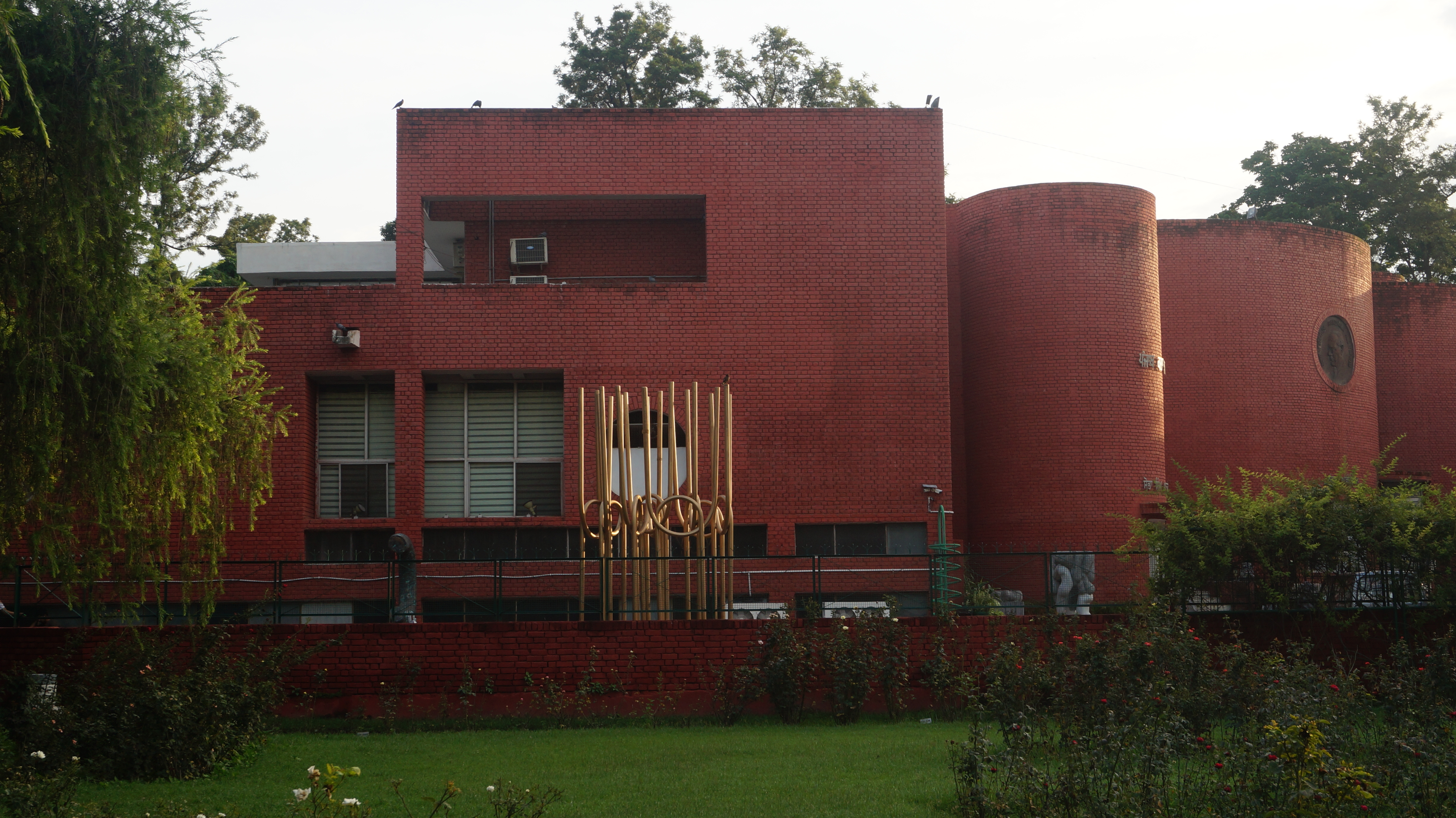
India rose garden modern art monument

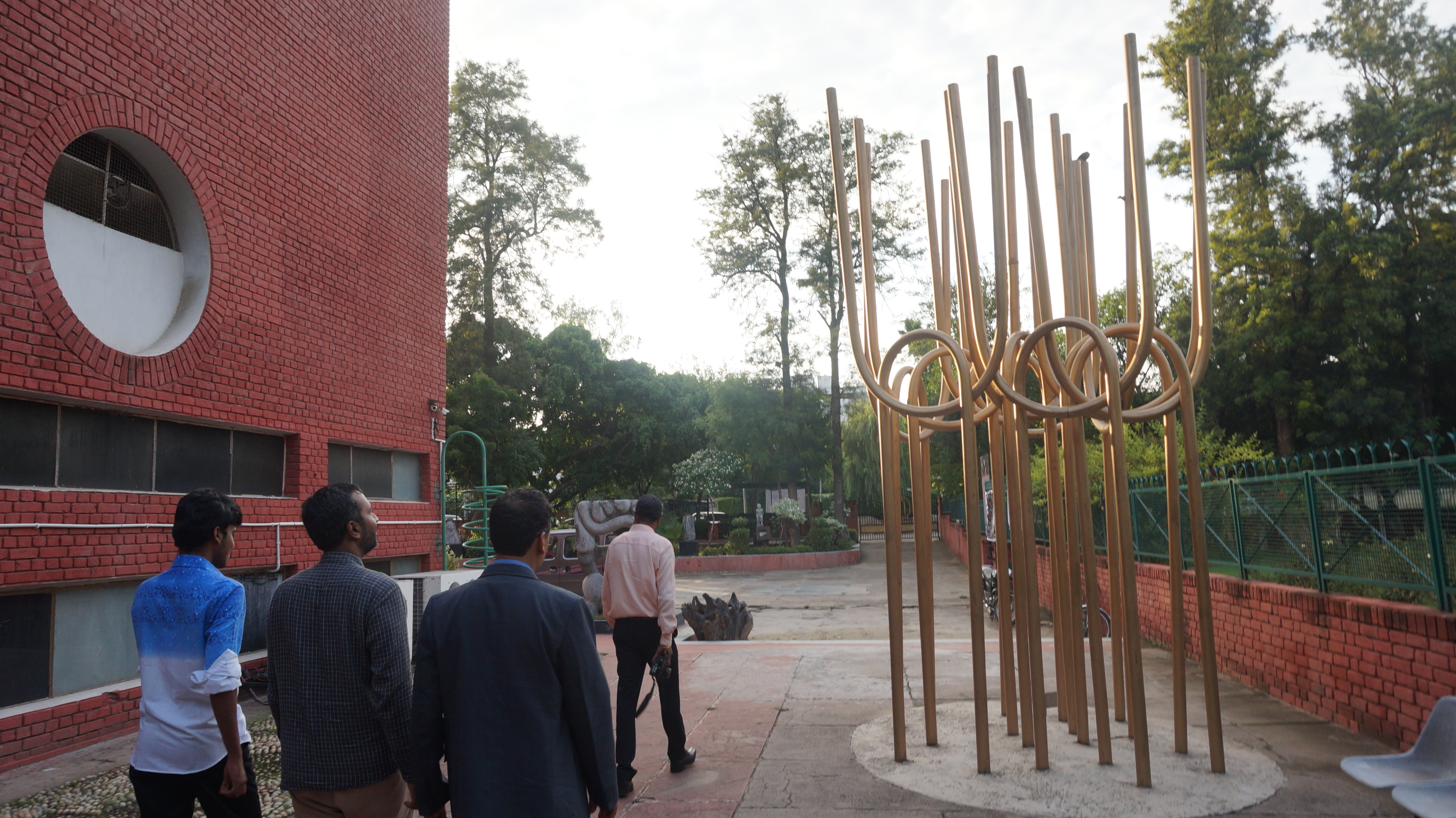
India rose garden modern art monument

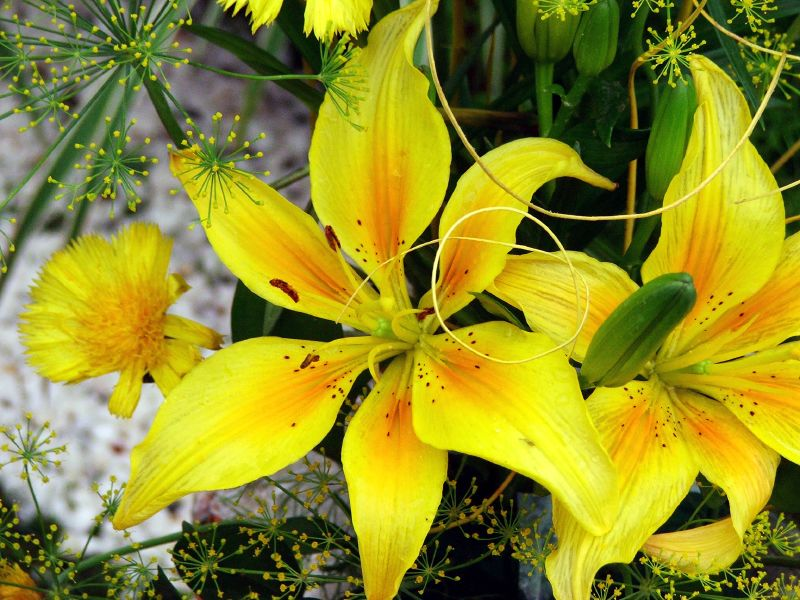
The winning flower from Rose Fest 2006

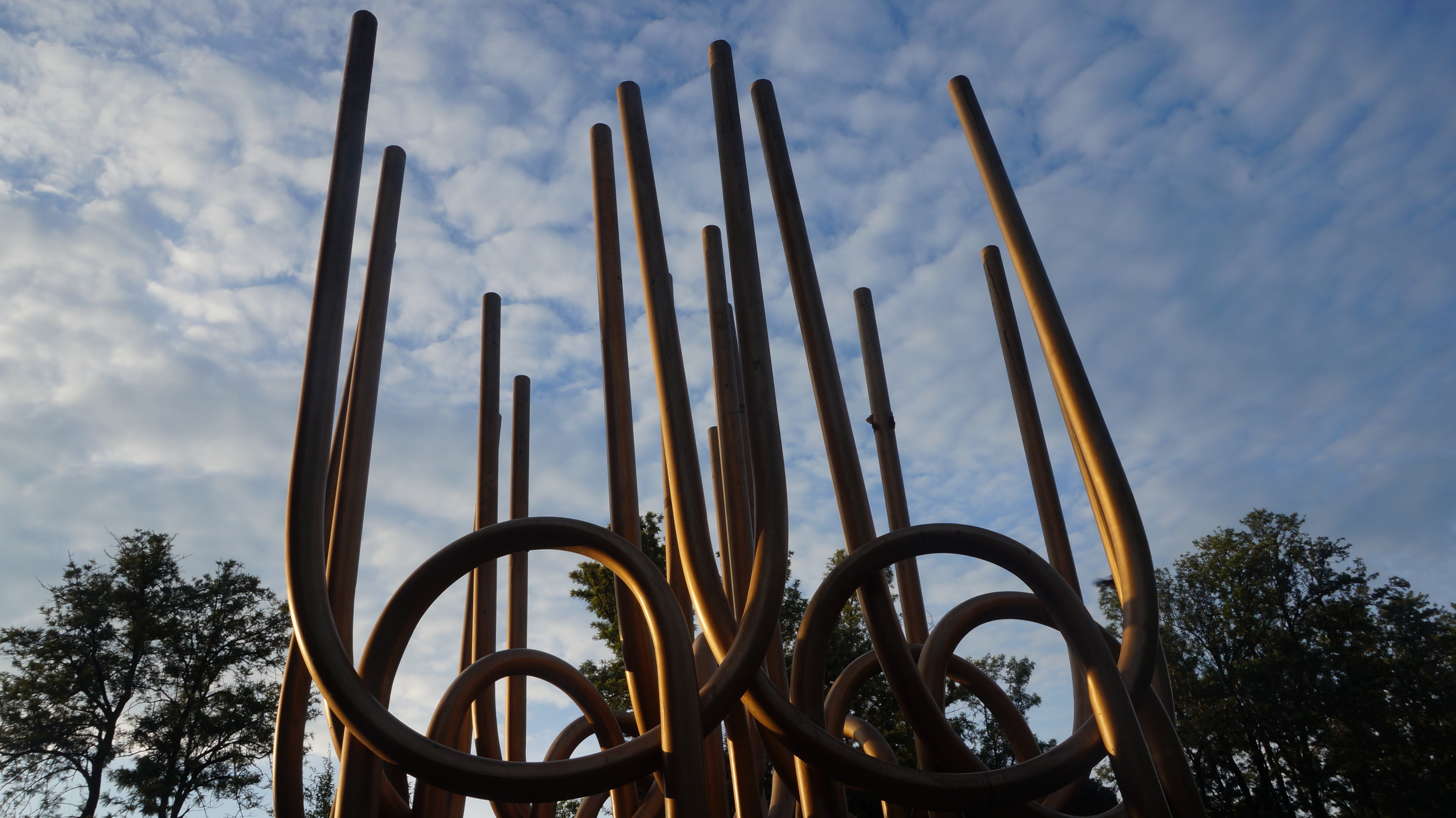
Modern art monument

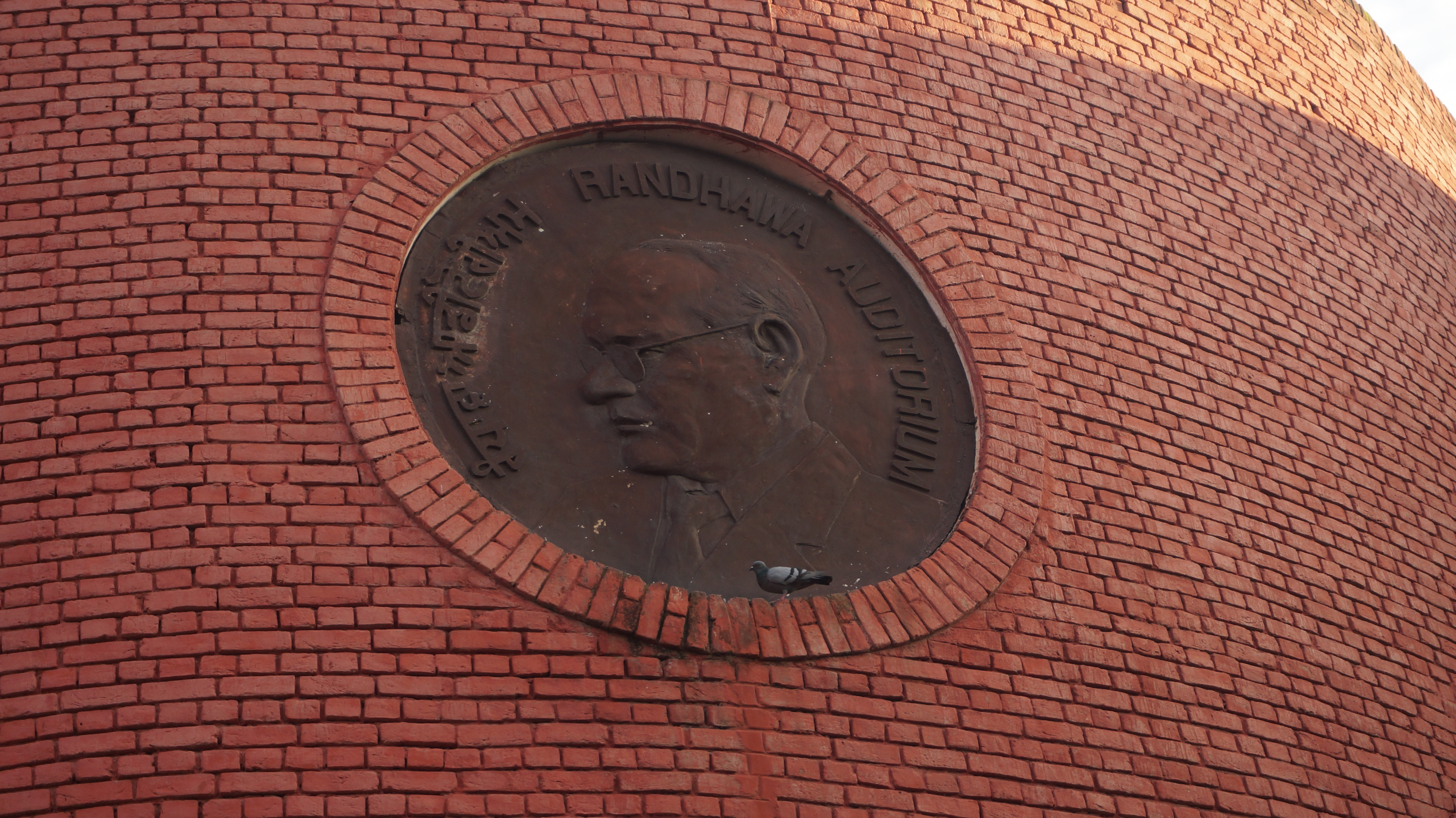
A plaque for Dr Randhawa

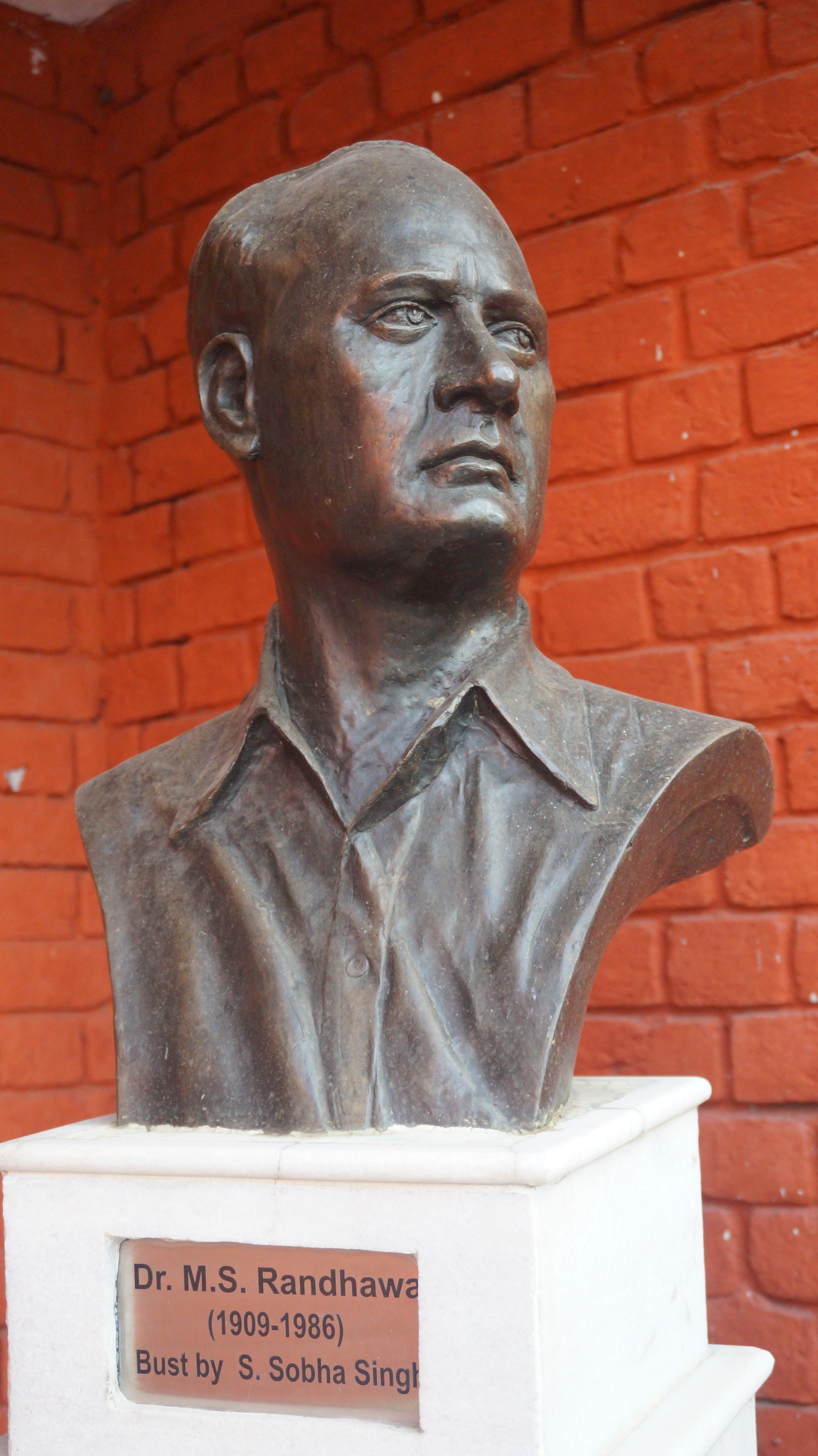
Bust of Dr Randhawa

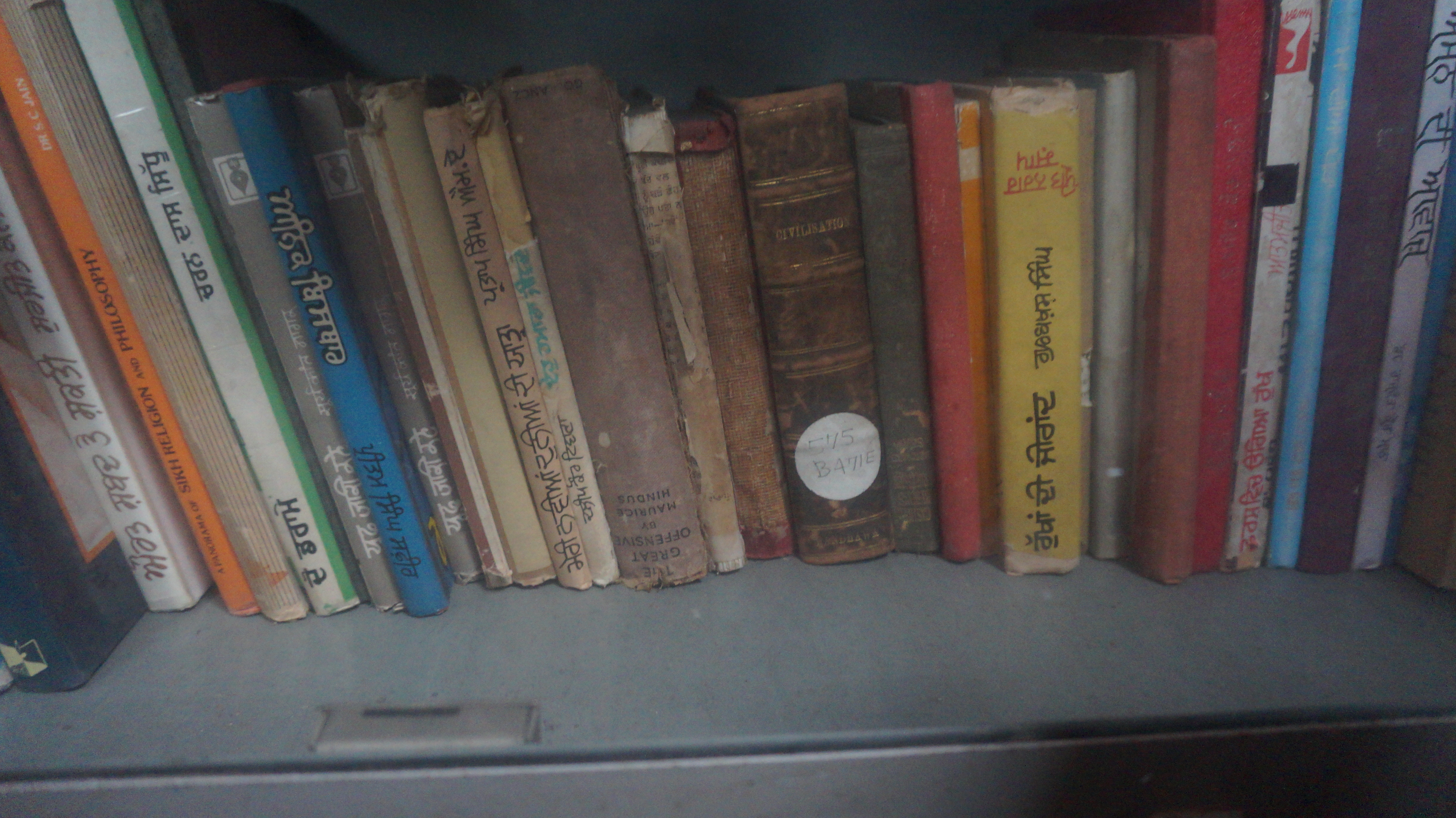
Books, probably belonging to Dr Randhawa, at the book cafe

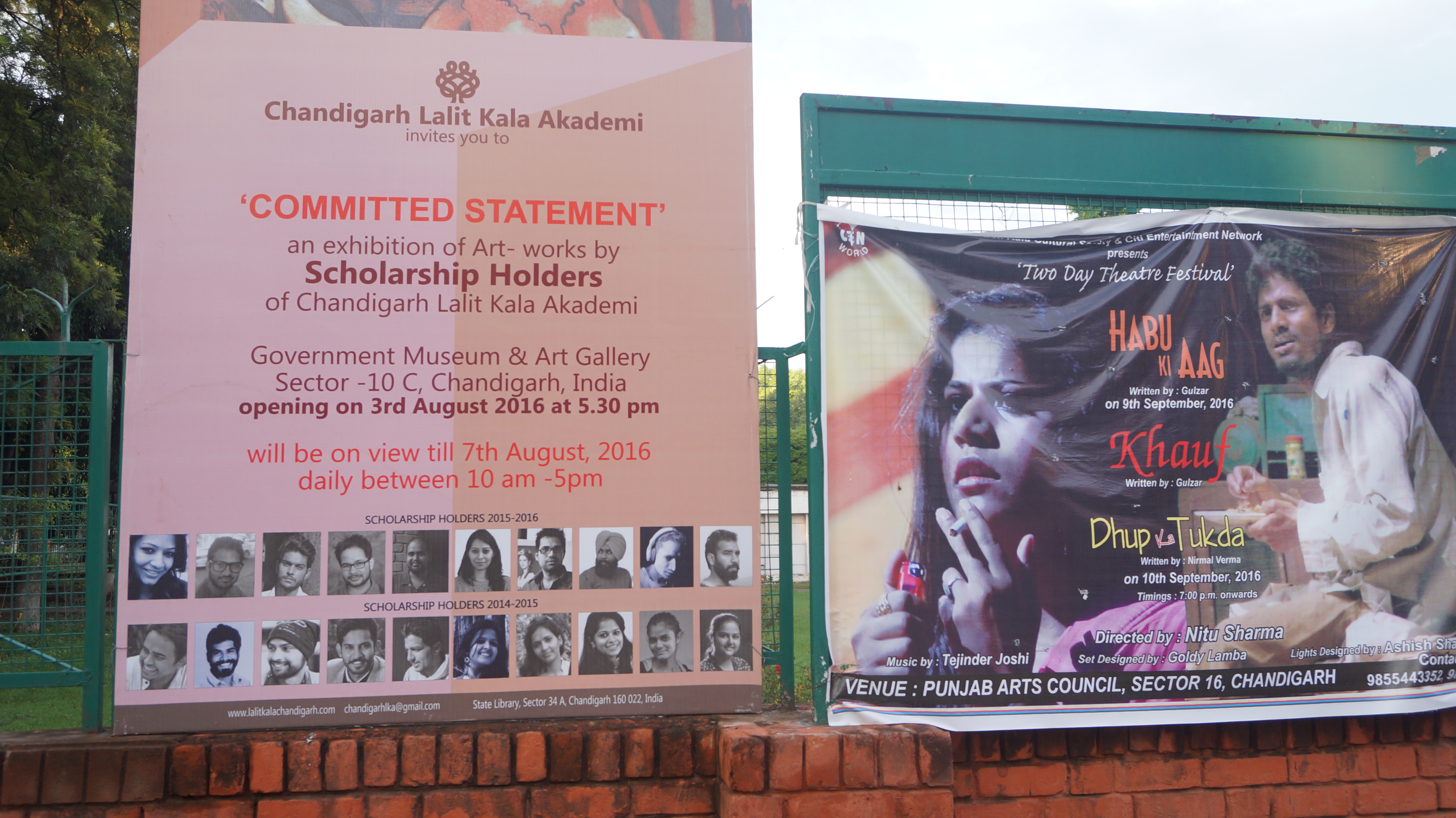
Banners at the rose garden

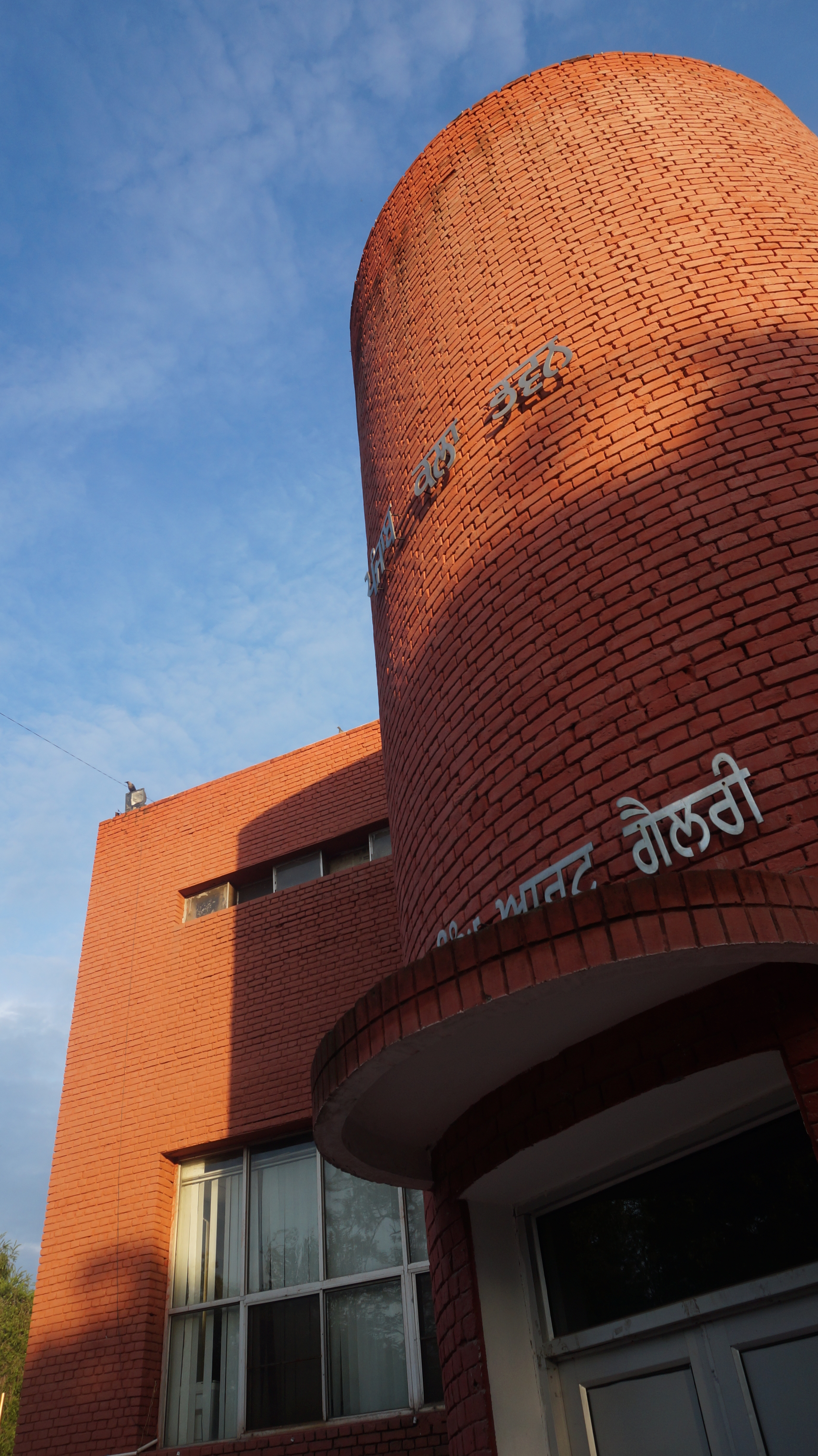
Auditorium at the rose garden
