= Zakir Hussain =

Zakir Hussain may refer to:

- Zakir Hussain (actor), Bollywood actor
- Zakir Hussain (field hockey) (1934–2019), Pakistani field hockey player
- Zakir Hussain (Haryana politician) (born 1962), Indian politician
- Zakir Hussain (Hyderabad cricketer) (born 1964), Indian cricketer
- Zakir Hussain (musician) (1951–2024), Indian classical tabla player
- Zakir Hussain (Pakistani cricketer), Pakistani cricketer who played for Pakistan Air Force
- Zakir Hussain, one of the perpetrators of the 1993 Bombay bombings

== See also ==
- Zakir Hasan (disambiguation)
- Zakir Husain (1897–1969), 3rd President of India
- Zakir Husain (governor) (1898–1971), governor of East Pakistan
- Zakir Hossain (disambiguation)
