= Zakir Hasan =

Zakir Hasan can refer to:

- Zakir Hasan (cricketer, born 1972), a Bangladeshi cricketer
- Zakir Hasan (cricketer, born 1998), a Bangladeshi cricketer

== See also ==
- Zakir Hussain (disambiguation)
