= Rose Festival (Chandigarh) =

Indian floral festival

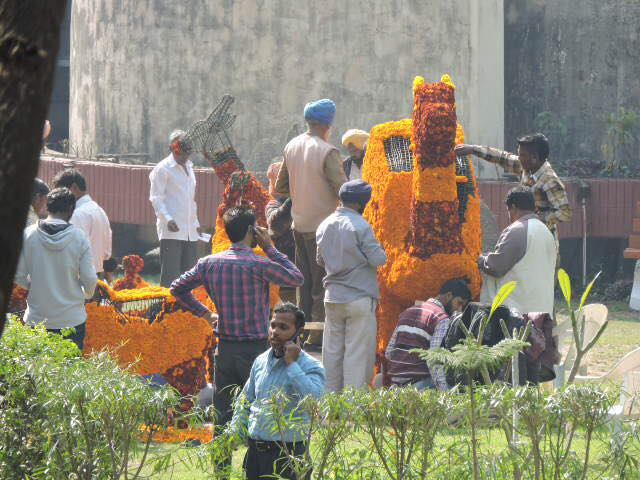

The Rose Festival of Chandigarh is a floral festival held every year in February in the Zakir Hussain Rose Garden of sector 16, Chandigarh, India. The 2018 festival was held from 23 February 2018 to 25 February 2018, and featured musical events, helicopter rides, and a dog show. The 2018 festival also had for the first time a stall to promote transgender awareness.

The garden where the festival is held hosts about 50,000 plants of 1,600 species of rose.

- Zakir Hussain Rose Garden of Chandigarh (combined capital of Punjab & Haryana states) has an underpass connectivity route with sector 17. which is opened on January 8. Punjab governor and UT administrator V P Singh Badnore will inaugurate the Rs 9 crore project having a 100-seat amphitheatre, cycle and golf cart ramps and dedicated walls for artworks, paintings and sculptures to enrich the cultural heritage of the city.
