= Zakir Hossain =

Zakir Hossain may refer to:

- Zakir Hossain (cricketer), Bangladeshi ODI cricketer
- Zakir Hossain (politician), a Bangladesh Awami League politician
- Jakir Hossain Raju, a Bangladeshi film director
- Zakir Hossain Raju, a professor,film critic, documentarian
- Zakir Hossain (footballer), Bangladeshi footballer
- Md Zakir Hossain, Bangladeshi politician

== See also ==
- Zakir Hussain (disambiguation)
