= Rehana Khatoon =

Persian Scholar

- Born: 30 August 1948 (age 77); Aligarh, Uttar Pradesh, India
- Occupations: Indian teacher and writer
- Years active: (1975-present)
- Spouse: Mashkoor Ur Rahman Ghyasi (m. 1969)
- Children: Bilal Rehman, Sabina Grand Children: Taha Rehman, Taseen Rehman, Rida Athar, Myiehsa Athar
- Parent: Nazir Ahmed (scholar)
- Awards: Padma Shri

Rehana Khatoon (born 30 August 1948) is an Indian scholar, teacher of Persian language, former Head of the Department of Persian, University of Delhi and the author of Encyclopaedia of Persian Language and Literature (India and Pakistan). She was honoured by the Government of India, in 2014, with the Padma Shri, the fourth highest civilian award, for her contributions to the propagation of Persian language and literature. Rehana Khatoon is the first woman alumni of the Aligarh Muslim University to be awarded the Padma Shri.

== Biography ==
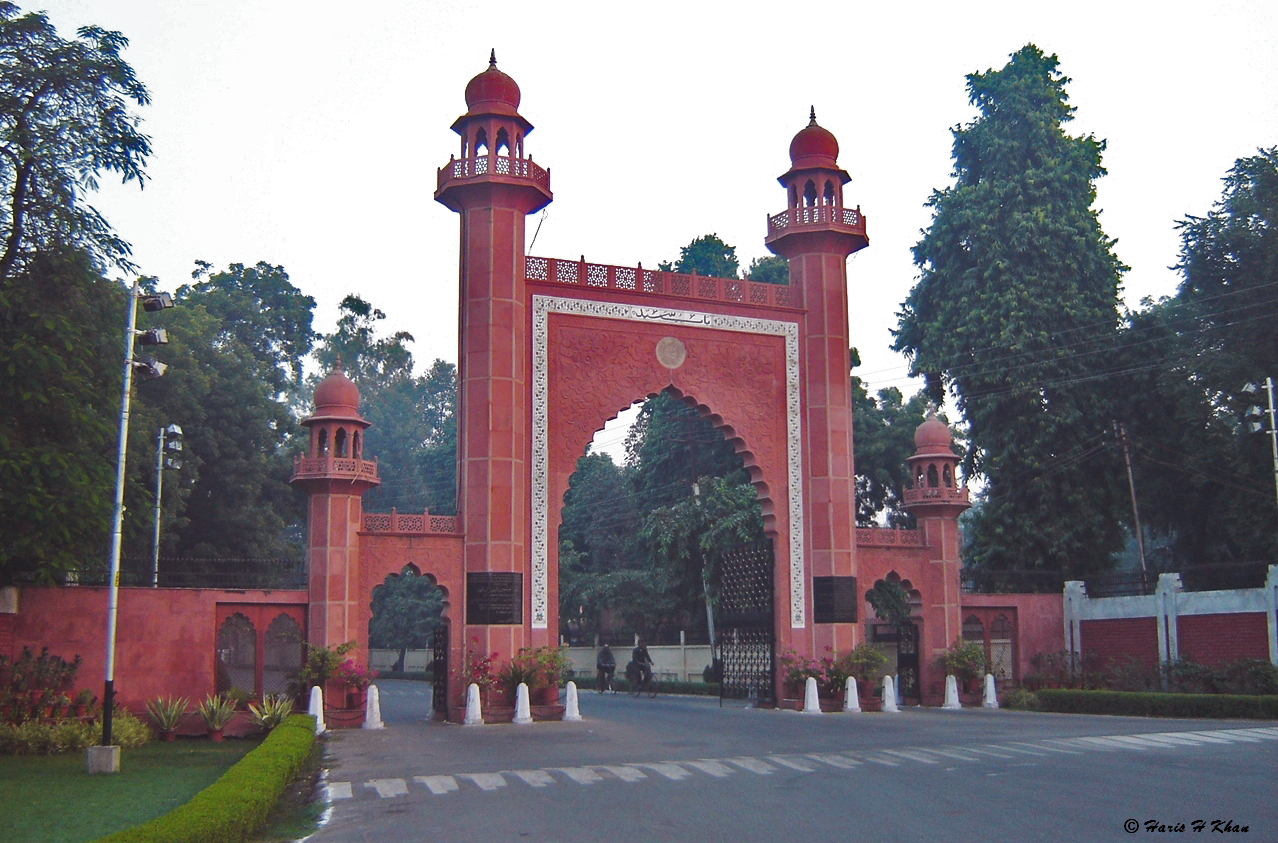
Aligarh Muslim University - Rehana Khatoon's alma mater

Prof Rehana Khatoon is undoubtedly the world’s foremost expert on Arzu, and I hope to work primarily with her on Indo-Persian Philosophy and the politics of vernacular culture, wrote Dr. Arthur Dudney, Columbia University, USA, an expert on Siraj-ud-Din Ali Khan Arzu, the famous poet-scholar.

God has given me a little courage and wisdom to serve Persian Literature a little. writes Rehana Khaloon

Rehana Khatoon was born on 30 August 1948, in Aligarh, in Uttar Pradesh, India to Late Professor Emeritus Nazir Ahmed, a renowned scholar of the Persian language and Padma Shri award winner. Inspired by her father, Rehana secured a master's degree in Persian in 1973 and followed it with an MPhil in 1975, and five yeares later, she took a doctoral degree in the language, in 1980, all from Aligarh Muslim University. Subsequently, she received a University Grants Commission fellowship and kickstarted her career as a research associate under the fellowship. In 1980, she joined University of Delhi as a faculty member where she worked till her retirement as the Head of the Department of Persian Language. During her tenure, she also worked as the Director of the Intensive Course in Modern Persian for Italian Students at the university and contributed to the Memorandum of Understanding between University of Delhi and University of Rome La Sapienza.

Rehana Khatoon kept herself abreast with the developments in the Persian language by regularly attending refresher courses. She attended a two-month-long course organized by Bunyad-i-Farhang-i-Iran, Tehran, in 1978 and a four-month course by University of Isfahan, Iran, in 1995. She attended the course conducted by the Academic Staff College, Jamia Millia Islamia and has attended 18 courses by the Iran Cultural Centre, New Delhi during the period from 1986 to 2006.

Rehana Khatoon currently lives in Noida with her family.

== Positions ==
Apart from working as the Head of the Department of Persian Language, University of Delhi, Rehana Khatoon has served as the Deputy Coordicator of the DRS Programme of the University Grants Commission and as a Member, Library Sub Committee - Ghalib Institute - 2014 She has also been the Vice President of the Scholar Association, New Delhi and was the Visiting Fellow at Aligarh Muslim University in 2007 and 2008. She has also served as the member of organizations of forums such as Ghalib Institute, Amir Khusro Society, Encyclopedia of Persian of the Subcontinent and Anjuman Tarriqi Urdu.

== Awards and recognitions ==
Rehana Khatoon was awarded the Padma Shri, in 2014, twenty seven years after her father, the 1987 Padma Shri award winner, Professor Nazir Ahmed was honoured by the Government of India. She has also received many other awards such as:

- Maulana Mohammad Ali Jauhar Award - Maulana Muhammad Ali Jauhar Academy - 2012
- Sir Syed Award - 2011
- Al Beruni Award - Government of Islamic Republic of Iran - 2011
- Presidential Award of Certificate of Honour by the President of India - 2009
- Fakhruddin Ali Ahmad Ghalib Award - Ghalib Institute, New Delhi - 2002
- Career Award - University Grants Commission, New Delhi - 1994-1997
- Fellowship - University of Isfahan, Teheran
- Research Scientist "A" - University Grants Commission, New Delhi - 1988
- Post-Doctoral Fellowship - University Grant Commission, New Delhi - 1980
- Senior Research Fellowship - University Grant Commission, New Delhi - 1977
- Ghalib Medal - 1969

== Publications ==
Rehana Khatoon is credited with several books, over 30 in number, on topics such as lexicography, comparative philology and Persian language and literature. She has also written a source book by name, Delhi: Past and Present: Focus on Persian Sources Some of her notable works are:

- Rehana Khatoon (1989). Ahwal-o-Asar-i-Siraj-ud-Din Ali Khan-i-Arzu (in Urdu). Delhi.
- Rehana Khatoon (1991). Muthmir (in Persian). Pakistan: University of Karachi.
- Rehana Khatoon (1991). Afazil-i-Khujand (in Urdu). Delhi.
- Rehana Khatoon (1995). Karnama-i-Nazir (in Urdu). Delhi.
- Rehana Khatoon (2001). Irani ke man Deedam (in Persian). Delhi.
- Rehana Khatoon (2001). Majalla-i-Tahqeeqat-i-Farsi (in Persian). Delhi.
- Rehana Khatoon (2003). Lughat-i-Shahjahani - Persian Urdu dictionary with Hindi pronunciation (in Persian and Urdu). Delhi.
- Rehana Khatoon. Sirajul Laughat-i-Khan-i-Arzu-3 volumes (in Persian). Teheran: Anjuman-i-Athar wa Mafakhir-i- Frahangi.
- Rehana Khatoon (2008). Essays on Mirza Hargopal Tafta (in Urdu). Delhi: Ghalib Institute.
- Rehana Khatoon (2010). Shaikh-ut-Taefe (in Urdu). Delhi.
- Rehana Khatoon (2010). Shree Raghunathji Mandir, Gulab Garh, Jammu (in Urdu). Delhi.
- Rehana Khatoon (2012). Majmu'a-e-Maqalat-e-Farsi (in Persian). Delhi: Iran culture House.
- Rehana Khatoon (2013). Persian Literature in India. Delhi.

Books apart, Khatoon is credited with several published articles on topics related to the Persian language. She has also translated a medical book on Diabetes, written by Dr. C. L. Arya and a story book, Mitti Se Heera by Professor Maqbool of Jamia Millia Islamia, from Hindi to Urdu.

== See also ==
- Siraj-ud-Din Ali Khan Arzu
