= 1962 Indian presidential election =

Election of Sarvepalli Radhakrishnan

- 7 May 1962
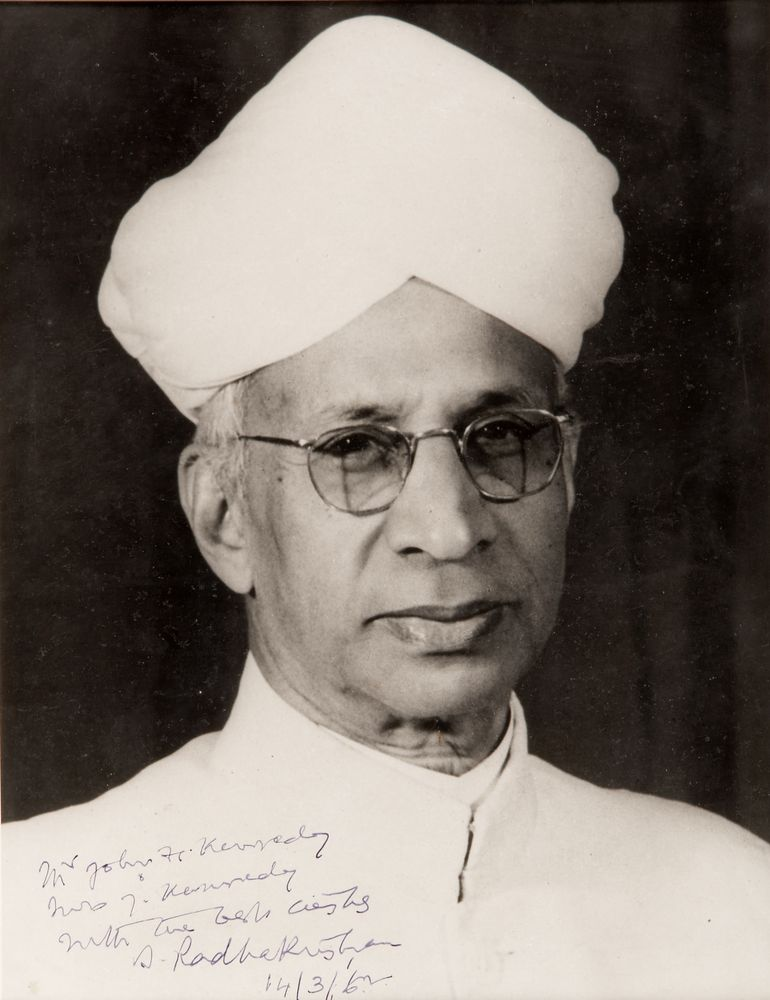

Nominee	Sarvepalli Radhakrishnan	Chaudhary Hari Ram
Party	Independent	Independent
Home state	Andhra Pradesh	Punjab
Electoral vote	553,067	6,341
Percentage	98.25%	1.13%
President before election
Rajendra Prasad
INC
Elected President
Sarvepalli Radhakrishnan
Independent

The Election Commission of India held indirect third presidential elections of India on 7 May 1962. Dr. Sarvepalli Radhakrishnan with 553,067 votes won the presidency over his rivals Chowdhry Hari Ram who got 6,341 votes and Yamuna Prasad Trisulia who got 3,537 votes.

== Schedule ==
The election schedule was announced by the Election Commission of India on 6 April 1962.

S.No.	Poll Event	Date
1.	Last Date for filing nomination	16 April 1962
2.	Date for Scrutiny of nomination	18 April 1962
3.	Last Date for Withdrawal of nomination	21 April 1962
4.	Date of Poll	7 May 1962
5.	Date of Counting	11 May 1962

== Results ==
Source: Web archive of Election Commission of India website

Candidate	Electoral Values
Sarvepalli Radhakrishnan	553,067
Chaudhary Hari Ram	6,341
Yamuna Prasad Trisulia	3,537
Total	562,945

== See also ==
- 1962 Indian vice presidential election
