= N. C. Samantsinhar =

Indian politician (1912–1982)

Member of Lok Sabha
- Constituency: Bhubaneswar

Personal details
- Born: 2 March 1912 Puri district, Bengal Presidency, British India (in present-day Odisha, India)
- Died: 18 October 1982 (aged 70) Odisha, India
- Party: Indian National Congress
- Children: 2
- Occupation: Politician

N. C. Samantsinhar (2 March 1912 – 18 October 1982) was an Indian politician who served as a member of the 2nd Lok Sabha from Bhubaneswar Lok Sabha constituency representing the Indian National Congress and a runner-up for the 1962 Indian vice presidential election securing only 14 votes.

== Personal life ==
Samantsinhar was born on 2 March 1912 in Puri district (then in Bengal Presidency in British India) to Maheshwar Samantsinhar. He was married to Manorama and had two sons. He resided in South Avenue, New Delhi.

Samantsinhar died in Odisha on 18 October 1982, at the age of 70.
