= Yusuf Husain =

Indian historian (1902–1979)

Yusuf Husain Khan (1902–1979) was an Indian historian, scholar, educationist, critic and author. He mastered the languages of Arabic, English, French, Urdu, Hindi and Persian.

== Early life and education ==
Born in Hyderabad, India to a cultured and educated family, he was a younger brother of Zakir Husain, the third president of India (1967–1969). He went to school in Etawah. In 1926, he gained his BA from Jamia Millia Islamia, Delhi and in 1930 he gained his D Litt from the University of Paris, France.

== Career ==
After returning from Paris in 1930, he assisted Abdul Haq to compile an English-Urdu dictionary and translate scientific terminology into Urdu.

He joined Osmania University in 1930 as a lecturer and worked there until 1957, when he retired as a professor. He joined Aligarh Muslim University as a Pro-Vice Chancellor and worked there until 1965.

== Books ==
- Tarikh-e-Hind (Ahd e halia). History of India and East India Company until 1939.
- Tarikh–e–Deccan (Ahd e halia). History of Deccan.
- Mudabadi e umraniat (translation from French)
- Rooh e Iqbal
- Urdu Gazal
- Hasrat ki shairi
- Fransisi adab (an analysis of French literature and language )
- Ghalib aur ahang e Ghalib (1971)
- Urdu gazals of Ghalib (1975)
- Persian ghazals of Ghalib (1976)
- Hafiz aur Iqbal (1976),

=== English books ===
- The first Nizām; the life and times of Nizāmu'l-Mulk Āsaf Jāh I (1963)

== Awards ==
The Government of India awarded Khan the Padma Bhushan, the third highest civilian award, in 1977. He received the Sahitya Academy Award in 1978 for his book, Hafiz aur Iqbal, which was published in 1976.
