= List of vice presidents of India =

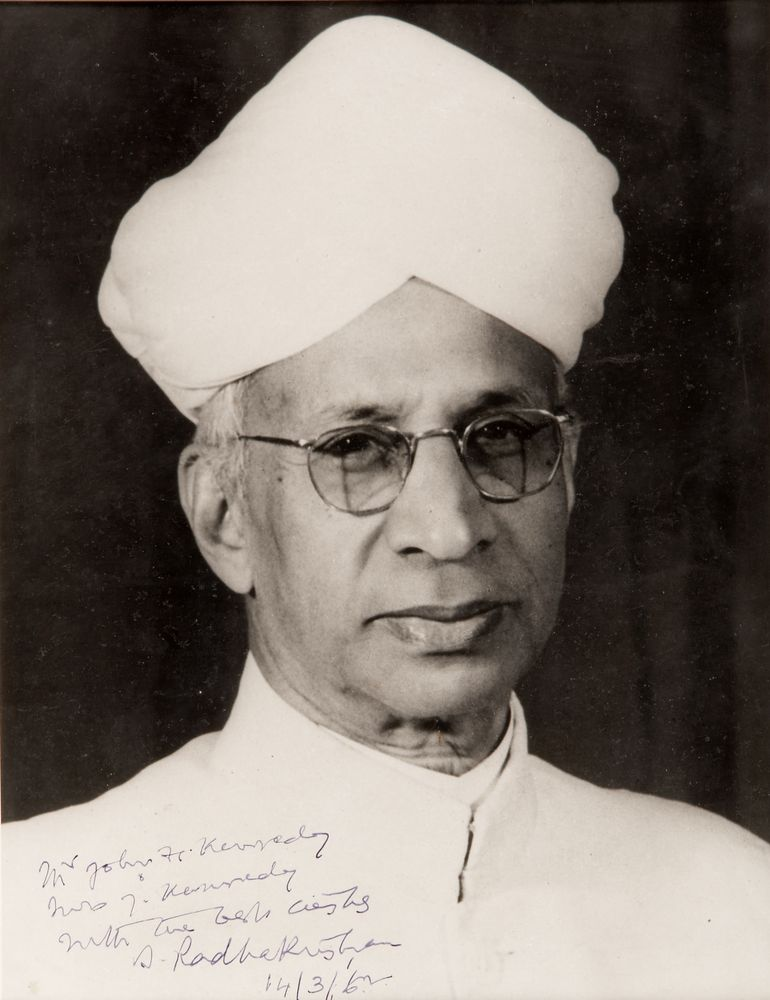
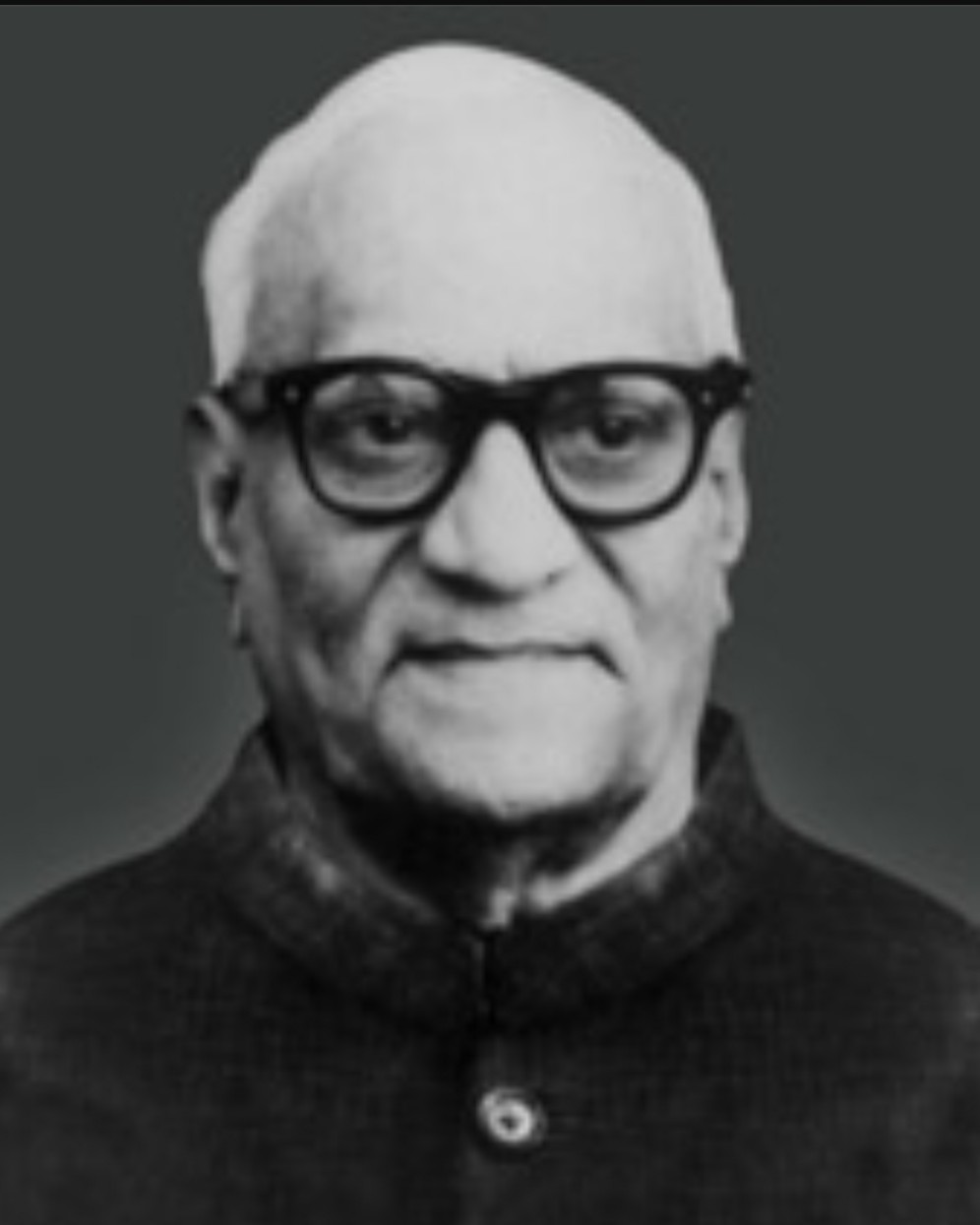
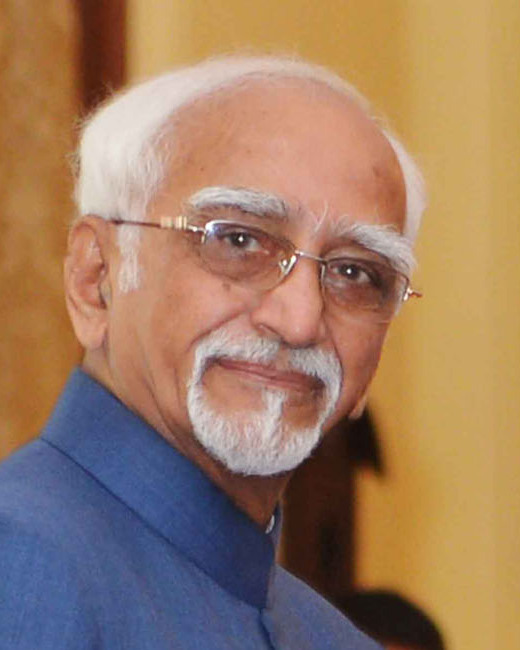
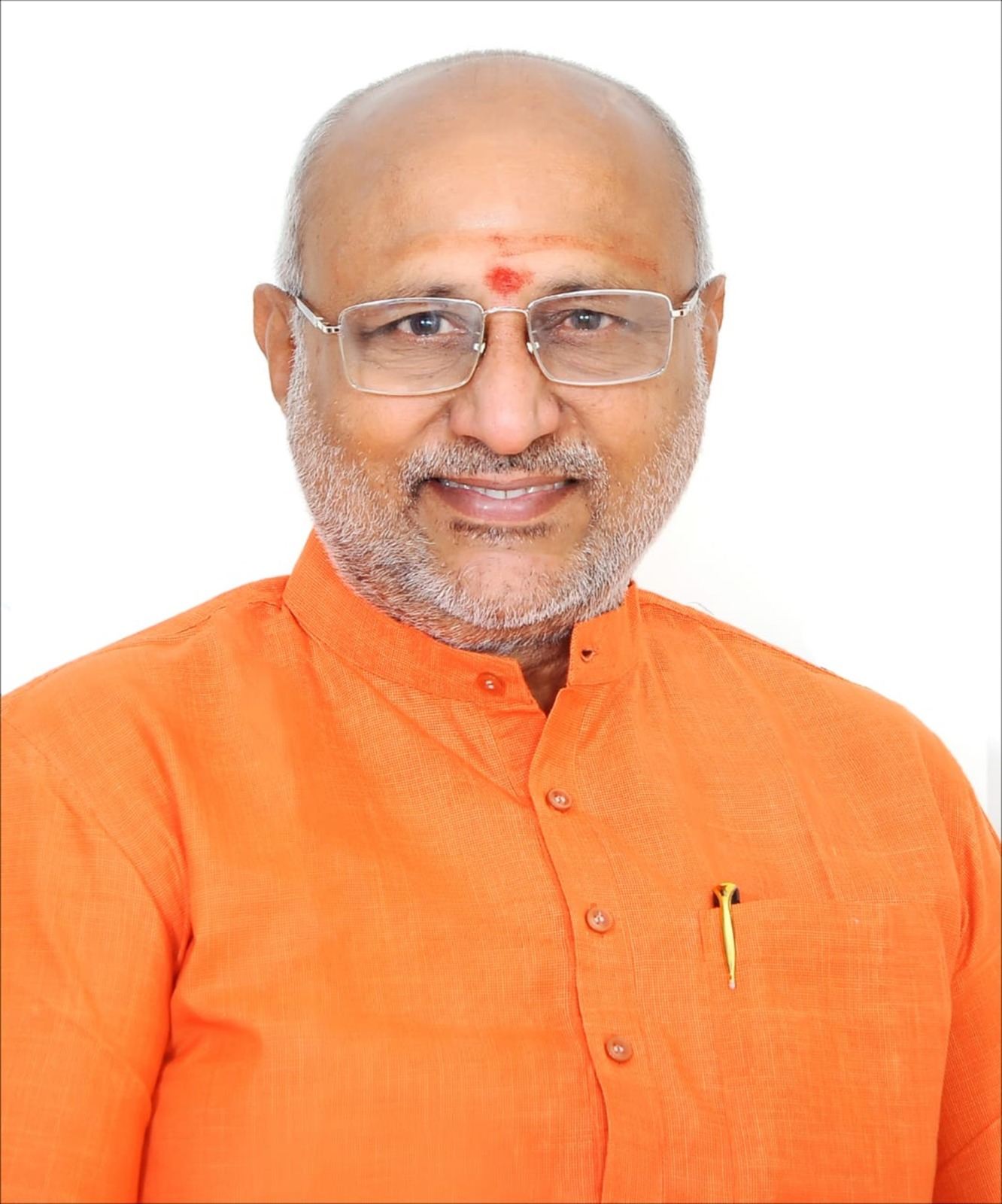
- Top left: Sarvepalli Radhakrishnan was the first and longest-serving vice president of India.
- Top right: V. V. Giri was the first vice president to serve as acting president upon the demise of the president.
- Bottom left: Mohammad Hamid Ansari was the second-longest-serving vice president and the only vice president to serve under three presidents.
- Bottom right: C. P. Radhakrishnan is the current vice president.

The vice president of India is the second highest constitutional office in the government of India after the president. In accordance with Article 63 of the Constitution of India, the vice president discharges the functions of the president when a contingency arises due to the resignation, removal, death, impeachment or the inability of the president to discharge their functions. They are also the ex officio chairperson of the Rajya Sabha, the upper house of the Parliament of India.

The vice president is elected by an electoral college consisting of all members of both houses of the Parliament in accordance with the system of proportional representation by means of the single transferable vote via a secret ballot conducted by the Election Commission of India. Once elected the vice president continues in office for a five-year term, but can continue in office irrespective of the expiry of the term, until a successor assumes office. They can be removed by a resolution passed by an effective majority in the Rajya Sabha. They are responsible for the protection of the rights and privileges of the members of the Council of States. They also decide whether a bill introduced in the Rajya Sabha is a financial bill. There have been 15 vice presidents since the inception of the post in 1950. The first vice president of India, Sarvepalli Radhakrishnan, took oath at Rashtrapati Bhavan on 13 May 1952. He later served as the president. Following the death of Zakir Husain in 1969, Varahagiri Venkata Giri resigned from the post of vice president to contest the presidential election and got elected. Out of 15 vice presidents, six of them later went on to become the president. Krishan Kant has been the only one to die during his tenure. Venkaiah Naidu is the first vice president to be born after Indian Independence.

== List of vice presidents ==
This list is numbered based on vice presidents elected after winning an Indian vice presidential election. The vice president of India does not represent any political party. The colors used in the table indicate the related party from which they originally came.

#	Portrait	Name (born–died)	Term of office			Election	President	Party
1.		Sarvepalli Radhakrishnan (1888–1975)	13 May 1952	13 May 1957	10 years	1952 (Unopposed)	Rajendra Prasad	Independent
1.		Sarvepalli Radhakrishnan (1888–1975)	13 May 1957	13 May 1962	10 years	1957 (Unopposed)	Rajendra Prasad	Independent
2.		Zakir Husain (1897–1969)	13 May 1962	13 May 1967	5 years	1962 (95.3%)	Sarvepalli Radhakrishnan	Independent
3.		V. V. Giri (1894–1980)	13 May 1967	3 May 1969^{[RES]} (Note: Resigned after being elected as the President of India.)	1 year, 355 days	1967 (71.45%)	Zakir Husain	Independent
Position Vacant (3 May 1969 – 31 August 1969) – 120 days,
4.		Gopal Swarup Pathak (1896–1982)	31 August 1969	31 August 1974	5 years	1969 (52.7%)	Varahagiri Venkata Giri Fakhruddin Ali Ahmed	Independent
5.		B. D. Jatti (1912–2002)	31 August 1974	31 August 1979	5 years	1974 (78.7%)	Fakhruddin Ali Ahmed Neelam Sanjiva Reddy	Indian National Congress (R)
6.		Mohammad Hidayatullah (1905–1992)	31 August 1979	31 August 1984	5 years	1979 (Unopposed)	Neelam Sanjiva Reddy Zail Singh	Independent
7.		Ramaswamy Venkataraman (1910–2009)	31 August 1984	24 July 1987^{[RES]}	2 years, 327 days	1984 (71.05%)	Zail Singh	Indian National Congress (I)
Position Vacant (24 July 1987 – 3 September 1987) – 41 days,
8.		Shankar Dayal Sharma (1912–1999)	3 September 1987	24 July 1992^{[RES]}	4 years, 325 days	1987 (Unopposed)	Ramaswamy Venkataraman	Indian National Congress (I)
Position Vacant (24 July 1992 – 21 August 1992) – 28 days,
9.		K. R. Narayanan (1920–2005)	21 August 1992	24 July 1997^{[RES]}	4 years, 337 days	1992 (99.86%)	Shankar Dayal Sharma	Indian National Congress (I)
Position Vacant (24 July 1997 – 21 August 1997) – 28 days,
10.		Krishan Kant (1927–2002)	21 August 1997	27 July 2002 (Note: Died in Office)	4 years, 340 days	1997 (61.76%)	K. R. Narayanan A. P. J. Abdul Kalam	Janata Dal
Position Vacant (27 July 2002 – 19 August 2002) – 23 days,
11.		Bhairon Singh Shekhawat (1925–2010)	19 August 2002	21 July 2007^{[RES]} (Note: Resigned to contest the 2007 Indian presidential election, but lost to Pratibha Patil.)	4 years, 336 days	2002 (59.82%)	A. P. J. Abdul Kalam	Bharatiya Janata Party
Position Vacant (21 July 2007 – 11 August 2007) – 21 days,
12.		Mohammad Hamid Ansari (born 1937)	11 August 2007	11 August 2012	10 years	2007 (60.5%)	Pratibha Patil Pranab Mukherjee	Indian National Congress
12.		Mohammad Hamid Ansari (born 1937)	11 August 2012	11 August 2017	10 years	2012 (67.31%)	Pranab Mukherjee	Indian National Congress
13.		Venkaiah Naidu (born 1949)	11 August 2017	11 August 2022	5 years	2017 (67.89%)	Ram Nath Kovind Droupadi Murmu	Bharatiya Janata Party
14.		Jagdeep Dhankhar (born 1951)	11 August 2022	21 July 2025^{[RES]} (Note: Resigned)	2 years, 344 days	2022 (74.37%)	Droupadi Murmu	Bharatiya Janata Party
Position Vacant (21 July 2025 – 12 September 2025) – 53 days,
15.		C. P. Radhakrishnan (born 1957)	12 September 2025	Incumbent	1 year, 53 days	2025 (60.1%)	Droupadi Murmu	Bharatiya Janata Party

== Statistics ==
Representation of vice presidents by party of candidacy
1. Independent (33.3%)
2. Indian National Congress (33.3%)
3. Bharatiya Janata Party (26.7%)
4. Janata Dal (6.67%)

Timeline

== See also ==
- President of India
- Vice President of India
- Prime Minister of India
- Union Council of Ministers
- Deputy Prime Minister of India
- List of presidents of India
- List of prime ministers of India
