= 2012 Indian presidential election =

Election of Pranab Mukherjee

- 19 July 2012
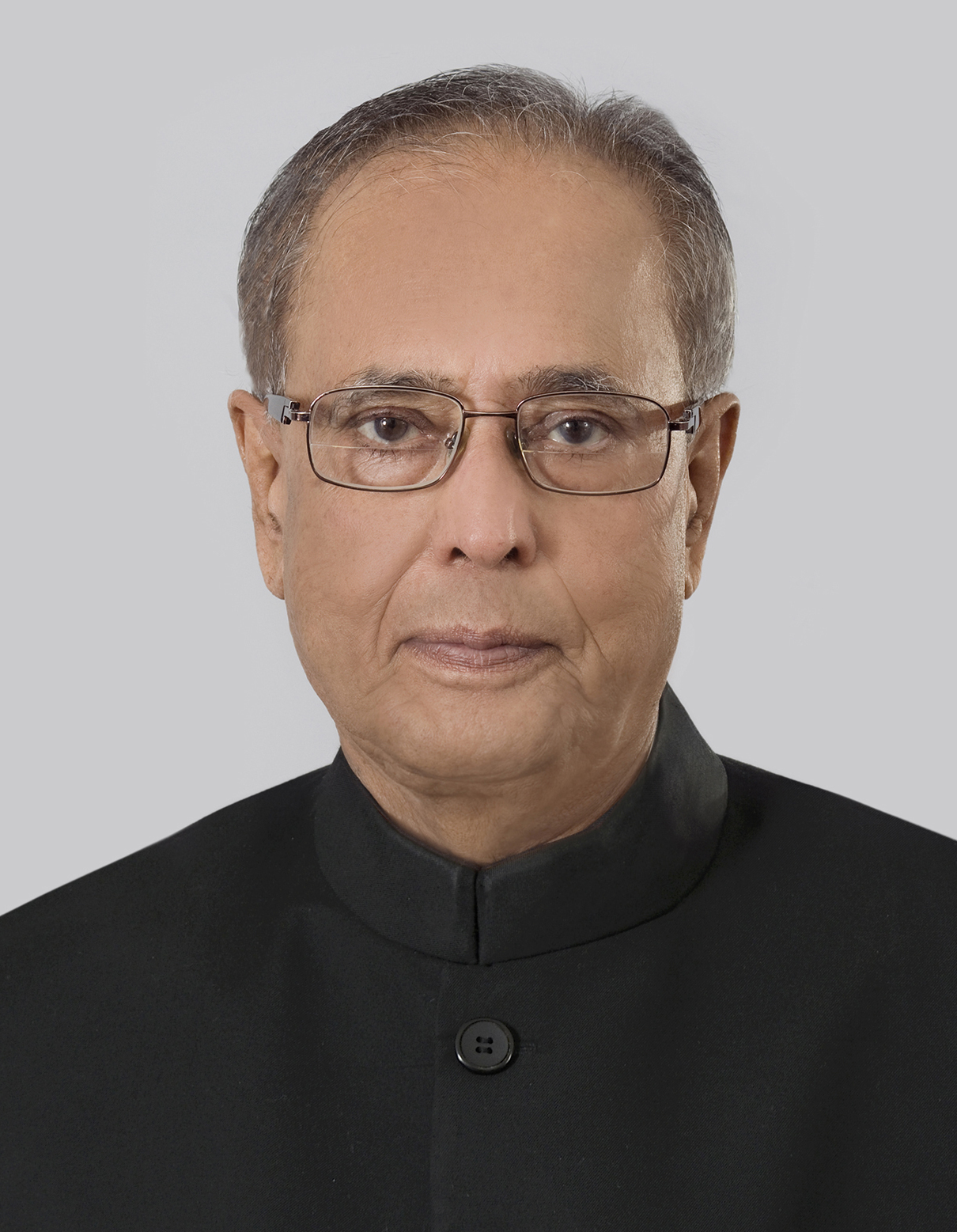

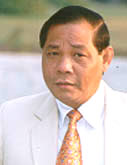
Nominee	Pranab Mukherjee	P. A. Sangma
Party	INC	NPP
Alliance	UPA	NDA
Home state	West Bengal	Meghalaya
Electoral vote	713,763	315,987
States carried	20+NCT+PY	8
Percentage	69.3%	30.7%
Swing	3.5% ▲	3.5% ▼
President before election
Pratibha Patil
INC
President after election
Pranab Mukherjee
INC

The 14th indirect presidential election, in order to elect the 13th President, was held in India on 19 July 2012. The last date for filing nominations was 30 June, whereas the votes would be counted on 22 July. The two leading candidates for the presidency were former Finance Minister Pranab Mukherjee from West Bengal and former Speaker of the Lok Sabha Purno Agitok Sangma from Meghalaya.

On 22 July, Mukherjee was declared the winner. He was sworn in on 25 July at 11:30.

== Selection process ==
The new president is chosen by an electoral college consisting of the elected members of both houses of parliament, the elected members of the state legislative assemblies and the elected members of the legislative assemblies of the Union Territories of Delhi and Puducherry.

The nomination of a candidate for election to the office of the President must be subscribed by at least 50 electors as proposers and 50 electors as seconders. The election is held in accordance with the system of proportional representation by means of the Single transferable vote method. The voting takes place by secret ballot. The manner of election of President is provided by Article 55 of the Constitution.

== Final Presidential Candidates ==
=== United Progressive Alliance ===
United Progressive Alliance
For President

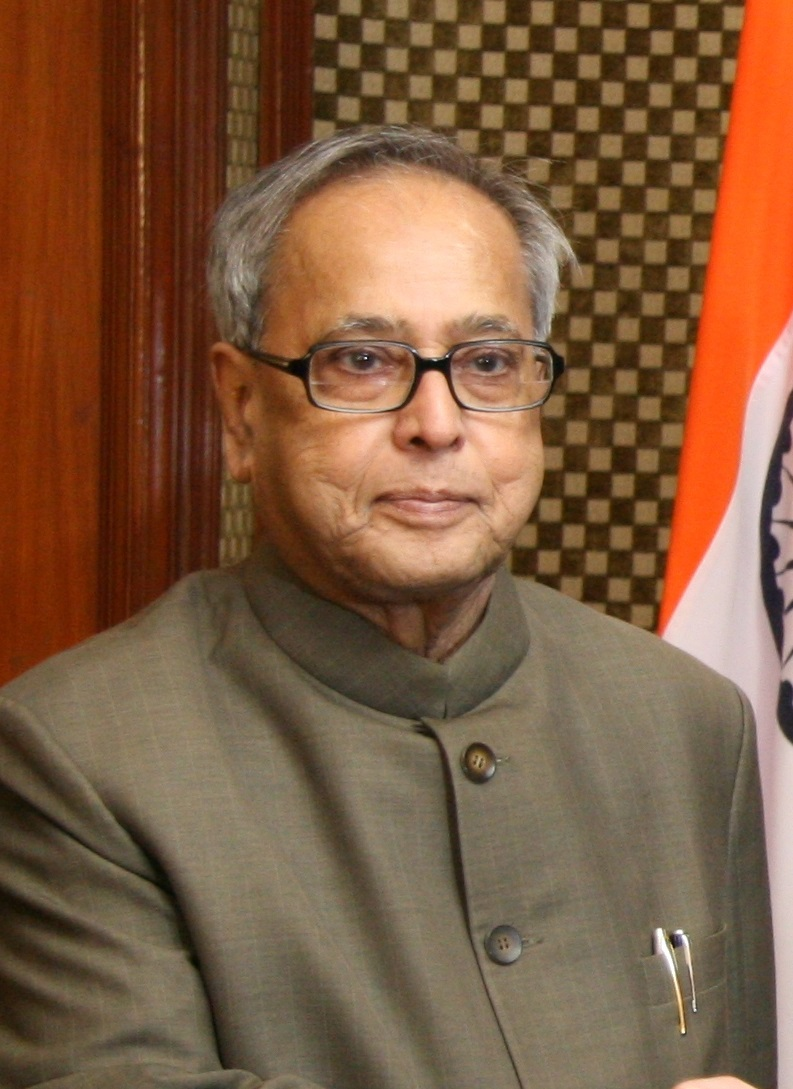

Pranab Mukherjee

Indian National Congress

=== National Democratic Alliance ===
National Democratic Alliance
For President

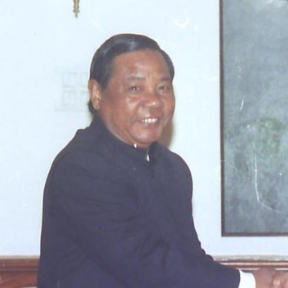

P. A. Sangma

National People's Party

=== Candidature Proposals ===
Various names had been speculated by the Indian media and politicians prior to the official candidacies being submitted. Opinion polls have shown that the public preferred former President A. P. J. Abdul Kalam to hold the post once again, which was supported by the Bharatiya Janata Party (BJP). On 15 June, the United Progressive Alliance (UPA) announced Pranab Mukherjee as its presidential candidate. There were signs of a split within the Janata Dal (United) with Bihar Chief Minister Nitish Kumar saying that "like the other constituents, the JD (U) too will abide by the final decision on the presidential poll," though Shivanand Tiwari said that "a senior and respected leader like Pranab Mukherjee, who is going into retire [from active politics] should be given a graceful send off." Tiwari added that "[Mukherjee] is a very senior and a respected leader, and my personal opinion is that as he should be elected to the president's post with consensus." The Shiv Sena supported Mukherjee's candidates according to its spokesman Sanjay Raut. On 18 June, Kalam said he would not run in the race following statement from JDU leader Nitish Kumar and SP leader Mulayam Singh Yadav that they would prefer to support Mukherjee. Following Kalam's decision, the BJP-led NDA turned to supporting Sangma.

=== Unofficial list ===
The final candidacy application had 45 names. Scrutiny of the candidates took place on 2 July Pranab Mukherjee filed his nomination on 28 June with the support of the INC's Manmohan Singh, party president Sonia Gandhi, General Secretary Rahul Gandhi, Samajwadi Party leader Mulayam Singh Yadav, the Rashtriya Janata Dal's leader Lalu Prasad Yadav, the Rashtriya Lok Dal's Ajit Singh, the Lok Janshakti Party's Ram Vilas Paswan, the National Conference's Farooq Abdullah, the Indian Union Muslim League's E. Ahamed and the Dravida Munnetra Kazhagam's T. R. Baalu. The Hindustan Times suggested that he also had the support of the National Democratic Alliance's Janata Dal (United) and the Shiv Sena, as well as the Communist Party of India (Marxist). Mukherjee said after filing his nomination papers that "I only wish at this time that we have the blessing of god and cooperation of all at this juncture." P. A. Sangma filed his nomination papers with the support of the Odisha Chief Minister Naveen Patnaik, Punjab Chief Minister Parkash Singh Badal, Goa Chief Minister Manohar Parrikar, BJP party president Nitin Gadkari and party leaders Lal Krishna Advani, Sushma Swaraj and Arun Jaitley, as well as the INC's Arvind Netam, who is the head of the Tribal Forum of India which supported Sangma. Prior to filing his nomination with the Rajya Sabha Secretary General V. K. Agnihotri he said that "today is a victory of tribal unity, that a tribal is filing his nomination for the post of president."

== Electoral votes ==
Party/Alliance	Percentage
United Progressive Alliance (UPA)	33.2%
National Democratic Alliance (NDA)	28%
Samajwadi Party (SP)	6.2%
Left Front	4.7%
All India Trinamool Congress (TMC)	4.4%
Bahujan Samaj Party (BSP)	3.9%
All India Anna Dravida Munnetra Kazhagam (AIADMK)	3.3%
Biju Janata Dal (BJD)	2.7%

The election's Returning Officer V. K. Agnihotri announced: "I declare that Shri Pranab Mukherjee has been duly elected to the office of President of India." Mukherjee gained 373,116 MP votes and 340,647 MLA votes for a total of 713,763 votes to win the election. He defeated Sangma, who got 145,848 MP votes and 170,139 MLA votes for a total of 315,987 votes. Mukherjee's win was aided by cross-voting. He took the oath of office on 25 July at 11:00 in the Central Hall of the parliament building. In Andhra Pradesh, the Telugu Desam Party and the Telangana Rashtra Samithi abstained from voting, while in Kerala and West Bengal, the same is not applied to the Communist Party of India and the Revolutionary Socialist Party. In Karnataka, one MLA abstained. In Assam, there were two invalid voted and one abstention. In Bihar, three voted were invalid with one abstention. In Haryana, there were 8 invalid votes. In Chhattisgarh, Himachal Pradesh and Mizoram one vote was invalid. In Jammu and Kashmir, Maharashtra, Meghalaya and Nagaland and Punjab and Sikkim, there were two invalid votes. In West Bengal, four votes were invalid.

Breakdown of the President of India election results
States	Electors	Pranab Mukherjee	Purno Agitok Sangma	Invalid/Abstained
Members of Parliament	748	527	206	15/0
Andhra Pradesh	294	182	3	5/109
Arunachal Pradesh	60	54	2	4/0
Assam	126	110	13	2/1
Bihar	240/243	146	90	3/1
Chhattisgarh	90	39	50	1/0
Goa	40	9	31	0/0
Gujarat	182	59	123	0/0
Haryana	90	53	29	8/0
Himachal Pradesh	67	23	44	1/0
Jammu and Kashmir	83/87	68	15	2/0
Jharkhand	80/81	60	20	0/0
Karnataka	220	117	103	3/1
Kerala	140	124	0	1/15
Madhya Pradesh	230	73	156	4/0
Maharashtra	272	225	47	2/0
Manipur	59	58	1	1/0
Meghalaya	59	34	23	2/0
Mizoram	40	32	7	1/0
Nagaland	60	58	0	2/0
Odisha	141	26	115	0/0
Punjab	116	44	70	2/0
Rajasthan	198	113	85	0/0
Sikkim	31	28	1	2/0
Tamil Nadu	197	45	148	4/0
Tripura	57	56	1	0/0
Uttar Pradesh	398	351	46	0/0
Uttarakhand	69	39	30	0/0
West Bengal	?	275	3	4/?
Delhi	65	42	23	0/0
Puducherry	28	23	5	0/0
Total				

=== Reactions ===
Pranab Mukherjee thanked the people of the "great country" and "express[ed] deep gratitude for electing me to high office." He later told the media that he "thank[s] all those who supported me...I thank Sangma for congratulating me. I have received much more than I have given." He also said he would "protect, defend and preserve [the Constitution of India]. I will try to justify in a modest way as I can to be trustworthy." He was also congratulated by his former party colleagues Prime Minister Manmohan Singh, Sonia Gandhi, as well as Vice-President Hamid Ansari and BJP President Nitin Gadkari.

While Sangma congratulated Mukherjee he also added: "The process in this Presidential election has been exceptionally partisan and political. The public perception is certainly that in identification and projection of its candidate, the UPA did not genuinely build consensus and that it persuaded political parties commanding major sections of the presidential electoral college by economic and other packages...as well as inducements, threats and promises. For election to the Lok Sabha and Assembly, there is a code of conduct for free and fair elections. Such a code of conduct does not exist for presidential and vice-presidential elections...Rs. 57,000 crore were given to U.P., Rs 27,000 crore to Bihar and so many other things have happened. We are meeting a day after tomorrow to review the whole situation where this matter will come up for discussion." He also added that this was an opportunity lost to elect a tribal candidate as president. INC spokesman Manish Tewari responded in saying: "Magnanimity should mark the conduct of people, who contest elections. Gritting after losing an election only endorses the proverb that grapes are sour [when you cannot reach them];" its General Secretary Janardan Dwivedi added to criticism of Sangma's allegations that "I think one should not talk with such a narrow vision."

In response to cross-voting against party lines as Mukherjee had support from 98 MLAs of the INC and JDS yet won with 19 extra votes and the Sangma got only 103 votes of BJP's 119 MLAs, Karnataka BJP General Secretary Dharmendra Pradhan said that "the party is taking this matter very seriously. The Central leadership has asked the Karnataka BJP unit to form a committee to probe this cross-voting by our MLAs. Once we get the committee's report we will take appropriate action." The issue also follows infighting within the Karnataka BJP that culminated in the recent appointment of Jagadish Shettar as chief minister.

Anti-corruption activist group Team Anna criticised Mukherjee in saying the country now had a "corrupt president." Biocon CEO Kiran Mazumdar-Shaw said of the election: "We are making a mockery of the presidential post. This is considered the highest office in our country and should be apolitical. The president should be an apolitical appointee who has the stature and integrity that can hold the political system accountable. How can persons who are in office, holding key ministerial posts, be even eligible for such a post? This is becoming a political chess game which is devaluing this very lofty post."

== See also ==
- 2012 Indian vice presidential election
