= 2007 Indian vice presidential election =

Vice-presidential election in India

| ← 2002 | 10 August 2007 | 2012 → |
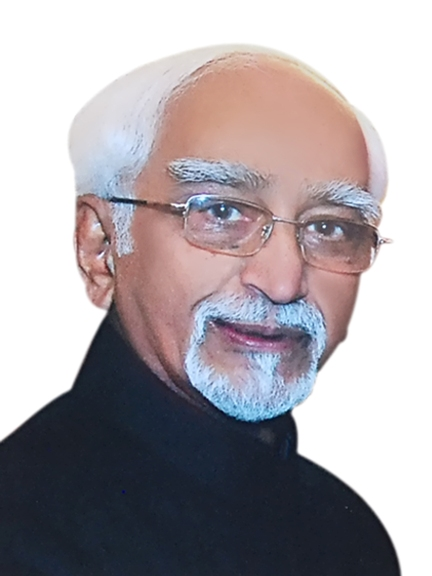

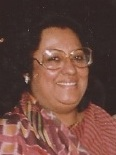
| | | | SP |
| Nominee | Mohammad Hamid Ansari | Najma Heptulla | Rasheed Masood |
| Party | INC | BJP | SP |
| Alliance | UPA | NDA | Third Front (India) |
| Home state | West Bengal | Madhya Pradesh | Uttar Pradesh |
| Electoral vote | 455 | 222 | 75 |
| Percentage | 60.50% | 29.52% | 9.98% |
Vice President before election
Bhairon Singh Shekhawat
BJP
Elected Vice President
Mohammad Hamid Ansari
INC

The 2007 Indian vice presidential election was held on 10 August 2007 to elect the vice president of India to serve from 2007 until 2012. Mohammad Hamid Ansari from Indian National Congress was elected for the post. The incumbent, Bhairon Singh Shekhawat did not seek re- election and instead ran for President in 2007 election, where he lost to Pratibha Patil. He subsequently resigned from VP four days before Patil's inauguration.

== Background ==
The term of vice-president of India is 5 years, as term of Bhairon Singh Shekhawat was up to 18 August 2007, an election was needed to elect his successor. But Shekhawat resigned on 21 July, so there occurred a little vacancy until 11 August 2007 when Ansari was sworn in.

=== Electoral college ===
The electoral college consists of, all 245 Rajya Sabha members and all 545 Lok Sabha members, a total of 790 voters.

=== Officers ===
Returning Officer : Dr. Yogendra Narain, Secretary General, Rajya Sabha
Assistant Returning Officers : N.C. Joshi & Ravi Kant Chopra

== Result ==
Result of the Indian vice-presidential election, 2007
| Candidate | Party | Electoral Votes | % of Votes |
|---|---|---|---|
| Mohammad Hamid Ansari | INC | 455 | 60.51 |
| Najma Heptulla | BJP | 222 | 29.52 |
| Rasheed Masood | SP | 75 | 9.97 |
| Total | | 762 | 100.00 |
| Valid Votes | | 752 | 98.69 |
| Invalid Votes | | 10 | 1.31 |
| Turnout | | 762 | 96.46 |
| Abstentions | | 28 | 3.54 |
| Electors | | 790 | |

== See also ==
- 2007 Indian presidential election
