= 2012 Indian vice presidential election =

Vice-presidential election in India

← 2007	7 August 2012	2017 →
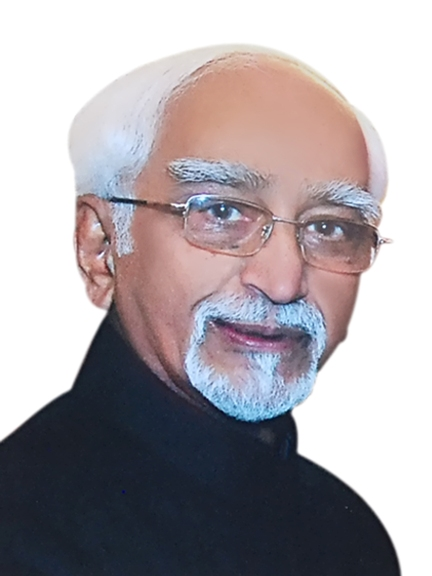

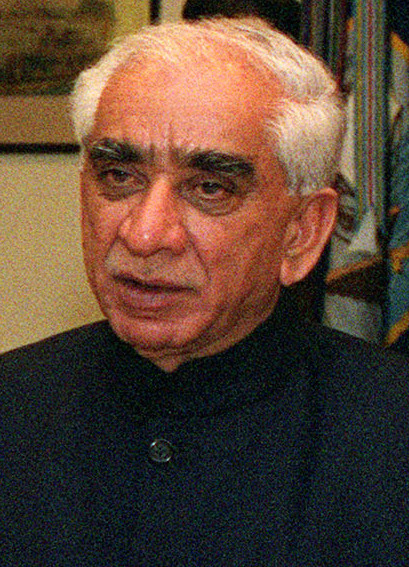
Nominee	Mohammad Hamid Ansari	Jaswant Singh
Party	INC	BJP
Alliance	UPA	NDA
Home state	West Bengal	Rajasthan
Electoral vote	490	238
Percentage	67.31%	32.69%
Vice President before election
Mohammad Hamid Ansari
INC
Elected Vice President
Mohammad Hamid Ansari
INC

The 2012 Indian vice presidential election was held on 7 August 2012 to elect the vice president of India. Mohammad Hamid Ansari was the incumbent and the UPA candidate. The other prime candidate was the NDA's Jaswant Singh.

Ansari then reelected as vice president. In doing so, he became the first VP to be reelected since Sarvepalli Radhakrishnan in 1957.

== Background ==
Indian Vice President has a term of 5 years. Current VP, Hamid Ansari, took oath as Vice President on 11 August 2007, hence his term ended on 10 August 2012. The Election Commission of India undertook the election. T. K. Viswanathan and V. R. Ramesh were appointed as Returning Officer and the Assistant Returning Officer respectively.

=== Electoral College ===
The electoral college consists of, all 245 Rajya Sabha members and all 545 Lok Sabha members, a total of 790 voters.

=== Timeline ===
According to, the Election Commission of India's press note on 3 July detailing the process of conduct and declaration of the result of the election, the program for the election was,

- Notification - 6 July.
- Deadline for nominations - 20 July.
- Scrutiny of nominations - 21 July.
- Deadline for withdrawal of nominations - 23 July
- Date and voting hours - 7 August from 10:00 to 17:00. Announcement of result at 18:00.

== Candidates ==
Thirty-four candidates had filed their nomination papers for the election. Seven of them had filed nomination papers on the deadline day. Four nomination were rejected for failing to comply with the requirement of attaching a certified copy of the entry relating to the candidate's parliamentary constituency.

=== United Progressive Alliance ===
United Progressive Alliance
For Vice-President

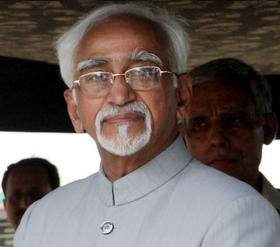

Incumbent Vice president of India
Mohammad Hamid Ansari

Indian National Congress

=== National Democratic Alliance ===
National Democratic Alliance
For Vice-President

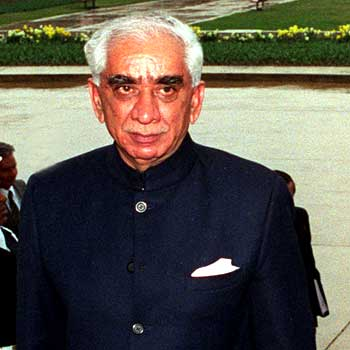

Former Minister of Finance in Vajpayee govt.
Jaswant Singh

Bharatiya Janata Party

=== Jaswant Singh ===
Jaswant Singh had filed his nomination papers on 20 July in the presence of National Democratic Alliance coalition leaders. Three sets of papers- one each by L. K. Advani, Sumitra Mahajan and Yashwant Sinha, supporting Singh's candidature were submitted to the returning officer Viswanathan. His candidature was announced by the NDA on 16 July. He would meet All India Anna Dravida Munnetra Kazhagam leader Jayalalithaa and Naveen Patnaik of Biju Janata Dal on 6 August asking them to support his candidature.

=== Hamid Ansari ===
Ansari filed his nomination papers on 18 Jul United Progressive Alliance chairperson Sonia Gandhi, Prime Minister, Manmohan Singh Samajwadi Party leader Mulayam Singh Yadav, INC general secretary Rahul Gandhi, Nationalist Congress Party leader Sharad Pawar, RLD leader Ajit Singh, National Conference leader Farooq Abdullah, Finance Minister P Chidambaram, Defence Minister A. K. Antony and RJD leader Lalu Prasad Yadav were among the political leaders who were present to support him at the time of his nomination. His candidature was announced by Sonia Gandhi at a UPA meeting held at Singh's official residence. Sonia Gandhi proposed his nomination by saying: "Mohd Hamid Ansari will complete shortly a term as Vice-President of India. He has presided over the Rajya Sabha with dignity and distinction. The UPA is honoured to nominate him as its candidate for a second term as Vice-President of India. " Sonia Gandhi, Mulayam Singh Yadav, Bahujan Samaj Party leader Satish Mishra and INCMP Motilal Vora then submitted one set of papers each to Viswanathan in support of Ansari's candidature.

Though Mukul Roy of the All India Trinamool Congress had put before the names of Gopalkrishna Gandhi and Krishna Bose, they declined to contest.

== Result ==
Ansari was elected as Vice President for a second term, and became the only person to do so after Sarvepalli Radhakrishnan, who was reelected in 1957.

Result of the Indian vice-presidential election, 2012
Candidate	Party	Electoral Votes	% of Votes
Mohammad Hamid Ansari	INC	490	67.31
Jaswant Singh	BJP	238	32.69
Total		728	100.00
Valid Votes		728	98.91
Invalid Votes		8	1.09
Turnout		736	93.16
Abstentions		54	6.84
Electors		790	

== See also ==
- 2012 Indian presidential election
