= 2017 Indian vice presidential election =

Vice-presidential election in India

- 5 August 2017
- Turnout: 98.21%
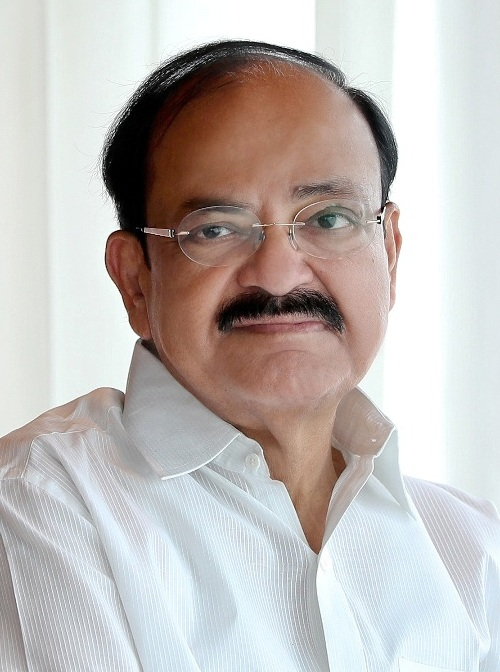

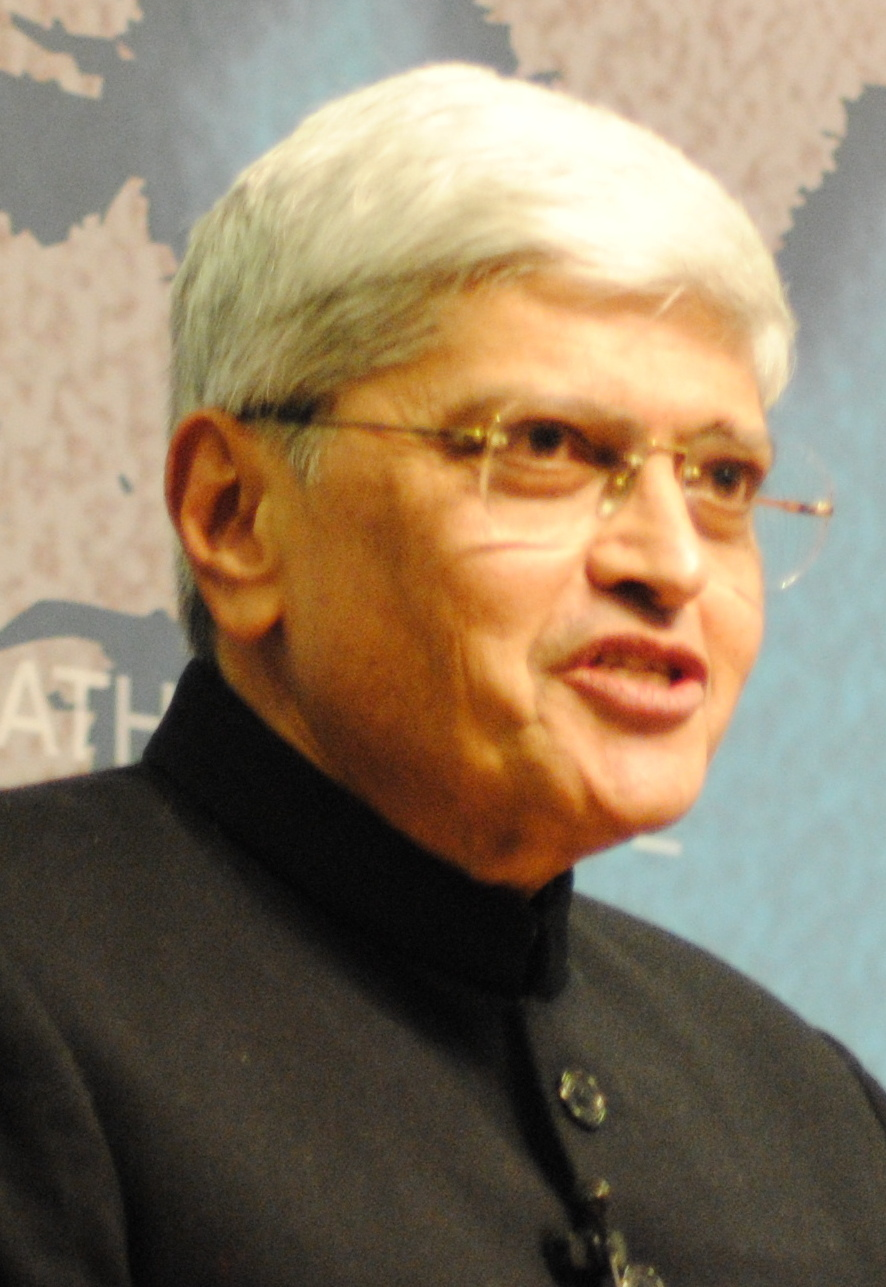
Nominee	Venkaiah Naidu	Gopalkrishna Gandhi
Party	BJP	Independent
Alliance	NDA	UPA
Home state	Andhra Pradesh	Delhi
Electoral vote	516	244
Percentage	67.89%	32.11%
Swing	35.20% ▲	35.20% ▼
Vice President before election
Mohammad Hamid Ansari
INC
Elected Vice President
Venkaiah Naidu
BJP

The elections to the next vice president of India, were held on 5 August 2017. The announcement was made by the Election Commission of India.

Rajya Sabha Secretary-General Shumsher K. Sheriff served as the Returning Officer for the 15th vice presidential election.

Vice President Mohammad Hamid Ansari, completed his second term on 10 August 2017. Venkaiah Naidu won the election and took oath as 13th vice president of India on 11 August 2017 at Darbar Hall, Rashtrapati Bhawan, New Delhi.

== Background ==
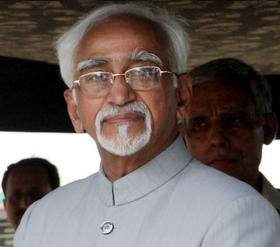
Outgoing Vice President Hamid Ansari

The Vice President of India is the exofficio chairperson of the Rajya Sabha (upper house of the Indian parliament) and functions as its speaker. He also assumes the post of the President of India in case of a vacancy and stays in the post for a maximum period of six months and performs all the functions of the President. The Vice President also has a term of five years.

During the election, the outgoing vice president was Mohammad Hamid Ansari. He was elected to the post in 2007 and re-elected in 2012. His term ended on 10 August 2017. The Election Commission of India announced that the election would be held on 5 August and the result would be declared on the same day.

== Election process ==
The Vice President is elected by an electoral college which includes members of the Rajya Sabha (the upper house of Indian parliament) and the members of the Lok Sabha (lower house of the Indian parliament). The nominated members of the mentioned houses are also eligible to vote in the election process. In the election, voting will be done by a secret ballot and the members of parliament will use a "special pen" to mark their preference.

For the 2017 election, the electoral college consists of

- Rajya Sabha members: 233 elected and 12 nominated
- Lok Sabha members: 543 elected.

== Candidates ==
A candidate participating in the election needs the support of at least 20 electors who would be the proposers of the candidate and needs to get another additional support of at least 20 seconders. The candidate also has to deposit ₹15000 ($233) as a security deposit. Two candidates were nominated for the election. One candidate was nominated by the National Democratic Alliance and another by United Progressive Alliance.

=== NDA Candidate ===
Venkaiah Naidu was nominated by National Democratic Alliance. He was the then Minister of Information and Broadcasting and Minister of Housing and Urban Poverty Alleviation of India. He had also served as a party president of Bharatiya Janata Party. Prime Minister Narendra Modi said that Naidu was a "fitting candidate" for the post. According to Indian Express leaders of the Bharatiya Janata Party felt that if Naidu got elected then it would act as a morale booster for the party in south Indian states of Telangana and Andhra Pradesh. Besides the parties of the NDA, YSR Congress party, AIADMK and Telangana Rashtra Samiti parties also pledged to support Naidu. News18 wrote that Naidu was expected to get 489 votes compared to 394 votes required to win the election.

Name	Born	Current or previous positions	State	Announced	Ref
Venkaiah Naidu	1 July 1948 (age 78); Nellore, Andhra Pradesh	Minister of Information and Broadcasting (2016–2017); Minister of Urban Development (2014–2017); Minister of Housing and Urban Poverty Alleviation (2014–2017); Minister of Rural Development (2000–2002); Rajya Sabha Member from Karnataka (1998-2016); Member, Andhra Pradesh Legislative Assembly (1978-1985); President of the Bharatiya Janata Party (2002–2004); Minister of Parliamentary Affairs (2014–2016)	Andhra Pradesh	18 July 2017	

=== UPA Candidate ===
Gopalkrishna Gandhi was the candidate nominated by the United Progressive Alliance and had the support of 18 opposition parties. He is the grandson of Mahatma Gandhi and C. Rajagopalachari, two prominent figures of the Indian freedom movement. A former diplomat, Gandhi is an alumnus of St. Stephen's College and has also served as India's ambassador to Sri Lanka, Norway and South Africa. He has also held the post of Governor of West Bengal and presided over the state during Nandigram violence. Gandhi had the support of Indian National Congress, Janata Dal (United), Rashtriya Janata Dal, Nationalist Congress Party and the Left Front.

Name	Born	Current or previous positions	State	Announced	Ref
Gopalkrishna Gandhi	22 April 1945 (age 81); Delhi	24th Governor of West Bengal (2004–2009)	Delhi	11 July 2017	

== Results ==
Following the election, Venkaiah Naidu was elected 13th vice-president of India. He has sworn in to the office on 11 August 2017. Of 790 seats in Parliament, 5 seats were vacant during the election.

Results of the Indian vice-presidential election, 2017
Candidate	Party	Electoral Votes	% of Votes
Venkaiah Naidu	BJP	516	67.89
Gopalkrishna Gandhi	Independent	244	32.11
Total		760	100.00
Valid Votes		760	96.82
Invalid Votes		11	1.40
Turnout		771	98.22
Abstentions		14	1.78
Electors		785	

== See also ==
- List of vice presidents of India
- 2017 Indian presidential election
