= 1952 Indian vice presidential election =

Vice-presidential election in India

12 May 1952	1957 →
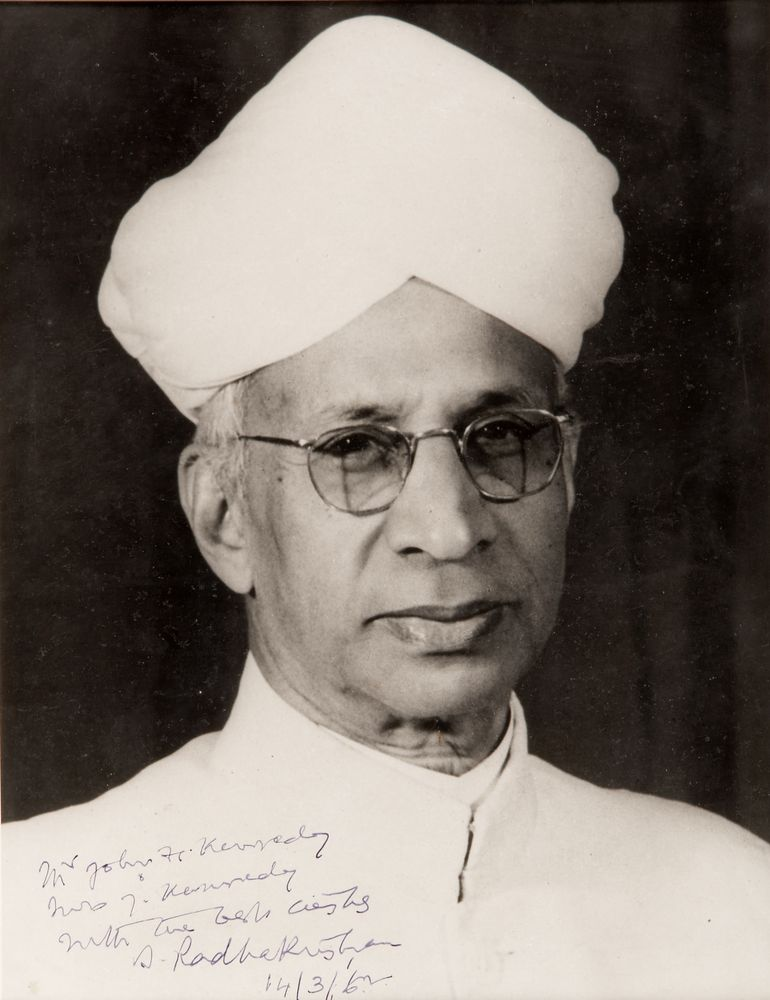
Nominee	Sarvepalli Radhakrishnan
Party	Independent
Home state	Madras
Electoral vote	Unopposed
Elected Vice President
Sarvepalli Radhakrishnan
Independent

The first Indian vice presidential election was held in 1952. Sarvepalli Radhakrishnan was elected unopposed as the first vice president. Had the election been contested by more than one candidate, the poll would have occurred on 12 May 1952.

== Schedule ==
The election schedule was announced by the Election Commission of India on 12 April 1952.

S.No.	Poll Event	Date
1.	Last Date for filing nomination	21 April 1952
2.	Date for Scrutiny of nomination	22 April 1952
3.	Last Date for Withdrawal of nomination	25 April 1952
4.	Date of Poll	12 May 1952
5.	Date of Counting	25 May 1952

== Result ==
The Electoral College consisted of 735 members of Lok Sabha and Rajya Sabha. There were two candidates who filed their nominations, S. Radhakrishnan and Janab Shaik Khadir Hussain. The Returning Officer rejected the nomination of Khadir Hussain. Since he was now the only candidate left, Dr. Radhakrishnan was declared as elected unopposed to the office of the Vice-President on 25 April 1952.

== See also ==
- 1952 Indian presidential election
