= Mohammad Hamid Ansari =

Vice President of India from 2007 to 2017

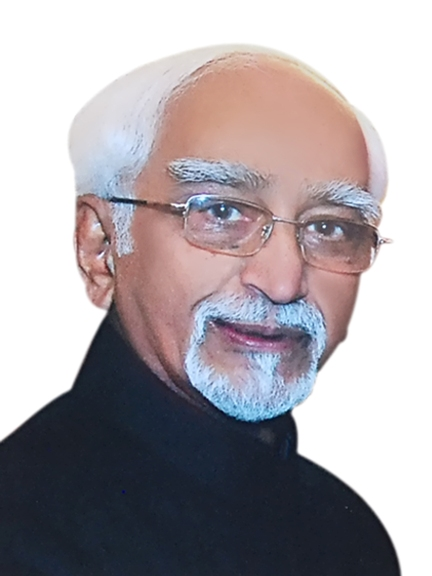
- Official Portrait, 2014

Vice President of India
- In office 11 August 2007 – 11 August 2017
- President: Pratibha Patil; Pranab Mukherjee; Ram Nath Kovind
- Prime Minister: Manmohan Singh; Narendra Modi
- Preceded by: Bhairon Singh Shekhawat
- Succeeded by: Venkaiah Naidu

Permanent Representative of India to the United Nations
- In office January 1993 – January 1995
- President: Shankar Dayal Sharma
- Preceded by: Chinmaya Gharekhan
- Succeeded by: Prakash Shah

Ambassador of India to the United Arab Emirates
- In office 6 June 1976 – 24 January 1980
- President: Fakhruddin Ali Ahmed; B. D. Jatti (interim); Neelam Sanjiva Reddy
- Preceded by: S. E. H. Rizvi
- Succeeded by: Lalit Mansingh

Personal details
- Born: 1 April 1937 (age 89) Calcutta, Bengal, British India (present-day Kolkata, West Bengal, India)
- Party: Independent
- Spouse: Salma Ansari
- Children: 3
- Education: Aligarh Muslim University
- Awards: Padma Shri
- Website: hamidansari.org

Mohammad Hamid Ansari (born 1 April 1937) is a retired Indian diplomat of the Indian Foreign Service who served as the vice president of India from 2007 to 2017.He is the first vice-president to have served under three presidents: Pratibha Patil (2007–2012), Pranab Mukherjee (2012–2017) and Ram Nath Kovind (2017).

Ansari joined the IFS in 1961. In a diplomatic career spanning 38 years, he served as the Indian ambassador to Australia, Afghanistan, Iran, and Saudi Arabia. He also served as the permanent representative of India to the United Nations between 1993 and 1995. He was appointed the vice-chancellor of the Aligarh Muslim University from 2000 to 2002. Later, he was the chairman of the National Commission for Minorities from 2006 to 2007.

He was elected as the vice-president of India on 10 August 2007 and took office on 11 August 2007. He was reelected on 7 August 2012 and was sworn in by Pranab Mukherjee, the president of India. The oath taking ceremony was conducted at Rashtrapati Bhavan on 11 August 2012. He decided not to run for a third term in the 2017 vice presidential election. His tenure is tied with Sarvepalli Radhakrishnan, for the longest vice presidential tenure in Indian history.

== Personal life ==
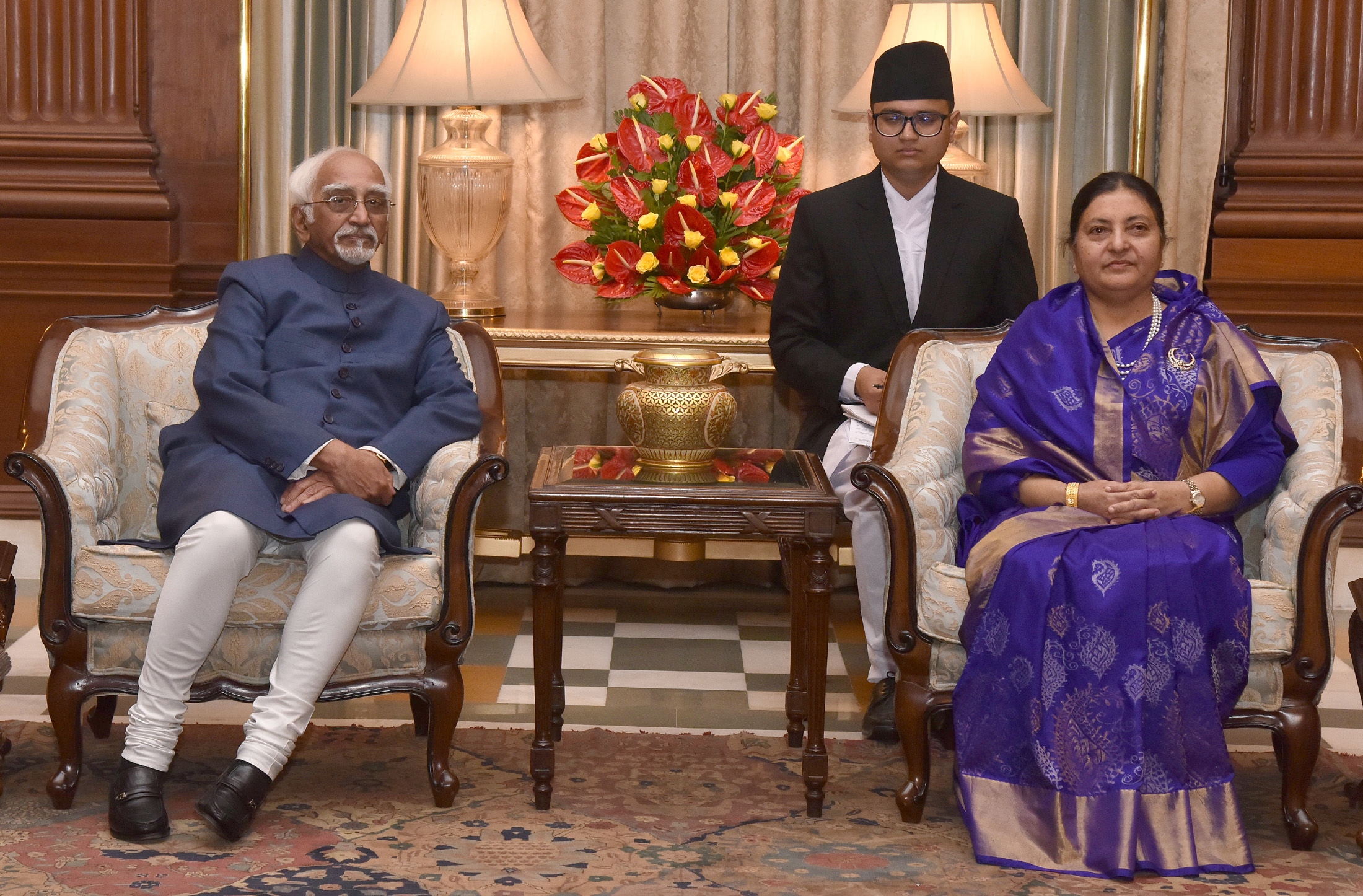
The Vice President, M. Hamid Ansari calling on the President of Nepal, Bidya Devi Bhandari, in New Delhi, 18 April 2017.

Ansari was born on 1 April 1937 in Kolkata, to Mohammad Abdul Aziz Ansari and Aasiya Begum. Though his ancestral home is in the city of Yusufpur, Ghazipur, of the Uttar Pradesh state, he spent his formative years in Kolkata. He comes from a family of Ansari sheikhs descended from the Sufi saint of Herat Abdullah Ansari. His ancestors came to India in the year 1526 with the Mughal emperor Babur and founded Yusufpur. He is the grand-nephew of former Indian National Congress president and freedom fighter Mukhtar Ahmed Ansari. He is also the second cousin to three Uttar Pradesh politicians, namely Afzal Ansari, Sibaghatullah Ansari and the mafia-turned politician Mukhtar Ansari.

Ansari received his early education from St. Edward's School, Shimla. He completed B.A. and M.A. degrees in political science from Aligarh Muslim University in Aligarh, Uttar Pradesh. He is married to Salma Ansari, fathering two sons and one daughter.

== Early career ==
=== Diplomatic career ===
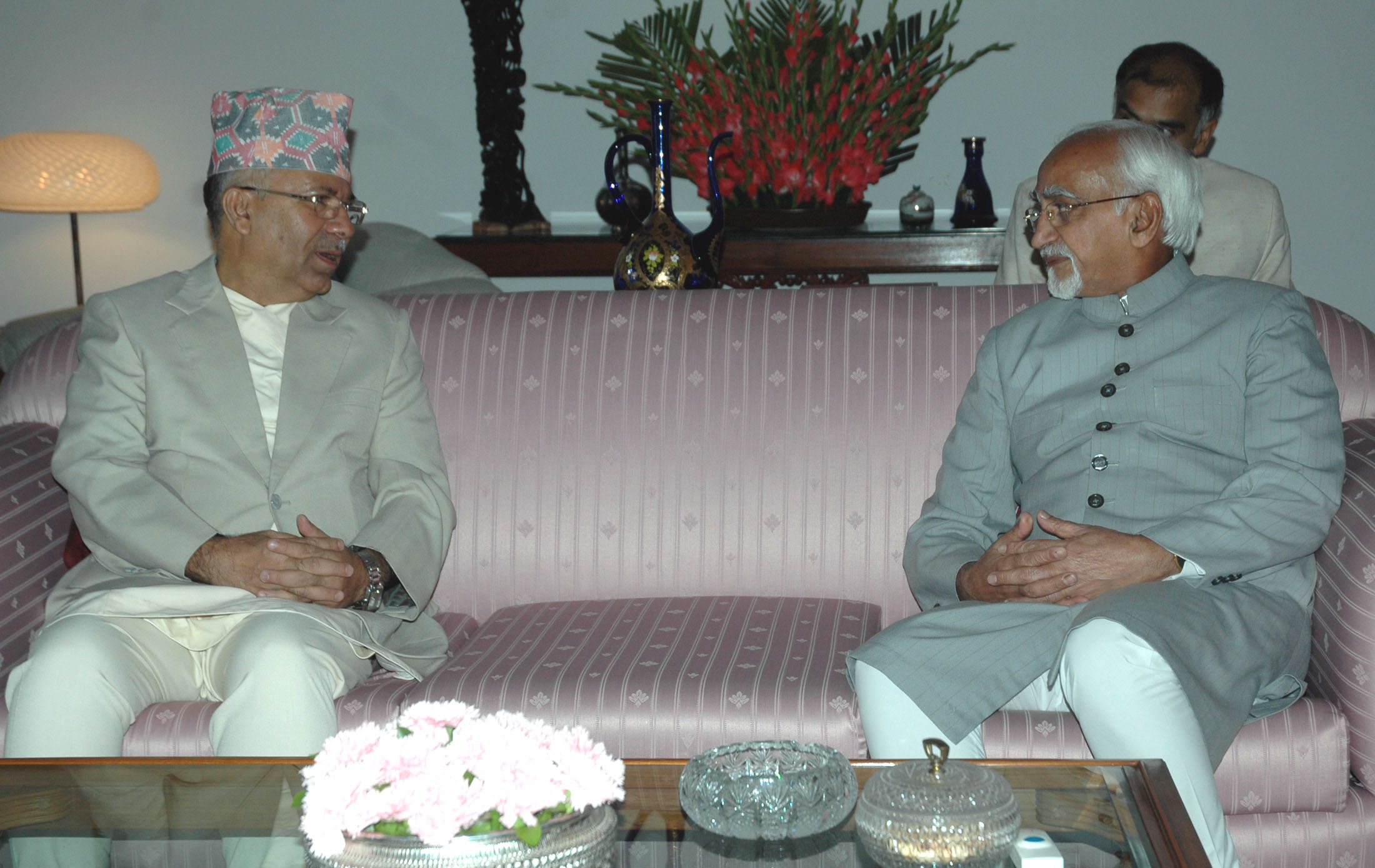
Vice President, Shri Mohammad Hamid Ansari with the former Prime Minister of Nepal, Madhav Kumar Nepal

Joining the Indian Foreign Service in 1961, Ansari subsequently served Indian missions in Baghdad, Rabat, Brussels and Jeddah. From 1976 to 1980, he served as the Indian ambassador to the United Arab Emirates. Mohan Jashanmal, the chairman of the Indian Business and Professionals Group, said that "Ansari was instrumental to get land for the Indian School from His Highness Shaikh Khalifa Bin Zayed Al Nahyan". He has also served as the Indian ambassador to Australia (1985–1989), Afghanistan (1989–1990), Iran (1990–1992), Saudi Arabia (1995–1999).

He also served as the permanent representative of India to the United Nations from 1993 to 1995. His deputy T. P. Sreenivasan wrote that while Ansari's stint as the permanent representative, he refuted Pakistan's allegations of human rights abuses in Jammu and Kashmir by "the horns and subdued it whenever necessary". He also wrote that appointing Ansari for this post at a time when "Pakistan went all out to bring Kashmir to the centre of international attention after the end of the Cold War" showed India's secular credentials.

=== Academic stints ===
After serving as a visiting professor of the West Asian and African Studies Department of Jawaharlal Nehru University from 1999 to 2000, Ansari was appointed as the vice-chancellor of the Aligarh Muslim University on 23 May 2000. After leaving the post in 2002, he served as a visiting professor of the Academy for Third World Studies Department of the Jamia Milia Islamia from 2003 to 2005.

=== Chairman of NCM ===
Ansari became the chairman of India's National Commission for Minorities (NCM) on 6 March 2006. In June 2007, Ansari, in his capacity as NCM chairman, upheld the decision of St. Stephen's Delhi to earmark a small percentage of seats for Dalit Christians. He resigned as NCM chairman soon after his nomination for the post of India's vice-president.

=== First term ===
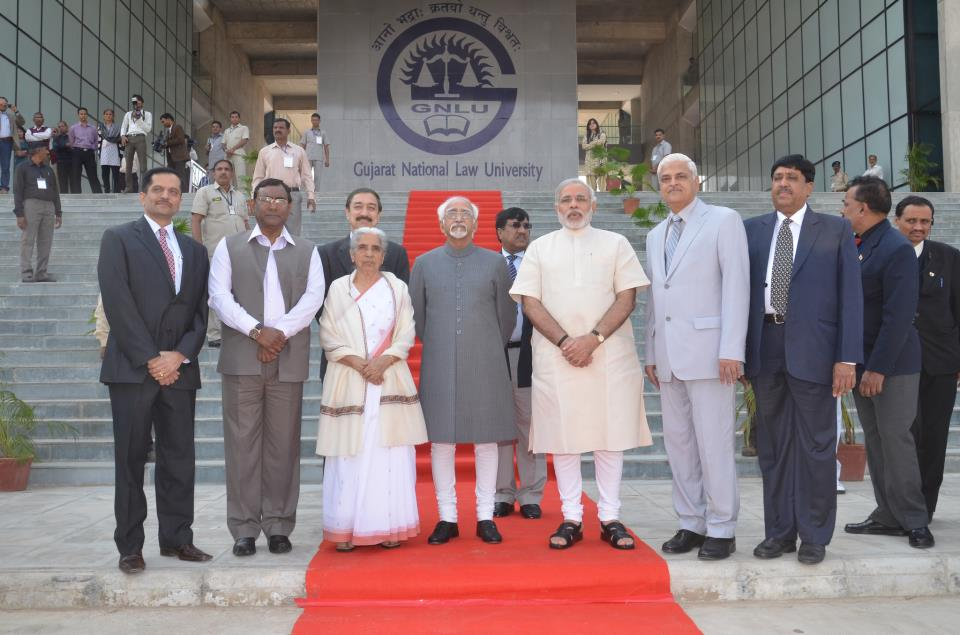
Vice President Ansari with then CM of Gujarat, the Governor of Gujarat and some Supreme court judges at the Gujarat National Law University

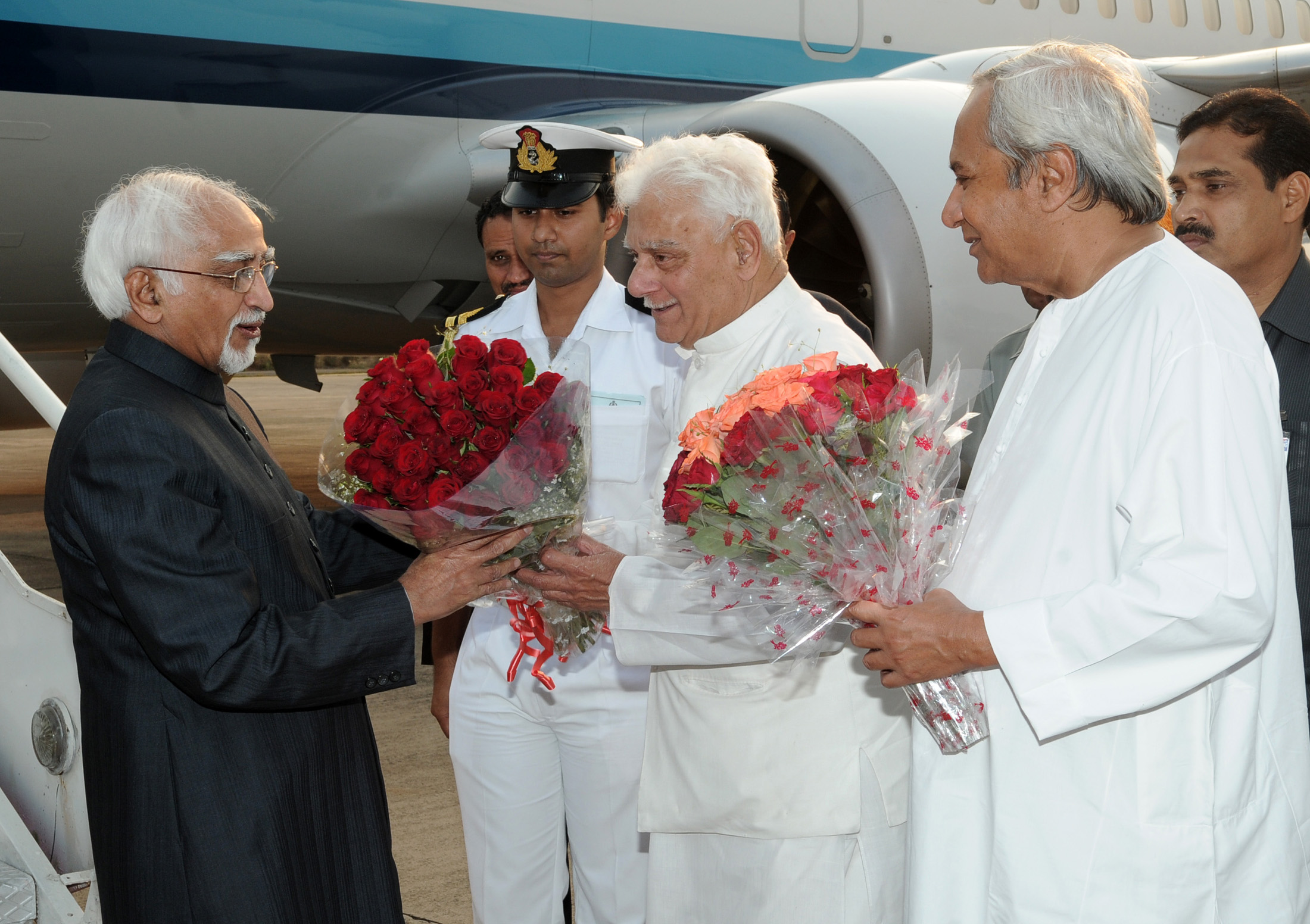
Vice President Ansari with former Odisha governor M.C. Bhandare and Odisha chief minister Naveen Patnaik

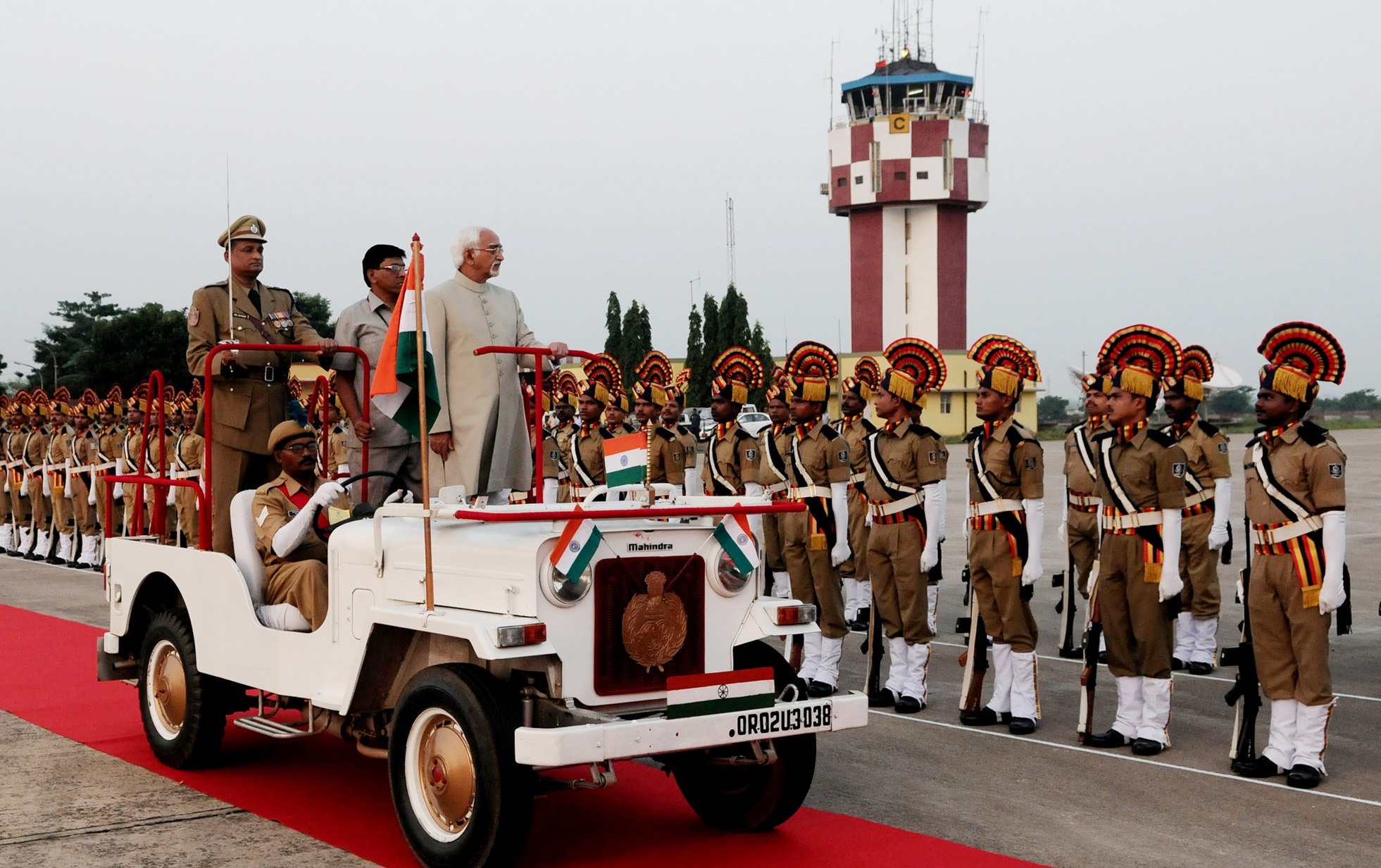
Vice President Ansari inspecting the guard of honor at Biju Patnaik International Airport

On 20 July 2007, Ansari was named by the UPA-Left, the ruling coalition in India, as its candidate for the post of Vice-President for the upcoming election. When asked, Ansari said he felt "humbled" over the UPA-Left decision naming him as their candidate. "I am humbled by the confidence reposed in me". Ansari refused to say more when asked about his prospects in the August 2007 vice-presidential election. Ansari secured 455 votes, and won the election by a margin of 233 votes against his nearest rival Najma Heptullah.

=== Second term ===
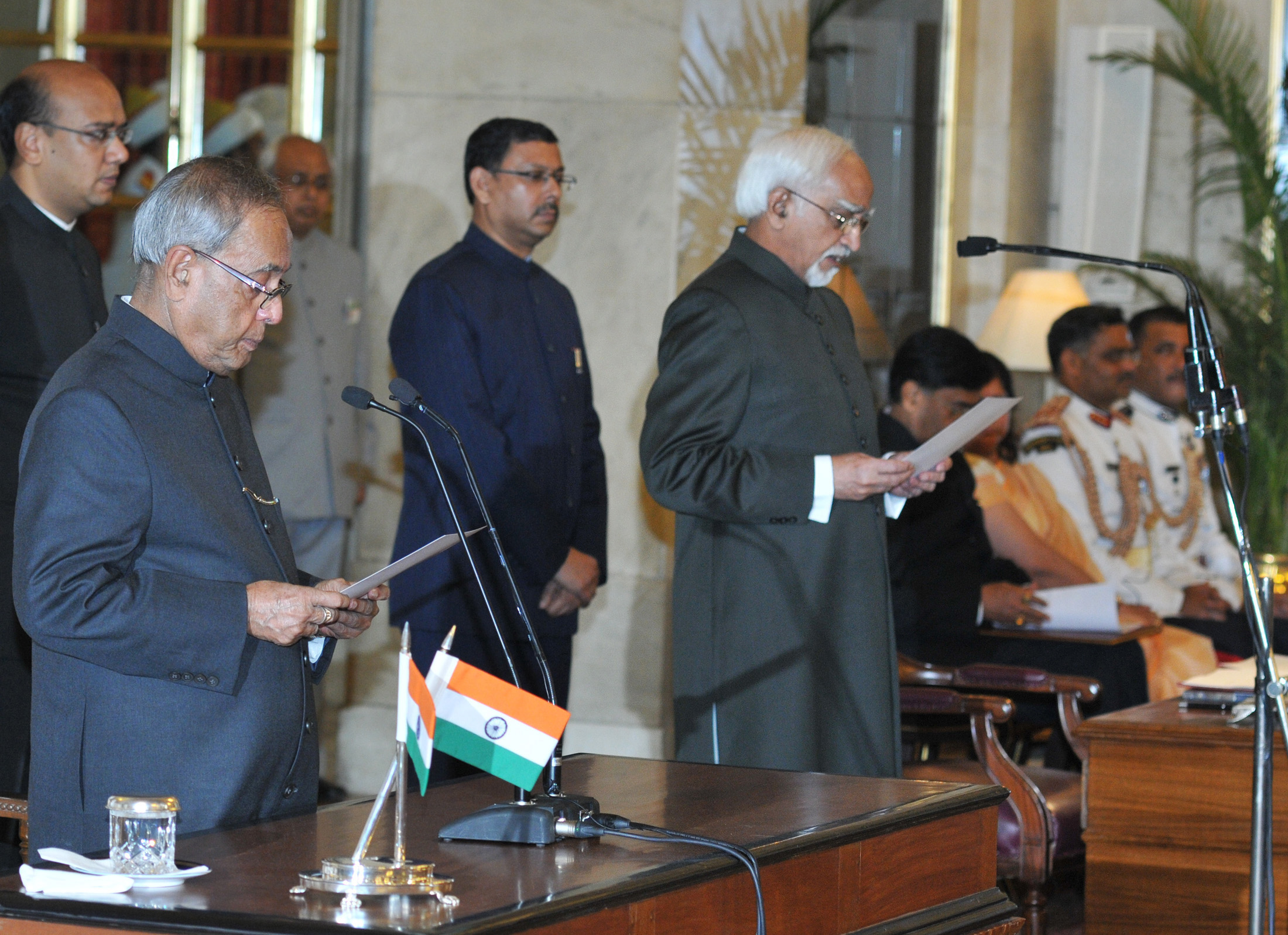
The president, Shri Pranab Mukherjee, administering the oath of office of the vice president to Shri Mohd. Hamid Ansari at a swearing-in-ceremony at Rashtrapati Bhavan, in New Delhi on 11 August 2012.

In the 2012 vice presidential election, the Congress-led UPA re-appointed Ansari as their candidate for the post of VP. Earlier, in May 2012, Lalu Prasad Yadav envisaged Ansari as a presidential candidate. The NDA nominated Jaswant Singh, former Finance, External Affairs and Defence minister as well as former Leader of Opposition. The NDA cited Ansari's conduct in the Rajya Sabha during The Lokpal Bill, 2011 debate when he had abruptly adjourned the House sine die. Hamid Ansari was re-elected for the second term on 7 August 2012, defeating the NDA's nominee Jaswant Singh by a margin of 252 votes. Ansari was the first person to be re-elected as Indian vice president after Sarvepalli Radhakrishnan in 1957.

Upon the inauguration of Ram Nath Kovind as President of India in 2017, Ansari became the first Indian vice-president to serve during the terms of three presidents. He is the longest serving vice president of India.

== Views ==
Ansari is a West Asia scholar and has written on the Palestinian issue and taken positions inconvenient to the Indian official line on Iraq and Iran. He questioned India's vote in the International Atomic Energy Agency on Iran's nuclear programme where India voted against Iran. He said that though the Indian Government claimed to have acted on "its own judgement," this was not borne out by facts.

He was the chairman of a working group on "Confidence building measures across segments of society in the State," established by the Second Round Table Conference of the Prime Minister on Jammu and Kashmir in 2006. The report of the working group was adopted by the Third Round Table in April 2007. Among other things, the report advocates recognizing the right of Kashmiri Pandits to return to "places of their original residence". This right, it argued, should be recognized without any ambiguity and made a part of state policy.

== See also ==
- List of vice presidents of India
- Syed Akbaruddin

Academic offices
Preceded by Mahmoodur Rahman	Vice-Chancellor of AMU; 2000–2002	Succeeded by Naseem Ahmad
Political offices
Preceded by Bhairon Singh Shekhawat	Vice President of India; 2007–2017	Succeeded by Venkaiah Naidu
