= 1952 Indian presidential election =

First Indian presidential election

- 2 May 1952
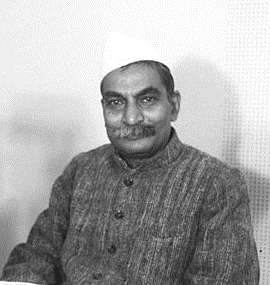

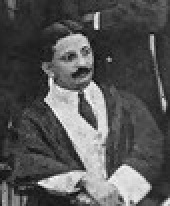
Nominee	Rajendra Prasad	K. T. Shah
Party	INC	Independant
Home state	Bihar	Bombay
Electoral vote	507,400	92,827
Percentage	83.81%	15.33%
President before election
Rajendra Prasad (Interim)
INC
Elected President
Rajendra Prasad
INC

The Election Commission of India held the first presidential elections of India on 2 May 1952. Dr. Rajendra Prasad won his first election with 507,400 votes (83.81%) over his nearest rival K. T. Shah who got 92,827 votes (15.3%).

== Schedule ==
The election schedule was announced by the Election Commission of India on 4 April 1952.

S.No.	Poll Event	Date
1.	Last Date for filing nomination	12 April 1952
2.	Date for Scrutiny of nomination	14 April 1952
3.	Last Date for Withdrawal of nomination	17 April 1952
4.	Date of Poll	2 May 1952
5.	Date of Counting	6 May 1952

== Results ==
Source: Web archive of Election Commission of India website

Candidate	Electoral Values
Rajendra Prasad	507,400
K. T. Shah	92,827
Lakshman Ganesh Thatte	2,672
Chaudhary Hari Ram	1,954
Krishna Kumar Chatterjee	533
Total	605,386

== See also ==
- 1952 Indian vice presidential election
