= 2002 Indian vice presidential election =

Vice-presidential election in India

- 12 August 2002
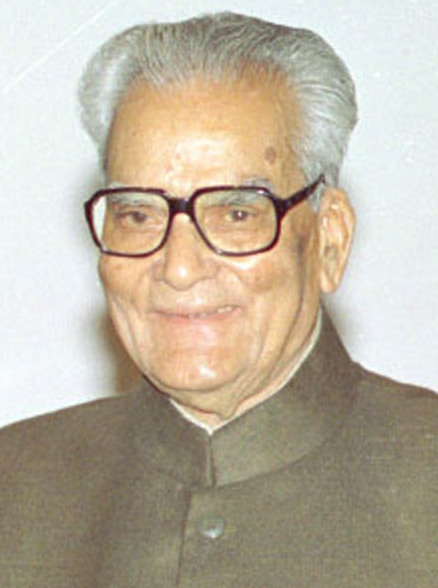

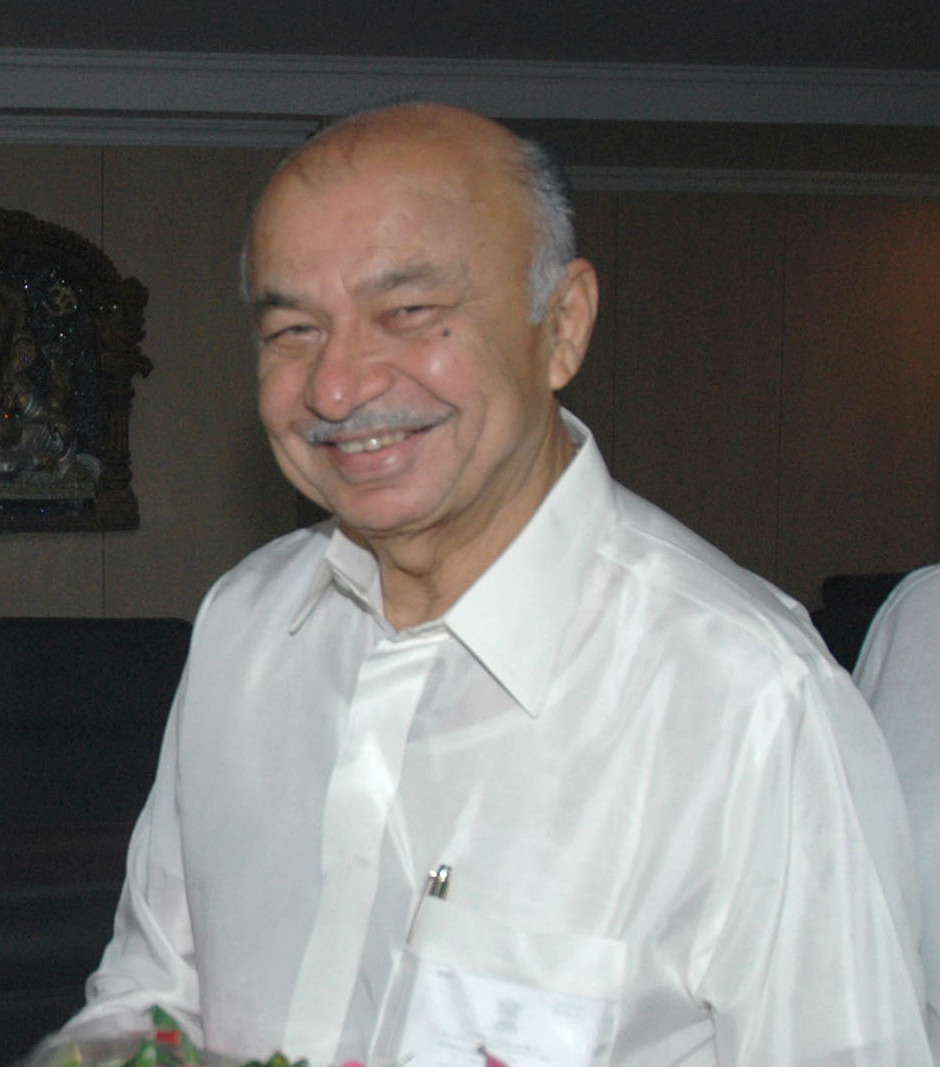
Nominee	Bhairon Singh Shekhawat	Sushil Kumar Shinde
Party	BJP	INC
Alliance	NDA	INC Alliance
Home state	Rajasthan	Maharashtra
Electoral vote	454	305
Percentage	59.82%	40.18%
Vice President before election
Vacant, last held by
Krishan Kant
JD
Elected Vice President
Bhairon Singh Shekhawat
BJP

The 2002 Indian vice presidential election was held on 12 August 2002 to elect the newly vacated post of the vice president of India. Bhairon Singh Shekhawat defeated Sushil Kumar Shinde to become 11th vice president of India. Incumbent VP Krishan Kant did not contest the election and died before the election occurred. Sekhawat got nearly 60% of votes.

== Candidates ==
=== National Democratic Alliance ===
National Democratic Alliance
For Vice President

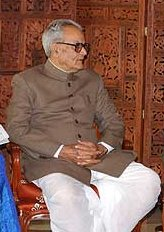

Leader of Opposition of the Rajasthan Legislative Assembly
Bhairon Singh Shekhawat

Bharatiya Janata Party

=== Congress Alliance ===
Indian National Congress
For Vice President

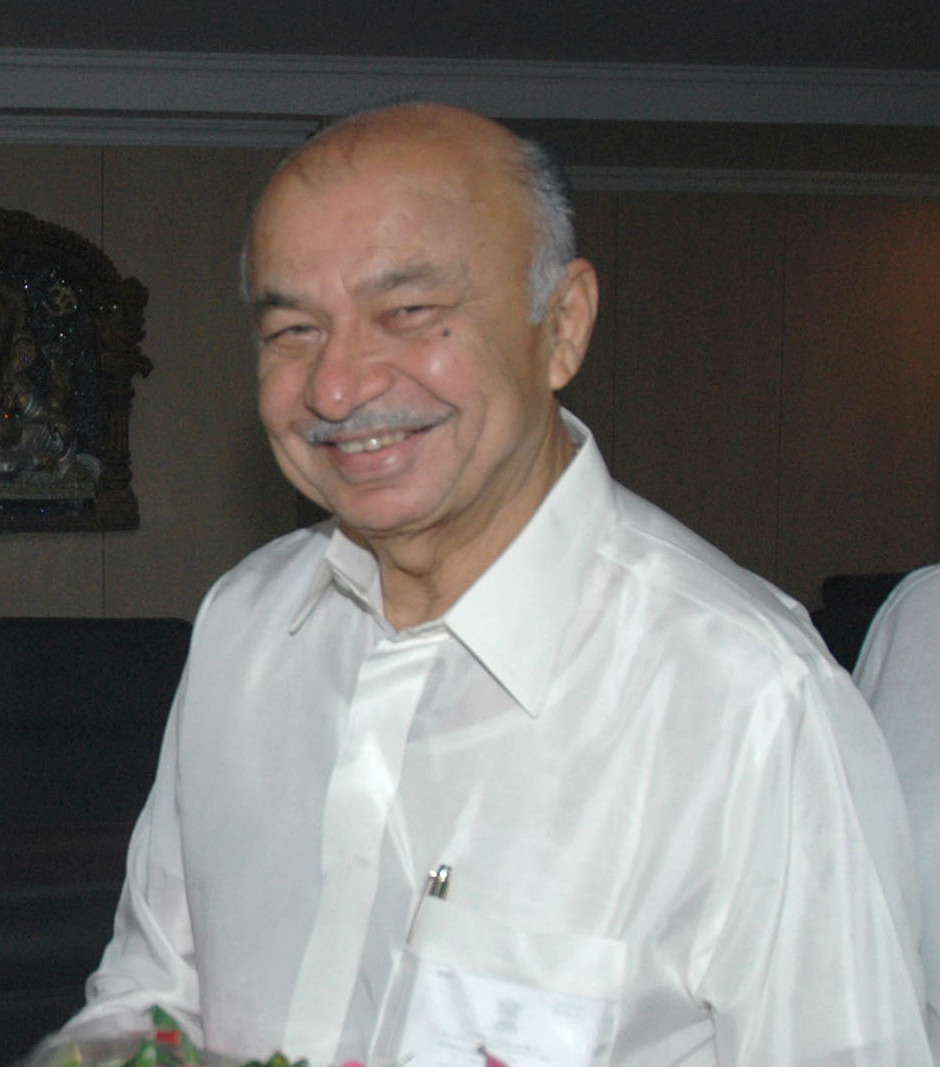

Member of Lok Sabha for Solapur
Sushil Kumar Shinde

Indian National Congress

== Results ==
Result of the Indian vice-presidential election, 2002
Candidate	Party	Electoral Votes	% of Votes
Bhairon Singh Shekhawat	BJP	454	59.82
Sushil Kumar Shinde	INC	305	40.18
Total		759	100.00
Valid Votes		759	99.09
Invalid Votes		7	0.91
Turnout		766	96.96
Abstentions		24	3.04
Electors		790	

== See also ==
- 2002 Indian presidential election
