= Vice President of India =

Second-highest constitutional office in India

- Bhārata Ke Uparāṣṭrapati
- Emblem of The Republic of India

- Flag of India

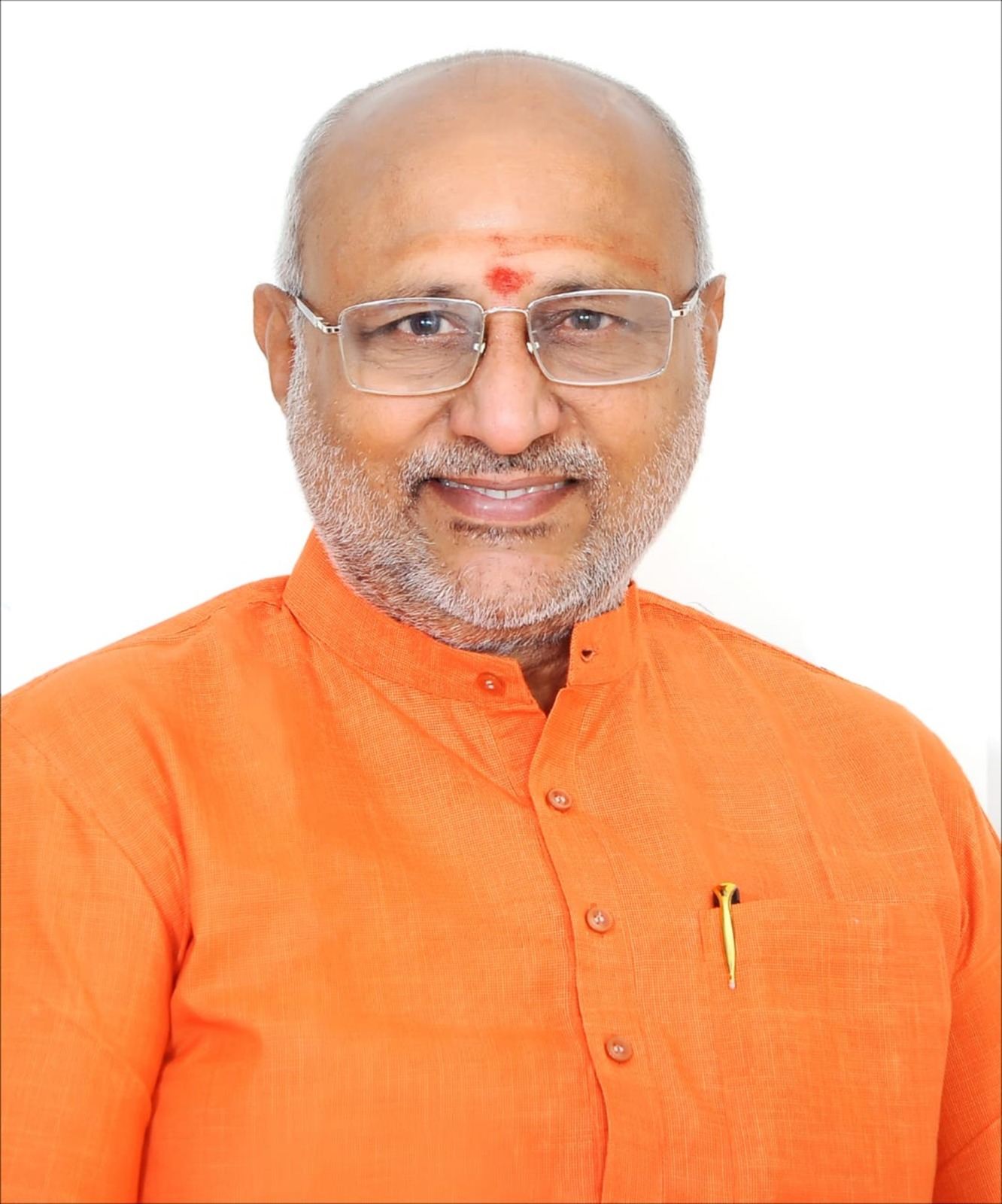
- Incumbent; C. P. Radhakrishnan since 12 September 2025
- Style: The Honourable (formal); Mr. Vice President (informal); His Excellency (in diplomatic correspondence)
- Status: Deputy Head of State; Chairman of the Rajya Sabha (ex-officio)
- Abbreviation: VP/V-P
- Residence: Vice President's Enclave
- Seat: Sansad Bhavan, New Delhi
- Appointer: Electoral College of India
- Term length: Five years; Renewable
- Constituting instrument: Article 63 of the Constitution of India
- Inaugural holder: Sarvepalli Radhakrishnan (1950–1962)
- Formation: 26 January 1950; 76 years ago
- Deputy: Deputy Chairperson in Rajya Sabha
- Salary: ₹400,000 (US$4,300) per month ₹4,800,000 (US$51,000) per year
- Website: vicepresidentofindia.gov.in

The Vice President of India (ISO: Bhārata Ke Uparāṣṭrapati) is the deputy head of state of the Republic of India, i.e. next to the president of India. The office of vice president is the second-highest constitutional office after the president and first in the line of succession to the presidency.

The vice president is the Chairperson of the Rajya Sabha and ranks 2nd in the Order of Precedence of India.

Article 66 of the Constitution of India states the manner of election of the vice president. The vice president is elected indirectly by members of an electoral college consisting of the members of both Houses of Parliament and not the members of state legislative assembly by the system of proportional representation using single transferable votes and the voting is conducted by Election Commission of India via secret ballot.

The vice president is also the Chancellor of the Panjab University, University of Delhi and Pondicherry University and also Visitor of Makhanlal Chaturvedi National University of Journalism and Communication. The position holder also serves as President of Indian Institute of Public Administration.

== Election, oath and term ==
=== Qualifications ===
As in the case of the president, to be qualified to be elected as vice president, a person must:

- Be a citizen of India.
- Be at least 35 years of age.
- Not to be holding any office of profit.
- Not necessary to be an MP but should be eligible for Rajya Sabha seat

Unlike in the case of the speaker, where a person is a member of the Lok Sabha, the vice president must be qualified for election as a member of the Rajya Sabha. This difference is because the vice president is to act as the ex officio chairperson of the Rajya Sabha. At a time the vice president acts in either of two capacities (i.e. chairperson of the Rajya Sabha or vice president of India); he cannot act in both offices simultaneously.

=== Election ===
The conduct and procedure of the election of both the president and vice president is outlined in the Presidential and Vice-Presidential Elections Act of 1952.

The vice president is elected indirectly, by an electoral college consisting of both elected and nominated members of both the Lok Sabha and Rajya Sabha, by the system of proportional representation using single transferable votes and the voting is by secret ballot. The election of the vice president differs from the election of the president in that the members of state legislatures are not part of the electoral college for the vice president, while the nominated members of Rajya Sabha are included.

The nomination of a candidate for election to the office of the vice president must be subscribed by at least 20 electors as proposers and 20 electors as seconders. Every candidate has to make a security deposit of ₹15,000 (US$160) in the Reserve Bank of India.

The Election Commission of India, which is a constitutional autonomous body, conducts the election. The election is to be held no later than 60 days of the expiry of the term of office of the outgoing vice president. A returning officer is appointed for the election, usually the secretary-general of either House of Parliament, by rotation. The returning officer issues a public notice of the intended election, inviting nomination of candidates. Any person qualified to be elected and intending to stand for election is required to be nominated by at least twenty members of Parliament as proposers, and at least twenty other members of Parliament as seconders. The nomination papers are scrutinized by the returning officer, and the names of all eligible candidates are added to the ballot.

The election is held via proportional representation using single transferable votes by secret ballot. Voters stack-rank the candidates, assigning 1 to their first preference, 2 to their second preference, and so on. The number of votes required by a candidate to secure the election is calculated by dividing the total number of valid cast votes by two and adding one to the quotient by disregarding any remainder. If no candidate obtains the required number of first-preference votes, the candidate with the fewest first-preference votes is eliminated and his or her second-preference votes are transferred. The process is repeated until a candidate obtains the requisite number of votes. Nominated members can also participate in the election.

After the election has been held and the votes counted, the returning officer declares the result of the election to the electoral college. Thereafter, the returning officer reports the result to the Government of India (Ministry of Law and Justice) and the Election Commission of India, and the government publishes the name of the person elected as vice president, in the Official Gazette.

The vice president may resign office by submitting a letter of resignation to the president. The resignation becomes effective from the day it is accepted.

If the vice president resigns then the vacant post has to be filled as soon as possible whereas in the case of president, election has to be held within six months.

The spouse of a vice president is known as the second lady of India.

=== Election disputes ===
All disputes arising in connection with the election of the vice president are petitioned to the Supreme Court of India, which inquires into the matter. The petition is heard by a five-member bench of the Supreme Court, which decides on the matter. The decision of the Supreme Court is final.

The Supreme Court inquires into and decides upon all doubts and disputes arising out of or in connection with the election of the vice president per Article 71(1) of the constitution. The Supreme Court can remove the vice president for committing electoral malpractices or upon being ineligible to be a Rajya Sabha member under the Representation of the People Act, 1951. Subject to Article 71 (3), Parliament has made applicable rules or procedure to petition the Supreme Court for resolving the disputes that arise only during the election process of the vice president but not the doubts that arise from his unconstitutional actions or deeds or changing citizenship during his tenure which may violate the requisite election qualifications. The Supreme Court shall also expeditiously decide any doubt raised by which the elected vice president could be ineligible to be a Rajya Sabha member for the unconstitutional acts committed before becoming vice president. Under Article 71(1), it is the responsibility of the Supreme Court to inquire and decide about the so-called unconstitutional acts committed by the vice president such as turning down the notice of the Rajya Sabha members to impeach the chief justice of India and other judges of Supreme Court and High Courts per Article 124(4) and Judges (Inquiry) Act, 1968 or allowing a bill passed under simple majority instead of procedure applicable to constitutional amendment or falsely declaring a bill passed.

=== Oath or affirmation ===
Article 69 of the Constitution of India provides for the oath or affirmation for the office of vice president as follows:-
"I, A.B., do swear in the name of God /solemnly affirm that I will bear true faith and allegiance to the Constitution of India as by law established and that I will discharge the duty upon which I am about to enter."
The president administers the oath of office and secrecy to the vice president.

=== Term ===
The vice president holds office for five years. The vice president can be re-elected any number of times. However, the office may be terminated earlier by death, resignation, or removal. The Constitution does not provide a mechanism of succession to the office of vice president in the event of an extraordinary vacancy, apart from re-election. However, the deputy chairperson of the Rajya Sabha can perform the vice president's duties as the chairperson of the Rajya Sabha in such an event.

However, when the president dies in office and vice president takes over as president, the vice president can continue serving as the president for a maximum of 6 months within which a new president shall be elected.

== Removal ==
The Constitution states that the vice president can be removed by a resolution of the Rajya Sabha passed by an effective majority (majority of all the then members) and agreed by the Lok Sabha with a simple majority (Article 67(b)). But no such resolution may be moved unless at least 14 days notice in advance has been given. Notably, the Constitution does not list grounds for removal. The removal of chairperson in the Rajya Sabha cannot be challenged in any court of law per Article 122. Before Jagdeep Dhankhar no vice president has ever faced removal, although the motion for removal of Jagdeep Dhankhar was not accepted in the Rajya Sabha.

The Supreme Court can inquire into and decide on the disputes related to election of the vice president as per Article 71(1) of the constitution. However, the constitution does not mention any specific ground on which the vice president can be removed.

== Salary and pension ==
There is no provision for the salary of the vice president of India in that capacity. The vice president receives a salary in the capacity of the ex officio chairperson of the Rajya Sabha, which is currently ₹400,000 (US$4,300) per month (revised from ₹125,000 in 2018). In addition, the vice president is entitled to free furnished residence, medical, travel, and other facilities. The constitution provides that when the vice president acts as the president or discharges the duties of the president, the vice president is entitled to the salary and privileges of the president. The pension for the vice president is 50% of the salary. In fact, he is the only official who does not get any salary and emoluments of his designated post (i.e. vice president).

== List ==
This list is numbered based on vice presidents elected after winning an Indian vice presidential election. The vice president of India does not represent any political party. The colors used in the table indicate the related party from which they originally came.

#	Portrait	Name (born–died)	Term of office			Election	President	Party
1.		Sarvepalli Radhakrishnan (1888–1975)	13 May 1952	13 May 1957	10 years	1952 (Unopposed)	Rajendra Prasad	Independent
1.		Sarvepalli Radhakrishnan (1888–1975)	13 May 1957	13 May 1962	10 years	1957 (Unopposed)	Rajendra Prasad	Independent
2.		Zakir Husain (1897–1969)	13 May 1962	13 May 1967	5 years	1962 (95.3%)	Sarvepalli Radhakrishnan	Independent
3.		V. V. Giri (1894–1980)	13 May 1967	3 May 1969^{[RES]} (Note: Resigned after being elected as the President of India.)	1 year, 355 days	1967 (71.45%)	Zakir Husain	Independent
Position Vacant (3 May 1969 – 31 August 1969) – 120 days,
4.		Gopal Swarup Pathak (1896–1982)	31 August 1969	31 August 1974	5 years	1969 (52.7%)	Varahagiri Venkata Giri Fakhruddin Ali Ahmed	Independent
5.		B. D. Jatti (1912–2002)	31 August 1974	31 August 1979	5 years	1974 (78.7%)	Fakhruddin Ali Ahmed Neelam Sanjiva Reddy	Indian National Congress (R)
6.		Mohammad Hidayatullah (1905–1992)	31 August 1979	31 August 1984	5 years	1979 (Unopposed)	Neelam Sanjiva Reddy Zail Singh	Independent
7.		Ramaswamy Venkataraman (1910–2009)	31 August 1984	24 July 1987^{[RES]}	2 years, 327 days	1984 (71.05%)	Zail Singh	Indian National Congress (I)
Position Vacant (24 July 1987 – 3 September 1987) – 41 days,
8.		Shankar Dayal Sharma (1912–1999)	3 September 1987	24 July 1992^{[RES]}	4 years, 325 days	1987 (Unopposed)	Ramaswamy Venkataraman	Indian National Congress (I)
Position Vacant (24 July 1992 – 21 August 1992) – 28 days,
9.		K. R. Narayanan (1920–2005)	21 August 1992	24 July 1997^{[RES]}	4 years, 337 days	1992 (99.86%)	Shankar Dayal Sharma	Indian National Congress (I)
Position Vacant (24 July 1997 – 21 August 1997) – 28 days,
10.		Krishan Kant (1927–2002)	21 August 1997	27 July 2002 (Note: Died in Office)	4 years, 340 days	1997 (61.76%)	K. R. Narayanan A. P. J. Abdul Kalam	Janata Dal
Position Vacant (27 July 2002 – 19 August 2002) – 23 days,
11.		Bhairon Singh Shekhawat (1925–2010)	19 August 2002	21 July 2007^{[RES]} (Note: Resigned to contest the 2007 Indian presidential election, but lost to Pratibha Patil.)	4 years, 336 days	2002 (59.82%)	A. P. J. Abdul Kalam	Bharatiya Janata Party
Position Vacant (21 July 2007 – 11 August 2007) – 21 days,
12.		Mohammad Hamid Ansari (born 1937)	11 August 2007	11 August 2012	10 years	2007 (60.5%)	Pratibha Patil Pranab Mukherjee	Indian National Congress
12.		Mohammad Hamid Ansari (born 1937)	11 August 2012	11 August 2017	10 years	2012 (67.31%)	Pranab Mukherjee	Indian National Congress
13.		Venkaiah Naidu (born 1949)	11 August 2017	11 August 2022	5 years	2017 (67.89%)	Ram Nath Kovind Droupadi Murmu	Bharatiya Janata Party
14.		Jagdeep Dhankhar (born 1951)	11 August 2022	21 July 2025^{[RES]} (Note: Resigned)	2 years, 344 days	2022 (74.37%)	Droupadi Murmu	Bharatiya Janata Party
Position Vacant (21 July 2025 – 12 September 2025) – 53 days,
15.		C. P. Radhakrishnan (born 1957)	12 September 2025	Incumbent	1 year, 65 days	2025 (60.1%)	Droupadi Murmu	Bharatiya Janata Party

== Oath of Office ==
The oath of office for the Vice President of India is as follows:

I, (name), do swear in the name of God (or, solemnly affirm) that I will bear true faith and allegiance to the Constitution of India as by law established, and that I will faithfully discharge the duty upon which I am about to enter.

— Article 69, Constitution of India

Oath of office of Vice President of India in Hindi Version

मैं, (अमुक), ईश्वर की शपथ लेता हूँ (सत्यनिष्ठा से प्रतिज्ञान करता हूँ) कि मैं विधि द्वारा स्थापित भारत के संविधान के प्रति सच्ची श्रद्धा और निष्ठा रखूँगा, तथा जिस पद को मैं ग्रहण करने वाला हूँ उसके कर्तव्यों का श्रद्धापूर्वक निर्वहन करूँगा।

— अनुच्‍छेद 69, भारत का संविधान

== See also ==
- President of India
- Prime Minister of India
- Union Council of Ministers
- Deputy Chairperson of the Rajya Sabha
- Speaker of the Lok Sabha
- Deputy Speaker of the Lok Sabha
- Leader of the House in Rajya Sabha
- Leader of the Opposition in Rajya Sabha
- Leader of the House in Lok Sabha
- Leader of the Opposition in Lok Sabha
- Secretary General of the Rajya Sabha
