= United Progressive Alliance =

Defunct political coalition in India

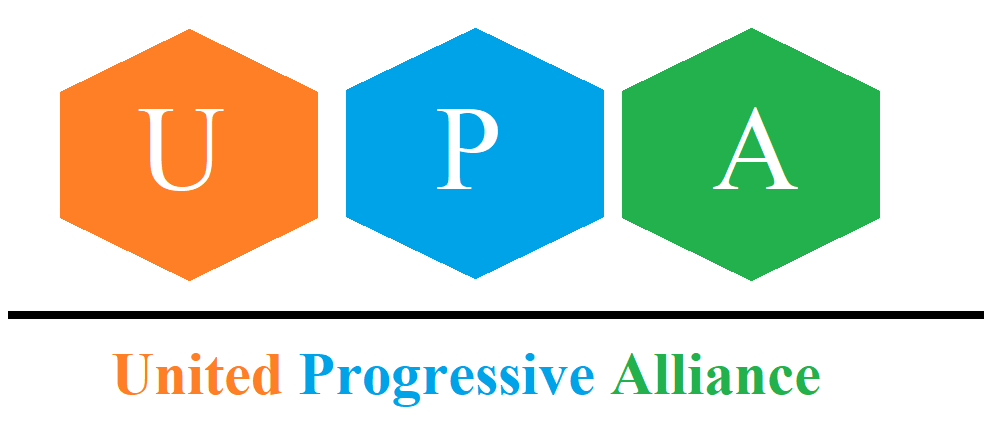
- Abbreviation: UPA
- Founder: Sonia Gandhi
- Founded: 6 May 2004; 22 years ago
- Dissolved: 19 July 2023; 3 years ago
- Succeeded by: Indian National Developmental Inclusive Alliance (INDIA)
- Ideology: Liberalism; Social liberalism
- Political position: Centre to centre-left

The United Progressive Alliance (UPA) was a political alliance in India led by the Indian National Congress. It was formed after the 2004 general election with support from left-leaning political parties when no single party got the majority.

The UPA subsequently governed India from 2004 until 2014 for two terms before losing power to their main rivals, the BJP-led National Democratic Alliance. The UPA used to rule seven States and union territories of India before it was dissolved to form the Indian National Developmental Inclusive Alliance on 18 July 2023 ahead of the 2024 general election.

== History ==
=== 2004–2008 ===
UPA was formed soon after the 2004 Indian general election when no party had won a majority. The then ruling Bharatiya Janata Party-led National Democratic Alliance (NDA) won 181 seats of 544, as opposed to the UPA's tally of 218 seats.

The Left Front with 59 MPs (excluding the speaker of the Lok Sabha), the Samajwadi Party with 39 MPs and the Bahujan Samaj Party with 19 MPs were other significant blocks that supported UPA at various times. UPA did not achieve a majority, rather it relied on external support, similar to the formula adopted by the previous minority governments of the United Front, the NDA, the Congress government of P. V. Narasimha Rao, and earlier governments of V. P. Singh and Chandra Shekhar.

An informal alliance had existed prior to the elections as several of the constituent parties had developed seat-sharing agreements in many states. After the election the results of negotiations between parties were announced. The UPA government's policies were initially guided by a common minimum programme that the alliance hammered out with consultations with Jyoti Basu and Harkishan Singh Surjeet of the 59-member Left Front. Hence, government policies were generally perceived as centre-left, reflecting the centrist policies of the INC.

During the tenure of Jharkhand Chief Minister Madhu Koda, the constituents of the UPA were, by mutual consent, supporting his government.

On 22 July 2008, the UPA survived a vote of confidence in the parliament brought on by the Left Front withdrawing their support in protest at the India–United States Civil Nuclear Agreement. The Congress party and its leaders along with then Samajwadi Party leader Amar Singh were accused of a "cash for vote" scam as part of the cash-for-votes scandal, in which they were accused of buying votes in Lok Sabha to save the government. During UPA I, the economy saw steady economic growth and many people (100 million+) escaped poverty.

=== 2009–2014 ===
In the 2009 Lok Sabha election, the UPA won 262 seats, of which the INC accounted for 206. During UPA II, the alliance won election in Maharashtra, Haryana and Arunachal Pradesh. However, there were several allegations of scams during its tenure that impacted UPA's image nationwide and the approval rating for the government fell. In addition, many members left for YSRCP. This started a domino effect with members leaving to form their own parties and parties such as DMK leaving the alliance altogether. During this time UPA struggled with state election and leadership stability. The alliance suffered a defeat in 2014 Indian general election as it won only 60 seats. In addition, UPA won only one state election and got wiped out from Andhra Pradesh where they previously had 150+ MLAs.

=== 2015–2019 ===
From 2014 to 2017, UPA won only 3 state elections. This was blamed on the alliance's failed leadership and weakness compared to the NDA. In addition the party lost power in states where they had once won state elections as in Bihar. In 2017 the alliance lost again. In 2018 UPA had a phenomenal comeback in the state elections as the party won important in Karnataka, Rajasthan and others. More parties joined the alliance and it was stronger than ever.

In the 2019 Indian general election the UPA won only 91 seats in the general election and INC won 52 seats, thus failing to secure 10% seats required for the leader of opposition post. The alliance lost another state to the BJP with the party winning by-polls and pushing the UPA into the minority.

Towards the end of 2019, the alliance made huge gains in Haryana, won in Jharkhand and formed a state-level alliance called Maha Vikas Aghadi (MVA) to form the government in Maharashtra with Uddhav Thackeray of Shiv Sena leading the ministry. Shiv Sena had been a member of NDA for twenty five years. It left NDA and joined MVA in 2019.

=== 2020–2023 ===
Since 2020, more parties joined the alliance. The alliance lost the Bihar election that it was expected to win but in 2022, ruling party JD(U) left National Democratic Alliance and rejoined Mahagathbandhan to form the government in Bihar.

In addition UPA only won 1 out of the 5 state elections in 2021. However the alliance made significant gains in a number of MLA races. MVA lost control of Maharashtra due to crisis and split in Shiv Sena. Moreover, UPA lost in Gujarat assembly elections however, it won the state election in Himachal Pradesh.

In 2023, UPA again failed in winning elections in the North-East but won the assembly in the very important state of Karnataka.

The alliance was rebranded as the Indian National Developmental Inclusive Alliance on 18 July 2023, with many parties joining the newly-formed alliance. The alliance contested the 2024 Indian general election, serving as the primary opposition to the ruling National Democratic Alliance.

== Former members ==
=== Current members at the time of dissolution ===
Party		Base state
1	Indian National Congress	National Party
2	Dravida Munnetra Kazhagam	Tamil Nadu, Puducherry
4	Shiv Sena (UBT)	Maharashtra, Dadra and Nagar Haveli
5	Nationalist Congress Party	Maharashtra
6	Rashtriya Janata Dal	Bihar, Jharkhand, Kerala
7	Indian Union Muslim League	Kerala
8	Jammu and Kashmir National Conference	Jammu and Kashmir
9	Jharkhand Mukti Morcha	Jharkhand
10	Marumalarchi Dravida Munnetra Kazhagam	Tamil Nadu
11	Revolutionary Socialist Party (India)	Kerala
12	Viduthalai Chiruthaigal Katchi	Tamil Nadu
13	Assam Jatiya Parishad	Assam
14	Goa Forward Party	Goa
15	Kerala Congress	Kerala
16	Revolutionary Marxist Party of India	Kerala
17	Anchalik Gana Morcha	Assam
18	Kerala Congress (Jacob)	Kerala
19	Nationalist Congress Kerala	Kerala
20	Peasants and Workers Party of India	Maharashtra
	Total	India

=== Members left before dissolution ===
Political Party	State	Date	Reason for withdrawal
TRS	Telangana	2006	Differences over proposed statehood for Telangana
BSP	National Party	2008	Congress opposed the UP government where the BSP was the ruling party
JKPDP	Jammu and Kashmir	2009	Congress decided to support National Conference Government in Jammu and Kashmir
PMK	Tamil Nadu	2009	PMK declared that it would join the AIADMK led front
AIMIM	Telangana	2012	Accused Congress led State Government of Communalism
AITC	West Bengal	2012	AITC's demands on rollbacks and reforms not met, including the governments decision to allow FDI in retail and hike in the prices of railway tickets.
SJ(D)	Kerala	2014	It merged with Janata Dal (United) on 29 December 2014.
RLD	Uttar Pradesh	2014	Decided to leave after 2014 election performance.
JD(S)	Karnataka	2019	After JD(S)-INC alliance govt fell in Karnataka, two parties decided to end alliance.
RLSP	Bihar	2020	Withdrawn support before Bihar Assembly Election 2020 & Allied with BSP+ on 29 September 2020.
VIP	Bihar	2020	Withdrawn support before Bihar Assembly Election 2020 & Allied with NDA
KC(M)	Kerala	2020	Decided to join LDF
BPF	Assam	2021	Withdrew due to performance in 2021 Assam election.
AIUDF	Assam	2021	Party was expelled from the alliance.
SS	Maharashtra	2022	Shiv Sena Split in 2022

== Poll performances ==
2004 Lok Sabha Election
Sr.no	Party	Seats Won	Seat Change	Vote%
1.	Indian National Congress	145	▲32	26.7%
2.	Rashtriya Janata Dal	24	▲17	2.2%
3.	Dravida Munnetra Kazhagam	16	▲4	1.8%
4.	Nationalist Congress Party	9	▲1	1.8%
5.	Lok Janshakti Party	4	Steady	0.6%
6.	Telangana Rashtra Samithi	2	Steady	0.6%
7.	Pattali Makkal Katchi	6	▲1	0.5%
8.	Jharkhand Mukti Morcha	5	Steady	0.5%
9.	Marumalarchi Dravida Munnetra Kazhagam	4	Steady	0.4%
10.	Indian Union Muslim League	1	▲1	0.2%
11.	Republican Party of India (Athawale)	1	Steady	0.1%
12.	Jammu and Kashmir Peoples Democratic Party	1	Steady	0.1%
Total		218	▲83	35.4%

2009 Lok Sabha Election
Sr.no	Party	Seats Won	Seat Change
1.	Indian National Congress	206	▲61
2.	Rashtriya Janata Dal	4	▼20
3.	Dravida Munnetra Kazhagam	18	▲2
4.	Nationalist Congress Party	9	▼1
5.	All India Trinamool Congress	19	▲18
6.	Jammu & Kashmir National Conference	3	▲3
7.	Bodoland People's Front	1	▲1
8.	Jharkhand Mukti Morcha		▼3
9.	All India Majlis-e-Ittehadul Muslimeen	1	▲1
10.	Indian Union Muslim League	2	▲1
11.	Kerala Congress (Mani)	1	▲1
Total		262	▲44

== List of presidents ==
Note that it refers to nomination by alliance, as the offices of President and Vice President are apolitical.

=== Presidents ===
No.	Portrait	Name (birth–death)	Term of office Electoral mandates Time in office		Previous post	Vice president	Party
12		Pratibha Patil (b.1934)	25 July 2007	25 July 2012	Governor of Rajasthan	Mohammad Hamid Ansari (2007–12)	Indian National Congress
12		Pratibha Patil (b.1934)	2007		Governor of Rajasthan	Mohammad Hamid Ansari (2007–12)	Indian National Congress
12		Pratibha Patil (b.1934)	5 years, 0 days		Governor of Rajasthan	Mohammad Hamid Ansari (2007–12)	Indian National Congress
13		Pranab Mukherjee (1935–2020)	25 July 2012	25 July 2017	Union Minister of Finance	Mohammad Hamid Ansari (2012–17)	Indian National Congress
13		Pranab Mukherjee (1935–2020)	2012		Union Minister of Finance	Mohammad Hamid Ansari (2012–17)	Indian National Congress
13		Pranab Mukherjee (1935–2020)	5 years, 0 days		Union Minister of Finance	Mohammad Hamid Ansari (2012–17)	Indian National Congress

== List of vice presidents ==
No.	Portrait	Name (birth–death)	Elected (% votes)	Took office	Left office	Term	President(s)	Party
12		Mohammad Hamid Ansari (b.1937)	2007 (67.21)	11 August 2007	10 August 2017	10 years, 0 days	Pratibha Patil	Indian National Congress
12		Mohammad Hamid Ansari (b.1937)	2012 (67.31)	11 August 2007	10 August 2017	10 years, 0 days	Pranab Mukherjee	Indian National Congress

== List of prime ministers ==
List of prime ministers of India
No.	Prime ministers	Portrait	Term in office			Lok Sabha	Government	Cabinet	Constituency
No.	Prime ministers	Portrait	Start	End	Tenure	Lok Sabha	Government	Cabinet	Constituency
13	Manmohan Singh		22 May 2004	26 May 2014	10 years, 4 days	14th	UPA I	Manmohan Singh I	Rajya Sabha MP From Assam
13	Manmohan Singh		22 May 2004	26 May 2014	10 years, 4 days	15th	UPA II	Manmohan Singh II	Rajya Sabha MP From Assam

== Candidates in elections ==
=== Lok Sabha general elections ===
- 2009 Indian general election
- 2014 Indian general election
- 2019 Indian general election

== Electoral performance ==
Election	Seats won	Change	Total votes	Share of votes	Swing	Status	UPA Leader
2009	262 / 543	New	158,305,006	36.66%	New	Government	Manmohan Singh
2014	60 / 543	▼202	130,664,858	23.59%	▼13.07%	Opposition	Sonia Gandhi
2019	91 / 543	▲31	177,645,346	29.00%	▲5.41%	Opposition	Rahul Gandhi

== Controversies ==
The winter session of parliament in October 2008 came under intense criticism from the Left parties and the BJP to demand a full-fledged winter session instead of what was seen as the UPA to having "scuttled the voice of Parliament" by bringing down the sittings to a record low of 30 days in the year. The tensions between the UPA and the opposition parties became evident at an all-party meeting convened by Lok Sabha speaker Somnath Chatterjee when the leader of opposition, L. K. Advani questioned the status, timing and schedule of the current session of parliament.

M. Karunanidhi had said he felt "let down" by the "lukewarm" response of the centre and had demanded amendments in the resolution on Sri Lanka -

- One of the amendments was to "declare that genocide and war crimes had been committed and inflicted on the Sri Lankan Tamils by the Sri Lanka Army and the administrators".
- The second one was "establishment of a credible and independent international commission of investigation in a time-bound manner into the allegations of war crimes, crimes against humanity, violations of international International human rights law, violations of international humanitarian law and crime of genocide against the Tamils". Karunanidhi said Parliament should adopt the resolution incorporating these two amendments.

Between 2005 to 2008 and 2010 to 2013, the UPA faced sustained criticism, due to the failure to prevent several terrorist attacks nationwide. The UPA Government repealed the Prevention of Terrorism Act, 2002 in 2004, which was criticized by then Gujarat chief minister and future prime minister Narendra Modi, as it weakened India’s counterterrorism framework and reduced the powers available to law-enforcement agencies. Subsequently, several terror attacks took place in 2008 across cities like Jaipur, Bangalore, Ahmedabad and Delhi, led by the Indian Mujahideen under support from Pakistan-based ISI, as well as the 2005 Delhi bombings, 2006 Mumbai train bombings and 2006 Varanasi bombings; allies of UPA such as Samajwadi Party were also criticized for labeling the Batla House encounter as fake and supporting the accused arrested by Delhi Police, which occurred less than a week after the Delhi bombings in September 2008.

During the November 2008 terror attacks in Mumbai, when 10 Pakistani terrorists from the banned terror outfit Lashkar-e-Taiba under support from Pakistan Army and ISI, came from the sea route and targeted the city from 26 to 29 November 2008, the UPA Government faced widespread outrage from citizens and leaders of opposition for intelligence failures as well as delay in deploying NSG commandos, who neutralized 8 of the 10 terrorists at the Taj Mahal Palace Hotel, the Oberoi Trident hotel, and the Chabad House. Furthermore, Congress leader Digvijaya Singh, faced heavy criticism for launching a book which mentioned that the Rashtriya Swayamsevak Sangh was somehow linked to the attack, despite credible evidence and confessions from Ajmal Kasab, the only gunman who was captured by Mumbai Police; Singh, along with several other UPA leaders, was also publicly criticized for coining the terms Hindu Terror and Saffron Terror. The 2008 attacks in Mumbai subsequently led to resignation of several leaders like Vilasrao Deshmukh, R. R. Patil and Shivraj Patil, on the grounds of moral responsibility as well as for making insensitive statements in the aftermath. Additionally, the UPA faced condemnation from opposition leaders and commentators for ruling out military action against Pakistan, with critics describing the response as insufficiently strong.

Following the 2011 Mumbai bombings, which claimed 26 lives and injured 130+, UPA leader and INC General Secretary Rahul Gandhi remarked that it was impossible to stop every terror attack, adding that "We work towards defeating it, but it is very difficult to stop all the attacks. Even the United States, they are being attacked in Afghanistan.". His comments were slammed from some quarters of the Indian political spectrum, who criticised him for equating the Mumbai attacks with those in Afghanistan and called it an insult to those killed in the blasts. The ineptness towards national security, the insensitive statements made by Congress leadership following the terror attack, and the inaction against Pakistan sponsored terrorist groups was one of the few factors that led to the UPA suffering a major defeat in the 2014 General elections.

The UPA was criticised for its alleged involvement scams such as the Commonwealth Games Scam of 2010, the 2G spectrum case, the Indian coal allocation scam, and the AgustaWestland VVIP chopper deal. Apart from the above-mentioned scams, the UPA has been under intense fire for the alleged doles handed out to the son-in-law of the Gandhi family, Robert Vadra, by UPA-run state governments. The UPA was also rebuked for shielding and not prosecuting RJD leader and Railway Minister during UPA 1 Lalu Prasad Yadav, for his involvement in several corruption cases, including the fodder scam case as well as creating Jungle Raj in Bihar between 1990 and 2005, which affected economic and social standing of the state. Additionally, the UPA faced serious criticism on mishandling the national carrier Air India, which led to its financial crisis in 2006–07, before being sold to the Tata group in 2022.

The UPA Government has been severely condemned for mishandling the aftermath of the 2012 Delhi gang rape case. As per Firstpost media house, the Government had failed to act positively or give credible assurances to the protesters, and instead used police force and lathi-charging against protesters, while pushing the media out of the scene, and shutting down metro rail stations. In the aftermath of the incident, while the Government passed an amendment of the laws against rape and sexual assault, which ensured stricter punishments for rape convicts, the amendment was criticized and labeled as an eyewash, as the changes in the laws failed to serve as a deterrent to rising incidents of rape. Furthermore, several key suggestions were ignored, including the criminalisation of marital rape and trying military personnel accused of sexual offences under criminal law, which was severely condemned by several women's safety activists. The UPA was also slammed for inaction against political leaders such as Digvijaya Singh and Mulayam Singh Yadav for their comments which promoted misogyny and anti-women views, with Yadav and his party leadership being labeled in 2014 as supporters and defenders of rape and rapists for their comments "Boys are boys, they make mistakes"; Yadav was previously condemned for opposing the Women's Reservation Bill in March 2010 and warning to withdraw from the alliance, making a sexist comment that "if the bill is passed it will fill Parliament with the kind of women who invite catcalls and whistles".

During its tenure between 2004 and 2014, as well as before, the UPA faced widespread condemnation for indulging in appeasement politics for vote-bank of the Muslim community across India. Following the introduction of Muslim Women (Protection of Rights on Marriage) Act, 2019, which criminalized triple talaq or instant divorce and replaced the Muslim Women (Protection of Rights on Divorce) Act 1986, several leaders from the UPA opposed the law. In addition, the UPA faced immense criticism for the formation of the WAQF Board to appease the Muslim community, which has been responsible for land grabbing and forcible acquisition of properties nationwide, while evicting the original owners who possessed legal documents of ownership.

The UPA, in its opposition, faced immense criticism by the NDA Government for banking frauds, mostly by giving unsecured loans to fugitive businessmen Vijay Mallya, Nirav Modi and Mehul Choksi during the tenure of then Prime Minister Manmohan Singh. Mallya owes money to a consortium of 17 banks, from whom he took loan to fund his now closed Kingfisher Airlines, and Modi owes money to the Punjab National Bank. While Mallya and Modi have been apprehended in the Great Britain and awaiting extradition, Choksi acquired citizenship of Antigua and Barbuda, with a warrant against him to extradite to India for the bank fraud.

== See also ==
- Indian National Congress
- Indian National Developmental Inclusive Alliance
- Coalition government
- National Advisory Council
- National Democratic Alliance
- Third Front
