= 2007 Indian presidential election =

Election of Pratibha Patil

- 19 July 2007
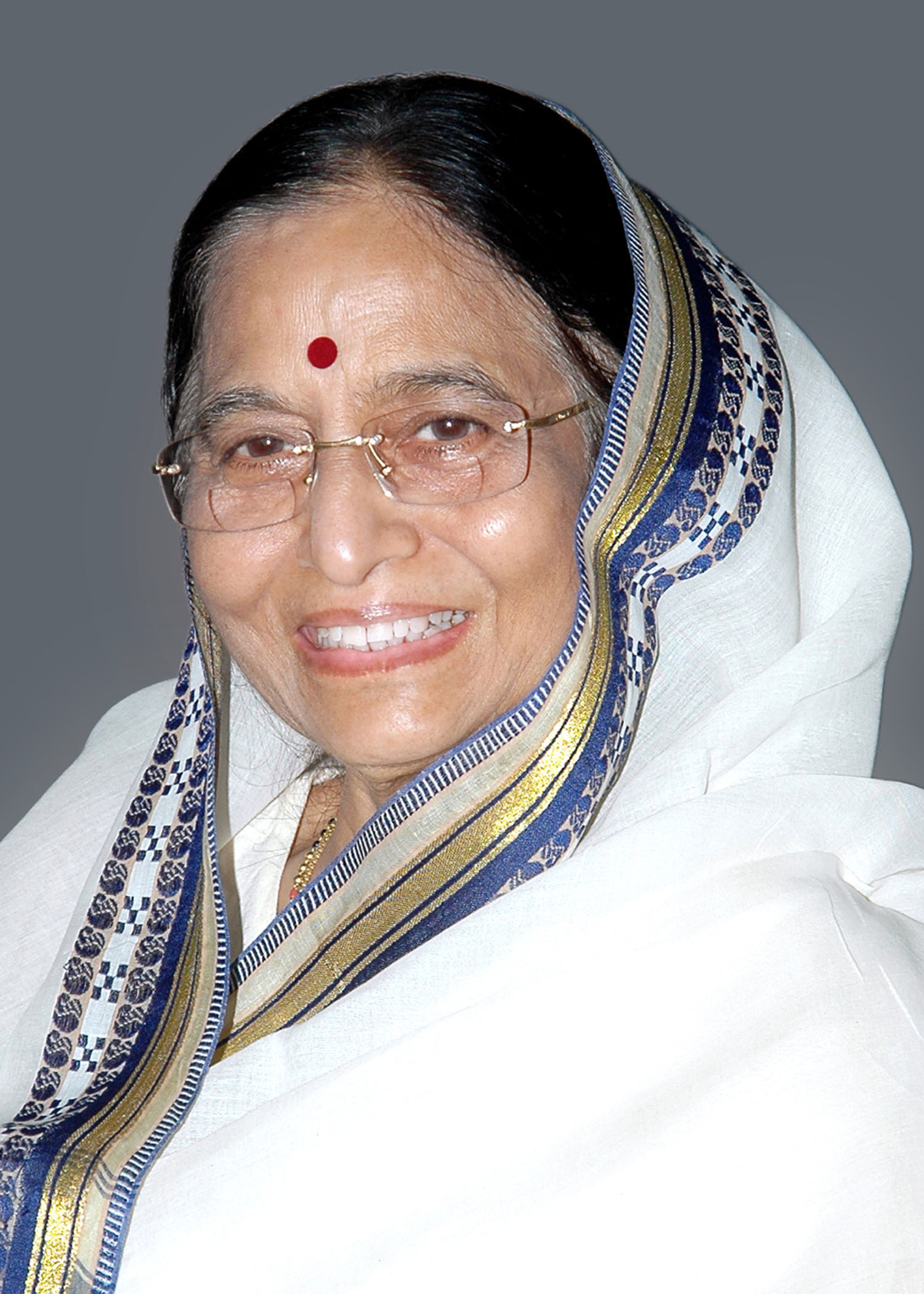

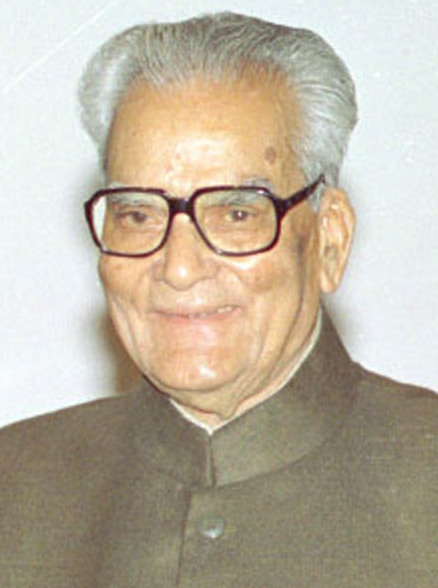
Nominee	Pratibha Patil	Bhairon Singh Shekhawat
Party	INC	BJP
Alliance	UPA	NDA
Home state	Maharashtra	Rajasthan
Electoral vote	638,116	331,306
States carried	21+NCT+PY	7
Percentage	65.8%	34.2%
President before election
A. P. J. Abdul Kalam
Independent
Elected President
Pratibha Patil
INC

The Election Commission of India held indirect 13th presidential elections of India on 19 July 2007 with giving the results on 21 July. Pratibha Patil with 638,116 votes won over her nearest rival Bhairon Singh Shekhawat who got 331,306 votes. This result meant that Pratibha Patil became the first female President of India.

== Candidates ==
=== United Progressive Alliance ===
United Progressive Alliance
For President

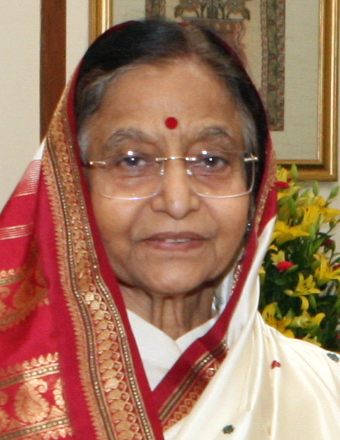

Governor of Rajasthan
Pratibha Patil

Indian National Congress

=== National Democratic Alliance ===
National Democratic Alliance
For President

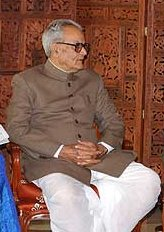

Vice President
Bhairon Singh Shekhawat

Bharatiya Janata Party

On 14 June, Pratibha Patil, the governor of the state of Rajasthan, was declared by UPA as its candidate for the election. The Left and other allies of the United Progressive Alliance (UPA) such as Bahujan Samaj Party (BSP) and Dravida Munnetra Kazhagam (DMK) announced their support on Patil's candidature. Shiv Sena, an ally of the National Democratic Alliance (NDA) also supported Patil's candidature. The move came as a surprise as Patil's name was not mentioned among the probables by UPA so far.

Supported unofficially by the NDA, the then Vice President, Bhairon Singh Shekhawat filed his nomination as an independent candidate on 25 June 2007.

== Process ==
As per the electoral calculation following were the number of votes for respective political parties.

Electoral College (India)

Name of party	Combined value of vote
Indian National Congress	281,015
Bharatiya Janata Party	253,269
Communist Party of India (Marxist)	81,722
Bahujan Samaj Party	62,862
Samajwadi Party	58,403
Rashtriya Janata Dal	32,727
Dravida Munnetra Kazhagam	29,752
Janata Dal (United)	27,057
Nationalist Congress Party	23,788
Shiv Sena	22,178
Biju Janata Dal	19,709
All India Anna Dravida Munnetra Kazhagam	19,280
Communist Party of India	15,130
Telugu Desam Party	14,744
Shiromani Akali Dal	13,356
Janata Dal (Secular)	11,956
Pattali Makkal Katchi	8,156
Trinamool Congress	8,070
Telangana Rashtra Samithi	7,388
All India Forward Bloc	7,365
Jharkhand Mukti Morcha	7,128
Revolutionary Socialist Party	6,360
Rashtriya Lok Dal	4,912
Asom Gana Parishad	4,908
Lok Jan Shakti Party	4,742
Jammu & Kashmir National Conference	4,140
Marumalarchi Dravida Munnetra Kazhagam	3,904
Indian National Lok Dal	2,940
Jammu & Kashmir People's Democratic Party	2,568
Indian Union Muslim League	2,480
Sikkim Democratic Front	1,633
Nagaland People's Front	1,587
Mizo National Front	1,584
Kerala Congress	1,316
All India Majlis-e-Ittehadul Muslimeen	1,300
Assam United Democratic Front	1,160
Communist Party of India (Marxist-Leninist) Liberation	1,041
Republican Party of India (Athvale)	883
Swatantra Bharat Paksh	883
Kerala Congress (Mani)	760
Samata Party	717
Bharatiya Navshakti Party	708
Indian Federal Democratic Party	708
National Loktantrik Party	708
Samajwadi Janata Party (Rashtriya)	708
Jan Surajya Shakti	700
West Bengal Socialist Party	604
Gorkhaland National Liberation Front	453
Rashtriya Parivartan Dal	416
Gondvana Ganatantra Party	393
United Goans Democratic Party	372
All Jharkhand Students Union	352
Viduthalai Chiruthaigal Katchi	352
Peasants and Workers Party of India	350
Orissa Gana Parishad	298
Janata Party	296
Jammu & Kashmir National Panthers Party	288
Rashtriya Samanta Dal	262
Akhil Bharatiya Loktantrik Congress	208
Bharatiya Janshakti Party	208
Jan Morcha	208
Rashtriya Swabhimaan Party	208
Uttar Pradesh United Democratic Front	208
Uttarakhand Kranti Dal	192
Desiya Murpokku Dravida Kazhagam	176
Jharkhand Party	176
Akhil Bharitiya Sena	175
Bharipa Bahujan Mahasangha	175
Akhil Jan Vikas Party	173
Indigenous Nationalist Party of Twipra	156
United Democratic Party	153
Congress (Secular)	152
Democratic Indira Congress (Karunakaran)	152
Indian National League	152
JSS	152
Kerala Congress (Balakrishna)	152
Kerala Congress (Secular)	152
Democratic Socialist Party	151
Jharkhand Party (Naren)	151
Kannada Chalavali Vatal Paksha	131
Kannada Nadu Party	131
Republican Party of India	131
Rajasthan Samajik Nyaya Manch	129
Asom Gana Parishad (Pragatishel)	116
Autonomous State Demand Committee	116
Loko Sanmilon	116
Manipur People's Party	90
Democratic Movement	72
Jammu & Kashmir Awami League	72
Meghalaya Democratic Party	68
National People's Party	54
Himachal Vikas Congress	51
Loktantrik Morcha Himachal Pradesh	51
Nationalist Democratic Movement	45
Pondicherry Munnetra Congress	48
Maharashtrawadi Gomantak Party	40
Save Goa Front	40
Hill State People's Democratic Party	34
Khun Hynniewtrep National Awakening Movement	34
Mizoram People's Conference	24
Arunachal Congress	16
Zoram Nationalist Party	16
Hmar People's Convention	8
Maraland Democratic Front	8
Independents	32,202

Figures are based upon Wayback Machine and Rajya Sabha. Figure on Lok Sabha and Vidhan Sabha seats do not take into consideration splits, mergers, defections, expulsions and by-elections after general elections have been held.

== Know Pratibha Patil ==
Know Pratibha Patil is part of the political campaign launched by the Bharatiya Janata Party (BJP) for the presidential election of 2007. It consists of a website and a PDF booklet (titled "Presidential Election 2007"), created by the BJP under the banner of Project India. Both contain the party's allegation in the form of a compilation of articles from various media. While announcing the website at a press conference, the BJP party general secretary Arun Jaitley also distributed a printed form of the booklet and described it as a compilation of articles / editorials from newspapers on the Presidential contest.

The stated objective of the site is to "educate the people about Pratibha Patil, the nominee of UPA and Indian left for Indian presidential election scheduled on 19 July 2007". To support this, the website consists of various sections like 'Cartoon,' 'Pratibhaspeak' and 'UPA Doublespeak' and includes links to video clippings and articles that refer to the various allegations levelled against Pratibha Patil.

The website declares :

Even though the people do not elect the Rashtrapati, they have a vital stake in the Presidential poll since the winner will become head of the Republic of India. They have a right to know whether the likely winner is worthy of becoming the Head of State of the world's largest democracy. The need to know whether the person embodies, as far as possible, the lofty ideals enshrined in the Constitution of India, of which he or she will be the custodian, or he/she will be a rubber stamp of those who have catapulted him/her to the high Office.

BJP leader Arun Jaitley talking to news-persons called the website a "campaign to provide an informed choice to the electorate (the electoral college)". "The voter has a right to the information about the candidate he is voting for. This effort is intended for an informed choice of the electorate," Jaitley said.

Arun Jaitley did not respond when asked what would happen to the right of information when people are "informed" only about one of the two presidential candidates. He said the website would vanish after 21 July, when the presidential election result will be out.

However, the website can still be viewed via archive.org

An INC spokesperson commented:

The exercise is futile and aimed at denigrating the office of President and maligning an individual.... There is a frustrated section in the BJP, a queer combination of the senile and juvenile that was denigrating institutions.

=== BJP division ===
The Times of India BJP leaders had initially looked divided over supporting this campaign against Pratibha Patil. Party chief Rajnath Singh seemed reluctant to be drawn into a "personal attack" while senior party leader L. K. Advani spoke at length on the "pliant President" issue at the party's national executive last month. Daily News and Analysis also reported on the apparent differences among senior leaders on this campaign and had this quote:

"Rajnath Singh has virtually dissociated himself from all this. Nor has there been any statement so far by former prime minister Atal Bihari Vajpayee attacking Patil," a party functionary said.

== Results ==
	MPs	MLAs	Total
Pratibha Patil	312,936	325,180	638,116
Bhairon Singh Shekhawat	164,256	167,050	331,306

Source: "India gets first woman president". NDTV.com. 21 July 2007. Archived from the original on 17 August 2007.

== See also ==
- 2007 Indian presidential election
