= 1957 Indian vice presidential election =

Vice-presidential election in India

← 1952	11 May 1957	1962 →
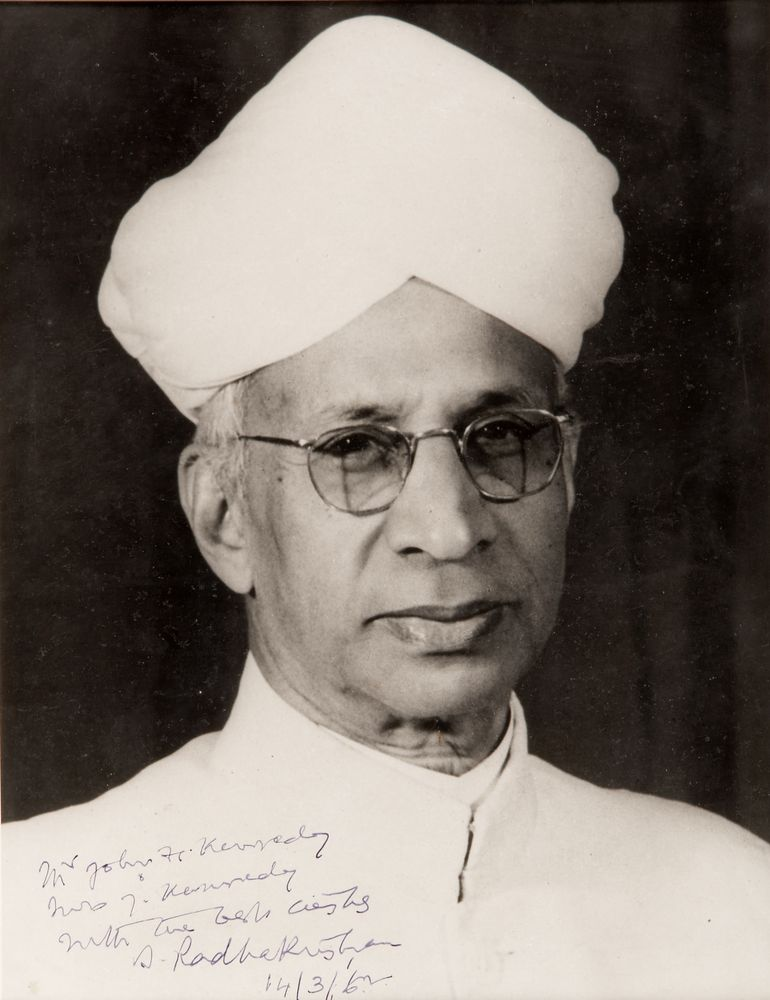
Nominee	Sarvepalli Radhakrishnan
Party	Independent
Home state	Tamil Nadu
Electoral vote	Unopposed
Vice President before election
Sarvepalli Radhakrishnan
Independent
Elected Vice President
Sarvepalli Radhakrishnan
Independent

The 1957 Indian vice presidential election was held in 1957 to elect the vice president of India. Sarvepalli Radhakrishnan was reelected unopposed. Had the election been contested by more than one candidate, the poll would have occurred on 11 May 1957.

== Schedule ==
The election schedule was announced by the Election Commission of India on 9 April 1957.

S.No.	Poll Event	Date
1.	Last Date for filing nomination	18 April 1957
2.	Date for Scrutiny of nomination	20 April 1957
3.	Last Date for Withdrawal of nomination	23 April 1957
4.	Date of Poll	11 May 1957
5.	Date of Counting	NA

== Result ==
The Electoral College consisted of 735 members of Lok Sabha and Rajya Sabha. Dr. Radhakrishnan was the only validly nominated candidate and hence he was declared as elected unopposed, to the office of the Vice-President on 23 April 1957. He started his second term on 13 May 1957.

== See also ==
- 1957 Indian presidential election
