= List of presidents of India =

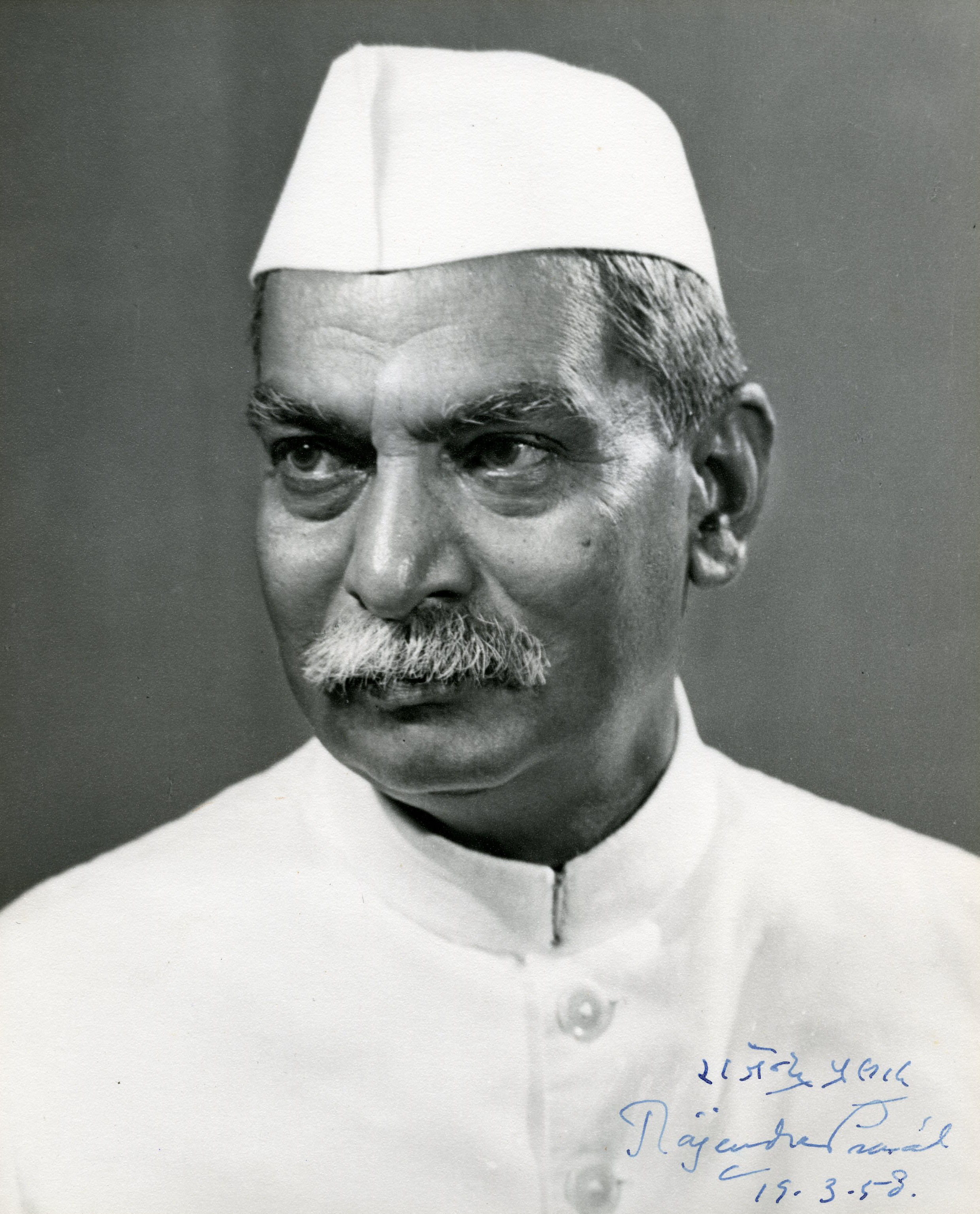
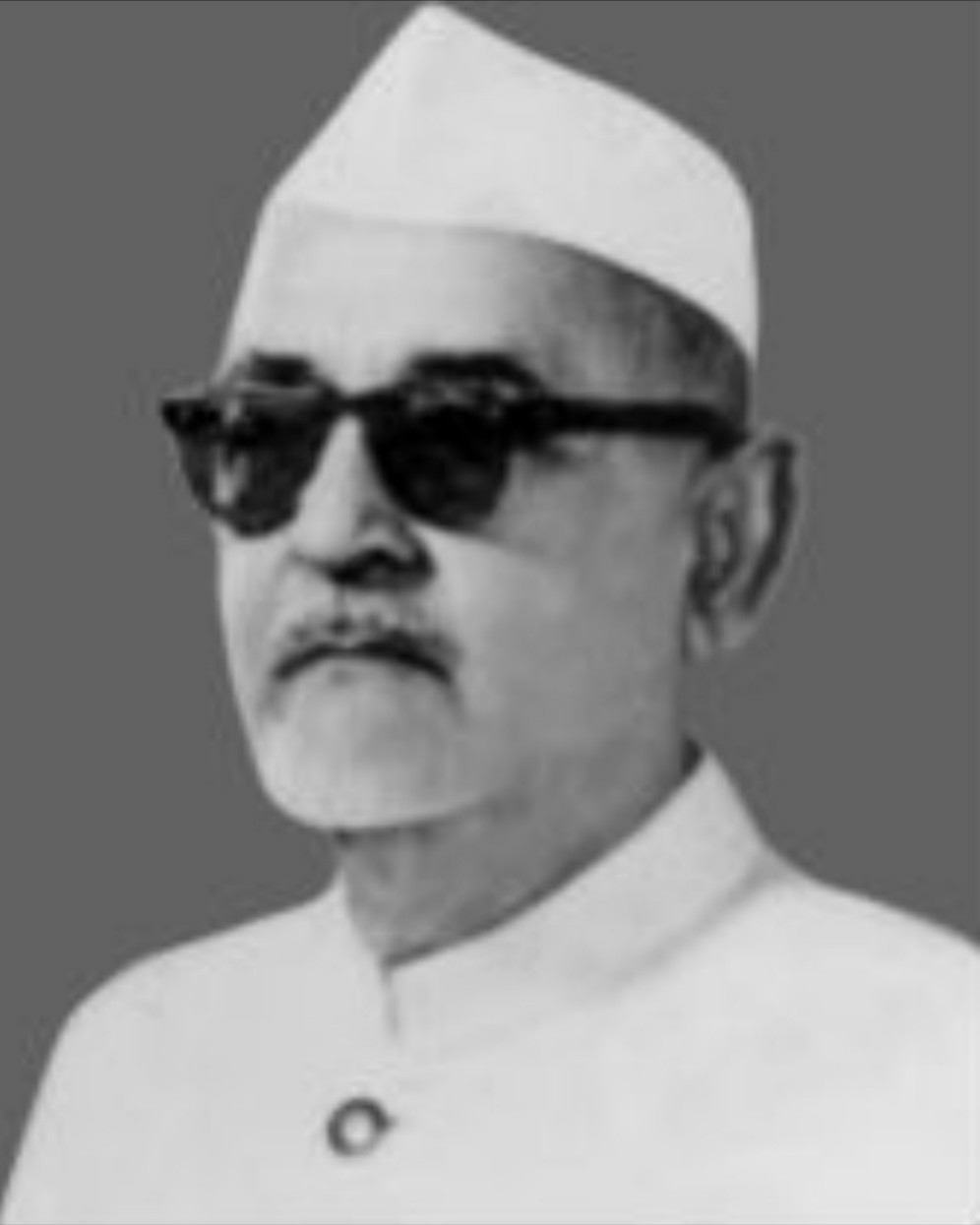
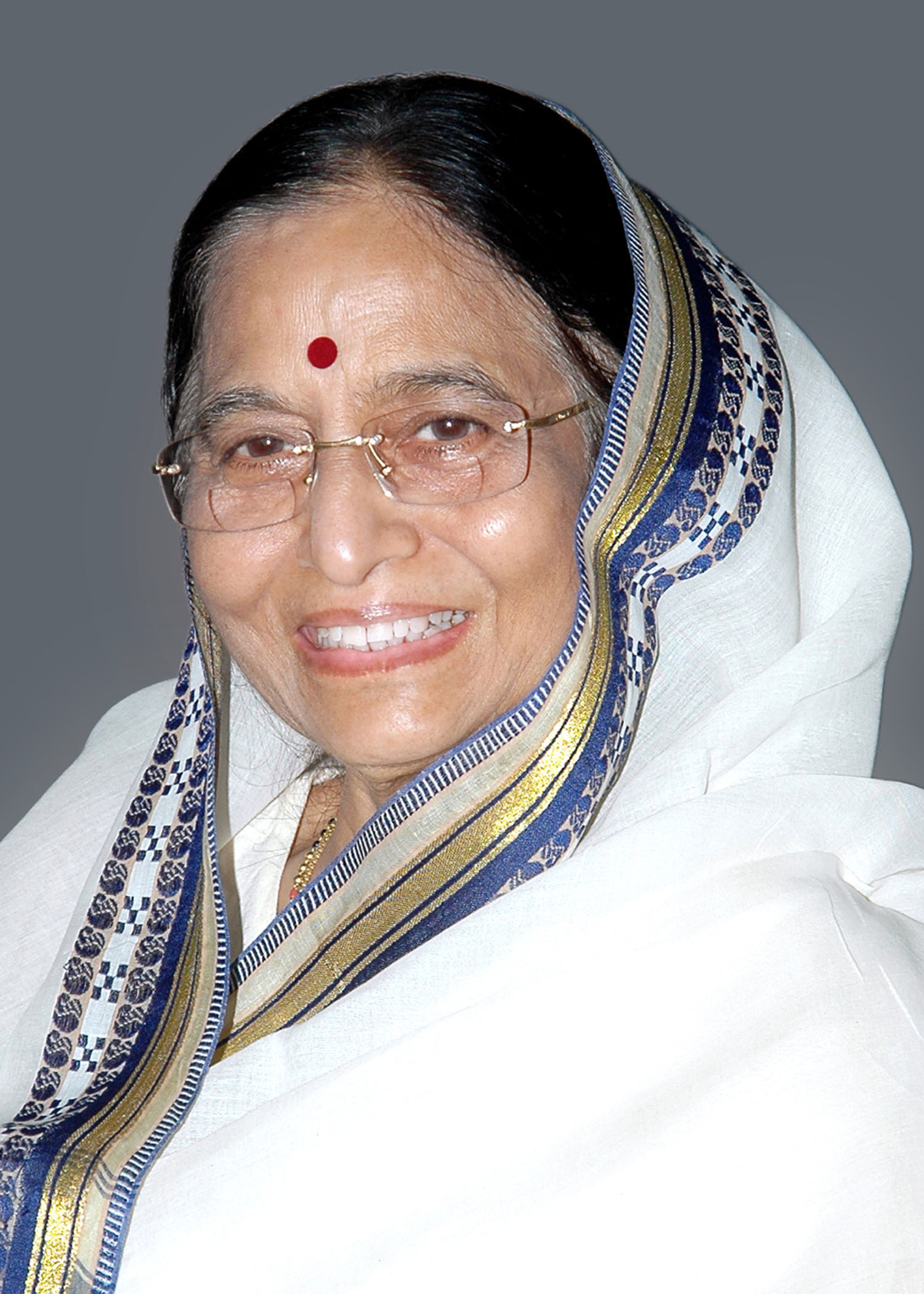
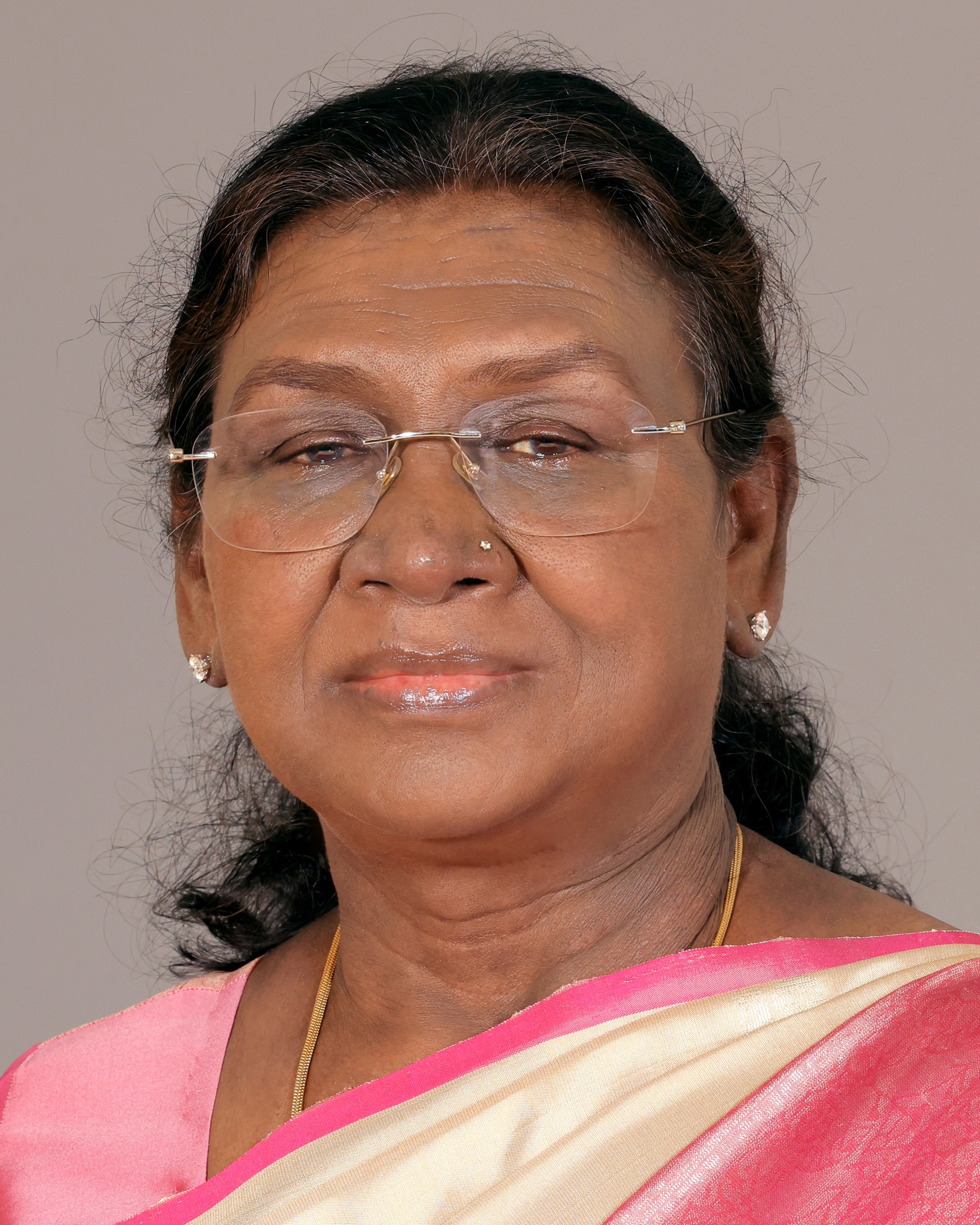
- Top left: Rajendra Prasad was the first and longest-serving president of India.
- Top right: Zakir Husain was the first from a minority religion to become president of India.
- Bottom left: Pratibha Patil was the first female president of India.
- Bottom right: Droupadi Murmu is the current president, the youngest president, and the first president from a tribal community.

The president of India is the head of state of the Republic of India and the supreme commander of the Indian Armed Forces. The president is referred to as the first citizen of India. Although vested with these powers by the Constitution of India, the position is largely a ceremonial one and executive powers are de facto exercised by the prime minister.

The president is elected by the Electoral College composed of elected members of the parliament houses, the Rajya Sabha and the Lok Sabha, and also members of the Vidhan Sabha, the state legislative assemblies. Presidents may remain in office for a tenure of five years, as stated by article 56, part V, of the Constitution of India. In the case where a president's term of office is terminated early or during the absence of the president, the vice president assumes office. By article 70 of part V, the parliament may decide how to discharge the functions of the president where this is not possible, or in any other unexpected contingency.

There have been 15 presidents of India since the post was established when India was declared a republic with the adoption of the Indian constitution in 1950. Apart from these fifteen, three acting presidents have also been in office for short periods of time. V. V. Giri became the acting president in 1969 after Zakir Husain died in office. Giri was elected president a few months later. He remains the only person to have held office both as a president and acting president. Rajendra Prasad, the first president of India, is the only person to have held office for two terms.

Seven presidents have been members of a political party before being elected. Six of these were active party members of the Indian National Congress. The Janata Party has had one member, Neelam Sanjiva Reddy, who later became president. Two presidents, Zakir Husain and Fakhruddin Ali Ahmed, have died in office. Their vice presidents served as acting presidents until a new president was elected. Following Zakir Husain's death, two acting presidents held office until the new president, V. V. Giri, was elected. When Giri resigned to take part in the presidential elections, he was succeeded by Mohammad Hidayatullah as acting president. Pratibha Patil is the first woman to hold the office, elected in 2007.

On 25 July 2022, Droupadi Murmu took office as the president of India, becoming the second woman and the first tribal person to hold the office.

== List of presidents ==
This list is numbered based on presidents elected after winning an Indian presidential election. The terms of V. V. Giri, Mohammad Hidayatullah and B. D. Jatti, who served as acting president, are therefore not numbered or counted as actual terms in office. The president of India does not represent any political party.

Legend

Indian National Congress (INC) (8)
Janata Party (JP) (1)
Bharatiya Janata Party (BJP) (2)
Independent (IND) (4)
Acting President (3)

Key

- ^{RES} Resigned
- ^{†} Assassinated or died in office

Portrait	Name	Term of office			Election	Vice president	Party
Rajendra Prasad	Rajendra Prasad	26 January 1950	13 May 1962	12 years, 107 days	1952	Sarvepalli Radhakrishnan	Indian National Congress
Rajendra Prasad	Rajendra Prasad	26 January 1950	13 May 1962	12 years, 107 days	1957	Sarvepalli Radhakrishnan	Indian National Congress
Sarvepalli Radhakrishnan	Sarvepalli Radhakrishnan	13 May 1962	13 May 1967	5 years, 0 days	1962	Zakir Husain	Independent
	Zakir Husain^{†}	13 May 1967	3 May 1969	1 year, 355 days	1967	V. V. Giri	Independent
	V. V. Giri	3 May 1969	20 July 1969	78 days	–		
	Mohammad Hidayatullah	20 July 1969	24 August 1969	35 days	–		
	V. V. Giri	24 August 1969	24 August 1974	5 years, 0 days	1969	Gopal Swarup Pathak	Independent
	Fakhruddin Ali Ahmed^{†}	24 August 1974	11 February 1977	2 years, 171 days	1974	Gopal Swarup Pathak B. D. Jatti	Indian National Congress (R)
	B. D. Jatti	11 February 1977	25 July 1977	164 days	–		
	Neelam Sanjiva Reddy	25 July 1977	25 July 1982	5 years, 0 days	1977	B. D. Jatti Mohammad Hidayatullah	Janata Party
	Zail Singh	25 July 1982	25 July 1987	5 years, 0 days	1982	Mohammad Hidayatullah Ramaswamy Venkataraman	Indian National Congress (I)
	Ramaswamy Venkataraman	25 July 1987	25 July 1992	5 years, 0 days	1987	Shankar Dayal Sharma	Indian National Congress (I)
Shankar Dayal Sharma	Shankar Dayal Sharma	25 July 1992	25 July 1997	5 years, 0 days	1992	K. R. Narayanan	Indian National Congress (I)
	K. R. Narayanan	25 July 1997	25 July 2002	5 years, 0 days	1997	Krishan Kant	Indian National Congress (I)
Avul Pakir Jainulabdeen Abdul Kalam	A. P. J. Abdul Kalam	25 July 2002	25 July 2007	5 years, 0 days	2002	Krishan Kant Bhairon Singh Shekhawat	Independent
	Pratibha Patil	25 July 2007	25 July 2012	5 years, 0 days	2007	Hamid Ansari	Indian National Congress
	Pranab Mukherjee	25 July 2012	25 July 2017	5 years, 0 days	2012	Hamid Ansari	Indian National Congress
	Ram Nath Kovind	25 July 2017	25 July 2022	5 years, 0 days	2017	Hamid Ansari Venkaiah Naidu	Bharatiya Janata Party
	Droupadi Murmu	25 July 2022	Incumbent	4 years, 77 days	2022	Venkaiah Naidu Jagdeep Dhankhar C. P. Radhakrishnan	Bharatiya Janata Party

== Statistics ==
Representation of presidents by party of candidacy
1. Indian National Congress (53.3%)
2. Independent (26.7%)
3. Bharatiya Janata Party (13.3%)
4. Janata Party (6.67%)

Timeline

== See also ==
- President of India
- Vice President of India
- Prime Minister of India
- Union Council of Ministers
- List of vice presidents of India
- List of prime ministers of India
- List of heads of state and government of Indian origin
