= Electoral system of India =

The electoral system of India relates to regulation of elections to both chambers of the Parliament (the Lok Sabha and the Rajya Sabha), the president and the vice president, and various chambers of state, union territory and local level legislatures. Multiple methods are used to elect members of different chambers and there are different constitutional bodies responsible for the conduct of elections.

Article 326 of the Constitution of India gives right to every citizen above the age of 18 years (amended from 21 years via the 61st constitutional amendment) unless ineligible due to being involved in crime or corrupt practice or being mentally unsound shall have the right to vote in Lok Sabha and state/UT legislative assemblies.

== Conduct of elections ==
=== Election Commission of India ===
Election Commission of India, a constitutional body independent from the government, has the right to conduct elections for the office of the president and the vice president and members of Lok Sabha, Rajya Sabha, state legislative assemblies, state legislative councils and legislative assemblies of the union territories of Jammu and Kashmir, National Capital Territory of Delhi and Puducherry.

=== State Election Commissions ===
Each state in India and four union territories (Chandigarh, Delhi, Puducherry, and Jammu and Kashmir) have an autonomous constitutional body independent from ECI responsible for conducting elections to urban local bodies such as municipal corporations and municipalities, and panchayat institutions such as village panchayats, block panchayats, and district councils within the respective state/UT. It is also responsible for the implementation of a model code of conduct during the election process, and updation of electoral rolls for all elections conducted by it. State Election Commissions were created for implementation of Panchayati Raj system introduced by 73rd constitutional amendment.

=== Election Commission for UTs ===
For all Union Territories without a separate body for conduct of local elections, i.e. the union territories of Andaman and Nicobar Islands, Ladakh, Lakshadweep and Dadra & Nagar Haveli and Daman & Diu, Election Commission for UTs acts as a singular body to conduct elections to autonomous hill councils, municipal corporations,municipalities, village panchayats, block panchayats, and district councils within all of these 4 Union Territories.

== Voter registration ==
A person is eligible to register to vote by registering or after one of the qualifying dates (1 January, 1 April, 1 July or 1 October) such that it is the last qualifying date before they turn 18, though their name will be added on the electoral roll on the next qualifying date if they are an ordinary resident of the constituency they wish to enroll in and is not legally barred from voting. Applications for new registration are made using Form 6.

== Political parties ==
A person may contest election for any office or house either as an independent candidate or as member of a registered political party.

Out of the registered political parties, a party can be recognized as a state party or a national party by ECI which grants them additional benefits on appointing observers, star campaigners, access to ECI meetings, etc.

=== Criteria for recognition ===
==== National party status ====
A registered party is recognised as a national party only if it fulfills any one of the three conditions listed below:

- If its candidates have secured at least 6% of total valid votes in at least four states (in latest Lok Sabha or Assembly elections) and the party has at least four MPs in the last Lok Sabha polls.
- If it has won at least 2% of the total seats in the Lok Sabha from at least three states.
- It is 'recognised' in four or more states.

==== State party status ====
A registered party is recognised as a state party only if it fulfils any one of the five conditions listed below:

- A party should secure at least six per cent of valid votes polled in an election to the state/UT legislative assembly and win at least two seats in that assembly.
- A party should secure at least six per cent of valid votes polled in an election to Lok Sabha and win at least one seat in Lok Sabha.
- A party should win at least three per cent of the total number of seats or any fraction thereof allotted to that state/UT.
- At least one MP for every 25 members or any fraction allotted to the state/UT in the Lok Sabha.
- Under the liberalised criteria, one more clause that it will be eligible for recognition as state party if it secures eight per cent or more of the total valid votes polled in the state.

=== List of recognized political parties ===
==== National parties ====
Recognised national parties
| Party | | Abbr. | Flag | Election symbol | Political position | Ideology | Founded | Leader | Government in states/UTs | | Number of seats | | | |
| Party | | Abbr. | Flag | Election symbol | Political position | Ideology | Founded | Leader | Chief ministers | Ruling coalition (Note: Indicates only if the party is part of the cabinet of the incumbent state/UT government.) | Lok Sabha | Rajya Sabha (Note: Includes 12 members nominated by the president of India.) | State assemblies (Note: Excluding five nominated members in Jammu and Kashmir and three nominated members in Puducherry) | State councils |
|---|---|---|---|---|---|---|---|---|---|---|---|---|---|---|
| Aam Aadmi Party | AAP | | | Centre | Welfarism; Indian nationalism; Populism; Secularism | 26 November 2012 (13 years ago) | Arvind Kejriwal | 1 / 31 | 0 / 31 | 3 / 543 | 3 / 245 | 121 / 4,123 | 0 / 426 | |
| Bahujan Samaj Party | BSP | | | Centre-left | Social justice; Self-respect; Ambedkarism | 14 April 1984 (42 years ago) | Mayawati | 0 / 31 | 0 / 31 | 0 / 543 | 1 / 245 | 4 / 4,123 | 0 / 426 | |
| Bharatiya Janata Party | BJP | | | Right-wing (Note: Attributed to multiple sources) to far-right (Note: Attributed to multiple sources) | Conservatism (Note: Attributed to multiple sources); Neoliberalism (Note: Attributed to multiple sources); Hindutva; Right-wing populism | 6 April 1980 (46 years ago) | Nitin Nabin | 16 / 31 | 5 / 31 | 240 / 543 | 113 / 245 | 1,656 / 4,123 | 165 / 426 | |
| Communist Party of India (Marxist) | CPI(M) | | | Left-wing (Note: Attributed to multiple sources) | Marxism–Leninism Socialism Secularism | 7 November 1964 (61 years ago) | M. A. Baby | 1 / 31 | 0 / 31 | 4 / 543 | 3 / 245 | 79 / 4,123 | 0 / 426 | |
| Indian National Congress | INC | | | Centre | Big tent; Liberalism; Social democracy; Secularism; Civic nationalism | 28 December 1885 (140 years ago) | Mallikarjun Kharge | 3 / 31 | 1 / 31 | 100 / 543 | 29 / 245 | 632 / 4,123 | 60 / 426 | |
| National People's Party | NPP | | | Centre-right | Conservatism; Regionalism | 6 January 2013 (13 years ago) | Conrad Sangma | 1 / 31 | 0 / 31 | 0 / 543 | 1 / 245 | 50 / 4,123 | 0 / 426 | |

==== State parties ====
Recognised state parties (Note: There were 60 state parties listed in publication issued by the Election Commission of India on 23 March 2024. However, two out of 60 parties (Rashtriya Lok Samta Party and People's Democratic Front) have merged with other parties. Additionally, the name and symbol of Lok Janshakti Party and Jammu and Kashmir National Panthers Party have been frozen due to dispute. In January 2025, Janasena Party was recognised as a state party. Naam Tamilar Katchi was recognised as a state party in May 2025.)
| Party | Flag | Election symbol | Founded | Leader(s) | Recognised in state(s)/UT(s) | Government in states/UTs | | Seats | | | |
| Party | Flag | Election symbol | Founded | Leader(s) | Recognised in state(s)/UT(s) | Chief minister | Ruling coalition | Lok Sabha | Rajya Sabha | State assemblies | State councils |
|---|---|---|---|---|---|---|---|---|---|---|---|
State party in three states
| All India Trinamool Congress | | 1998 | Mamata Banerjee | Meghalaya Tripura West Bengal | 1 / 31 | 0 / 31 | 29 / 543 | 13 / 245 | 230 / 4,123 | 0 / 426 | |
| Communist Party of India | | 1925 | D. Raja | Kerala Manipur Tamil Nadu | 0 / 31 | 1 / 31 | 2 / 543 | 2 / 245 | 22 / 4,123 | 1 / 426 | |
| Janata Dal (Secular) | | 1999 | H. D. Deve Gowda H. D. Kumaraswamy | Arunachal Pradesh Karnataka Kerala | 0 / 31 | 0 / 31 | 2 / 543 | 1 / 245 | 18 / 4,123 | 8 / 426 | |
| Janata Dal (United) | | 2003 | Nitish Kumar | Arunachal Pradesh Bihar Manipur | 1 / 31 | 0 / 31 | 12 / 543 | 4 / 245 | 87 / 4,123 | 26 / 426 | |
State party in two states
| All India Anna Dravida Munnetra Kazhagam | Two Leaves | 1972 | Edappadi K. Palaniswami | Puducherry Tamil Nadu | 0 / 31 | 0 / 31 | 0 / 543 | 4 / 245 | 61 / 4,123 | 0 / 426 | |
| Dravida Munnetra Kazhagam | | 1949 | M. K. Stalin | Puducherry Tamil Nadu | 1 / 31 | 0 / 31 | 22 / 543 | 10 / 245 | 137 / 4,123 | 0 / 426 | |
| Naga People's Front | | 1963 | Neiphiu Rio | Manipur Nagaland | 1 / 31 | 0 / 31 | 0 / 543 | 0 / 245 | 39 / 4,123 | 0 / 426 | |
| Nationalist Congress Party | | 1999 | Sunetra Pawar | Maharashtra Nagaland | 0 / 31 | 1 / 31 | 1 / 543 | 3 / 245 | 44 / 4,123 | 8 / 426 | |
| Nationalist Congress Party – Sharadchandra Pawar | | 2024 | Sharad Pawar | Maharashtra Nagaland | 0 / 31 | 0 / 31 | 8 / 543 | 2 / 245 | 12 / 4,123 | 3 / 426 | |
| Rashtriya Janata Dal | | 1997 | Lalu Prasad Yadav Tejashwi Yadav | Bihar Jharkhand | 0 / 31 | 1 / 31 | 4 / 543 | 5 / 245 | 81 / 4,123 | 5 / 426 | |
| Telugu Desam Party | | 1982 | N. Chandrababu Naidu | Andhra Pradesh Telangana | 1 / 31 | 0 / 31 | 16 / 543 | 2 / 245 | 135 / 4,123 | 10 / 426 | |
| YSR Congress Party | | 2011 | Y. S. Jagan Mohan Reddy | Andhra Pradesh Telangana | 0 / 31 | 0 / 31 | 4 / 543 | 7 / 245 | 11 / 4,123 | 35 / 426 | |
State party in one state
| All India Forward Bloc | | 1939 | Debabrata Biswas | West Bengal | 0 / 31 | 0 / 31 | 0 / 543 | 0 / 245 | 0 / 4,123 | 0 / 426 | |
| All India Majlis-e-Ittehadul Muslimeen | kite | 1927 | Asaduddin Owaisi | Telangana | 0 / 31 | 0 / 31 | 1 / 543 | 0 / 245 | 10 / 4,123 | 2 / 426 | |
| All India N.R. Congress | | 2011 | N. Rangaswamy | Puducherry | 1 / 31 | 0 / 31 | 0 / 543 | 0 / 245 | 10 / 4,123 | 0 / 426 | |
| All India United Democratic Front | | 2005 | Badruddin Ajmal | Assam | 0 / 31 | 0 / 31 | 0 / 543 | 0 / 245 | 15 / 4,123 | 0 / 426 | |
| All Jharkhand Students Union | | 1986 | Sudesh Mahto | Jharkhand | 0 / 31 | 0 / 31 | 1 / 543 | 0 / 245 | 1 / 4,123 | 0 / 426 | |
| Apna Dal (Soneylal) | | 2016 | Anupriya Patel | Uttar Pradesh | 0 / 31 | 1 / 31 | 2 / 543 | 0 / 245 | 12 / 4,123 | 1 / 426 | |
| Asom Gana Parishad | | 1985 | Atul Bora | Assam | 0 / 31 | 1 / 31 | 0 / 543 | 1 / 245 | 9 / 4,123 | 0 / 426 | |
| Bharat Rashtra Samithi | | 2001 | K. Chandrashekar Rao | Telangana | 0 / 31 | 0 / 31 | 0 / 543 | 4 / 245 | 39 / 4,123 | 19 / 426 | |
| Biju Janata Dal | | 1997 | Naveen Patnaik | Odisha | 0 / 31 | 0 / 31 | 0 / 543 | 7 / 245 | 51 / 4,123 | 0 / 426 | |
| Bodoland People's Front | | 2005 | Hagrama Mohilary | Assam | 0 / 31 | 1 / 31 | 0 / 543 | 0 / 245 | 3 / 4,123 | 0 / 426 | |
| Communist Party of India (Marxist–Leninist) Liberation | | 1974 | Dipankar Bhattacharya | Bihar | 0 / 31 | 0 / 31 | 2 / 543 | 0 / 245 | 13 / 4,123 | 1 / 426 | |
| Desiya Murpokku Dravida Kazhagam | | 2005 | Premallatha Vijayakant | Tamil Nadu | 0 / 31 | 0 / 31 | 0 / 543 | 0 / 245 | 0 / 4,123 | 0 / 426 | |
| Goa Forward Party | | 2016 | Vijai Sardesai | Goa | 0 / 31 | 0 / 31 | 0 / 543 | 0 / 245 | 1 / 4,123 | 0 / 426 | |
| Hill State People's Democratic Party | | 1968 | KP Pangniang | Meghalaya | 0 / 31 | 1 / 31 | 0 / 543 | 0 / 245 | 2 / 4,123 | 0 / 426 | |
| Indian National Lok Dal | | 1996 | Abhay Singh Chautala | Haryana | 0 / 31 | 0 / 31 | 0 / 543 | 0 / 245 | 2 / 4,123 | 0 / 426 | |
| Indian Union Muslim League | | 1948 | Sadiq Ali Shihab Thangal | Kerala | 0 / 31 | 0 / 31 | 3 / 543 | 2 / 245 | 15 / 4,123 | 0 / 426 | |
| Indigenous People's Front of Tripura | | 2009 | Prem Kumar Reang | Tripura | 0 / 31 | 1 / 31 | 0 / 543 | 0 / 245 | 1 / 4,123 | 0 / 426 | |
| Jammu & Kashmir National Conference | | 1932 | Farooq Abdullah Omar Abdullah | Jammu and Kashmir | 1 / 31 | 0 / 31 | 2 / 543 | 3 / 245 | 42 / 4,123 | 0 / 426 | |
| Jammu and Kashmir National Panthers Party | | 1982 | Harsh Dev Singh | Jammu and Kashmir | 0 / 31 | 0 / 31 | 0 / 543 | 0 / 245 | 0 / 4,123 | 0 / 426 | |
| Jammu and Kashmir Peoples Democratic Party | | 1999 | Mehbooba Mufti | Jammu and Kashmir | 0 / 31 | 0 / 31 | 0 / 543 | 0 / 245 | 3 / 4,123 | 0 / 426 | |
| Janasena Party | | 2014 | Pawan Kalyan | Andhra Pradesh | 0 / 31 | 0 / 31 | 2 / 543 | 0 / 245 | 21 / 4,123 | 2 / 426 | |
| Jannayak Janta Party | | 2018 | Dushyant Chautala | Haryana | 0 / 31 | 0 / 31 | 0 / 543 | 0 / 245 | 0 / 4,123 | 0 / 426 | |
| Janta Congress Chhattisgarh | | 2016 | Renu Jogi | Chhattisgarh | 0 / 31 | 0 / 31 | 0 / 543 | 0 / 245 | 0 / 4,123 | 0 / 426 | |
| Jharkhand Mukti Morcha | | 1972 | Hemant Soren | Jharkhand | 1 / 31 | 0 / 31 | 3 / 543 | 2 / 245 | 34 / 4,123 | 0 / 426 | |
| Kerala Congress | | 1964 | P. J. Joseph | Kerala | 0 / 31 | 0 / 31 | 1 / 543 | 0 / 245 | 0 / 4,123 | 0 / 426 | |
| Kerala Congress (M) | | 1979 | Jose K. Mani | Kerala | 0 / 31 | 1 / 31 | 0 / 543 | 1 / 245 | 5 / 4,123 | 0 / 426 | |
| Lok Janshakti Party | | 2000 | | Bihar | 0 / 31 | 0 / 31 | 0 / 543 | 0 / 245 | 0 / 4,123 | 0 / 426 | |
| Lok Janshakti Party (Ram Vilas) | | 2021 | Chirag Paswan | Nagaland | 0 / 31 | 1 / 31 | 5 / 543 | 0 / 245 | 3 / 4,123 | 0 / 426 | |
| Maharashtra Navnirman Sena | | 2006 | Raj Thackeray | Maharashtra | 0 / 31 | 0 / 31 | 0 / 543 | 0 / 245 | 0 / 4,123 | 0 / 426 | |
| Maharashtrawadi Gomantak Party | | 1963 | Deepak Dhavalikar | Goa | 0 / 31 | 1 / 31 | 0 / 543 | 0 / 245 | 2 / 4,123 | 0 / 426 | |
| Naam Tamilar Katchi | | 1958 | Seeman | Tamil Nadu | 0 / 31 | 0 / 31 | 0 / 543 | 0 / 245 | 0 / 4,123 | 0 / 426 | |
| Mizo National Front | | 1961 | Zoramthanga | Mizoram | 0 / 31 | 0 / 31 | 0 / 543 | 1 / 245 | 10 / 4,123 | 0 / 426 | |
| People's Party of Arunachal | | 1977 | Kamen Ringu | Arunachal Pradesh | 0 / 31 | 0 / 31 | 0 / 543 | 0 / 245 | 1 / 4,123 | 0 / 426 | |
| Rashtriya Loktantrik Party | | 2018 | Hanuman Beniwal | Rajasthan | 0 / 31 | 0 / 31 | 1 / 543 | 0 / 245 | 0 / 4,123 | 0 / 426 | |
| Revolutionary Goans Party | | 2022 | Viresh Borkar | Goa | 0 / 31 | 0 / 31 | 0 / 543 | 0 / 245 | 1 / 4,123 | 0 / 426 | |
| Revolutionary Socialist Party | | 1940 | Manoj Bhattacharya | Kerala | 0 / 31 | 0 / 31 | 1 / 543 | 0 / 245 | 0 / 4,123 | 0 / 426 | |
| Samajwadi Party | | 1992 | Akhilesh Yadav | Uttar Pradesh | 0 / 31 | 0 / 31 | 37 / 543 | 4 / 245 | 112 / 4,123 | 9 / 426 | |
| Shiromani Akali Dal | | 1920 | Sukhbir Singh Badal | Punjab | 0 / 31 | 0 / 31 | 1 / 543 | 0 / 245 | 3 / 4,123 | 0 / 426 | |
| Sikkim Democratic Front | | 1993 | Pawan Kumar Chamling | Sikkim | 0 / 31 | 0 / 31 | 0 / 543 | 0 / 245 | 0 / 4,123 | 0 / 426 | |
| Sikkim Krantikari Morcha | | 2013 | Prem Singh Tamang | Sikkim | 1 / 31 | 0 / 31 | 1 / 543 | 0 / 245 | 32 / 4,123 | 0 / 426 | |
| Shiv Sena | | 2022 | Eknath Shinde | Maharashtra | 0 / 31 | 1 / 31 | 7 / 543 | 1 / 245 | 59 / 4,123 | 8 / 426 | |
| Shiv Sena (UBT) | | 2022 | Uddhav Thackeray | Maharashtra | 0 / 31 | 0 / 31 | 9 / 543 | 2 / 245 | 20 / 4,123 | 6 / 426 | |
| Tipra Motha Party | | 2019 | Pradyot Bikram Manikya Deb Barma | Tripura | 0 / 31 | 1 / 31 | 0 / 543 | 0 / 245 | 13 / 4,123 | 0 / 426 | |
| United Democratic Party | | 1997 | Metbah Lyngdoh | Meghalaya | 0 / 31 | 1 / 31 | 0 / 543 | 0 / 245 | 11 / 4,123 | 0 / 426 | |
| United People's Party Liberal | | 2015 | Urkhao Gwra Brahma | Assam | 0 / 31 | 1 / 31 | 1 / 543 | 1 / 245 | 7 / 4,123 | 0 / 426 | |
| Voice of the People Party | | 2021 | Ardent Miller Basaiawmoit | Meghalaya | 0 / 31 | 0 / 31 | 1 / 543 | 0 / 245 | 4 / 4,123 | 0 / 426 | |
| Zoram Nationalist Party | | 1997 | H. Lalrinmawia | Mizoram | 0 / 31 | 0 / 31 | 0 / 543 | 0 / 245 | 0 / 4,123 | 0 / 426 | |
| Zoram People's Movement | | 2017 | Lalduhoma | Mizoram | 1 / 31 | 0 / 31 | 1 / 543 | 0 / 245 | 27 / 4,123 | 0 / 426 | |

== Date of Elections ==
Though states make law for local elections, ECI is responsible for choosing date of election for all elections within its domain as long as the date of election is within the limitations set by the Representation of the People Act, 1951 and the Presidential And Vice-Presidential Elections Act, 1952

| House/Office | Cause of Vacancy | |
| House/Office | End of Term of House/Member | Casual Vacancy (Death/Resignation/Ineligibility/Suspension) |
|---|---|---|
| President | Before the end of term (Notification of election must be issued no earlier than 60 days of end of term) | Within 6 months of end of term |
| Vice President | Before the end of term (Notification of election must be issued no earlier than 60 days of end of term) | No time limit (As soon as possible) |
| Lok Sabha | Between the day 6 months before end of term and the day before end of term | No later than 6 months (or later if ECI with government consultation find it difficult) [No bye-election takes place if office is vacated less than a year before end of term. |
| State/UT legislative assembly | Between the day 6 months before end of term and the day before end of term | No later than 6 months (or later if ECI with government consultation find it difficult) [No bye-election takes place if office is vacated less than a year before end of term. |
| Rajya Sabha | Before the end of term (Notification of election must be issued no earlier than 3 months of end of term) | No later than 6 months (or later if ECI with government consultation find it difficult) [No bye-election takes place if office is vacated less than a year before end of term. |
| State legislative council | Before the end of term (Notification of election must be issued no earlier than 3 months of end of term) | No later than 6 months (or later if ECI with government consultation find it difficult) [No bye-election takes place if office is vacated less than a year before end of term. |

== Term of Member/House/Office ==
The table below states maximum term of the office or house or its member.

| House/Office | General/Maximum Term | Nature of office/house |
|---|---|---|
| President | 5 years | Dissolvable |
| Vice President | 5 years | Dissolvable |
| Lok Sabha | 5 years | Dissolvable |
| State/UT legislative | 5 years | Dissolvable |
| Rajya Sabha | 6 years (membership) | Permanent/Undisolvable |
| State Legislative Council | 6 years (membership) | Dissolvable by a state's respective legislative assembly |

== Eligibility to vote ==
=== Lok Sabha, state/UT legislative assembly and municipal/panchayat elections ===
==== Elected members ====
Every person in the electoral roll revised by ECI (or state election commission of their respective state of residence for municipal/panchayat elections) before election is eligible to cast one vote in their respective constituency.

Exception: In Sangha assembly constituency in Sikkim Legislative Assembly, only the members of sangha community can contest and vote.

==== Nominated members ====
Two legislative assemblies (Jammu and Kashmir and Puducherry) have nominated members. Government of India is allowed to nominate at-most three members to the Puducherry Legislative Assembly. In Jammu and Kashmir Legislative Assembly, LG can nominate up to two members from Kashmiri migrant families (at least one woman), up to one displaced person from Pakistan occupied Jammu and Kashmir, and up to two additional women if deemed underrepresented.

=== Rajya Sabha elections ===
==== Elected members ====
Every elected member of a state/UT legislative assembly can vote in Rajya Sabha elections in the state of their respective membership. Nominated members are barred from voting in Rajya Sabha elections.

==== Nominated members ====
President of India may nominate up to 12 individuals with special expertise in literature, science, art, or social service to Rajya Sabha, as per Article 80 of the Constitution of India.

=== Presidential elections ===
An electoral collage with unequal number of votes is used for presidential elections. All elected members of Lok Sabha, state legislative assemblies and legislative assemblies of Delhi, Puducherry and Jammu and Kashmir are allowed to vote.

=== Vice Presidential elections ===
All members of Lok Sabha and Rajya Sabha are allowed to vote for Vice Presidential elections. This also includes nominated members of Rajya Sabha.

== Eligibility to contest elections ==
Except constituencies reserved for women, for Scheduled Castes or for Scheduled Tribes, where members of the particular community can contest, the following are the only conditions to contest in an election. For constituencies reserved for a particular community, the following conditions are mandatory in addition to being from teh respective community.

Exception: In Sangha assembly constituency in Sikkim Legislative Assembly, only the eligible members of sangha community can contest and vote.

| Office/House | Minimum age | Minimum number of nominations required | Nominators | Electoral roll requirement | Common requirements |
|---|---|---|---|---|---|
| President | 35 years | 50 electors + 50 distinct seconders | Members of the electoral collage | A registered voter in any parliamentary constituency in India | A citizen of India; Shall not hold an office of profit; Mentally sound; Must not be bankrupt; Must have taken (or to take) oath or affirmation to uphold constitution of India prescribed by a person appointed by ECI; Either never convicted for a crime, or convicted but not jailed for 2 years (or more), or convicted and imprisoned but released 6 years before filing nomination. |
| Vice President | 35 years | 20 proposers + 20 distinct seconders | Members of Lok Sabha or Rajya Sabha | A registered voter in any parliamentary constituency in India | A citizen of India; Shall not hold an office of profit; Mentally sound; Must not be bankrupt; Must have taken (or to take) oath or affirmation to uphold constitution of India prescribed by a person appointed by ECI; Either never convicted for a crime, or convicted but not jailed for 2 years (or more), or convicted and imprisoned but released 6 years before filing nomination. |
| Lok Sabha | 25 years | 1 (if set up by national/state party) 10 (otherwise) | Voters from the respective parliamentary constituency | A registered voter in any parliamentary constituency in India | A citizen of India; Shall not hold an office of profit; Mentally sound; Must not be bankrupt; Must have taken (or to take) oath or affirmation to uphold constitution of India prescribed by a person appointed by ECI; Either never convicted for a crime, or convicted but not jailed for 2 years (or more), or convicted and imprisoned but released 6 years before filing nomination. |
| Rajya Sabha | 30 years | 10% of legislative assembly membership or 10, whichever is less | Members of the state/UT legislative assembly | A registered voter in any parliamentary constituency in India | A citizen of India; Shall not hold an office of profit; Mentally sound; Must not be bankrupt; Must have taken (or to take) oath or affirmation to uphold constitution of India prescribed by a person appointed by ECI; Either never convicted for a crime, or convicted but not jailed for 2 years (or more), or convicted and imprisoned but released 6 years before filing nomination. |
| State/UT legislative assembly | 25 years | 1 (if set up by national/state party) 10 (otherwise) | Voters from the respective assembly constituency | A registered voter in any assembly constituency in the respective state | A citizen of India; Shall not hold an office of profit; Mentally sound; Must not be bankrupt; Must have taken (or to take) oath or affirmation to uphold constitution of India prescribed by a person appointed by ECI; Either never convicted for a crime, or convicted but not jailed for 2 years (or more), or convicted and imprisoned but released 6 years before filing nomination. |
| State legislative council | 30 years | 10 electors | Elector in the respective elector group (Teacher/Graduate/Local Authority/MLA) | Elector in the respective elector group (for non MLA seats) Voter in any assembly constituency in the respective state | A citizen of India; Shall not hold an office of profit; Mentally sound; Must not be bankrupt; Must have taken (or to take) oath or affirmation to uphold constitution of India prescribed by a person appointed by ECI; Either never convicted for a crime, or convicted but not jailed for 2 years (or more), or convicted and imprisoned but released 6 years before filing nomination. |

== System of voting ==
=== Lok Sabha and state/UT legislative assembly ===
All elections for members of Lok Sabha and state or union territory legislative assemblies are conducted using first past the post system. Voters are given a list of candidates in the electronic voting machine with candidates arranged in such a way that candidates set up by national party appear in alphabetical order above those set up by state parties in alphabetical order, which appear above those by registered unrecognised parties in alphabetical order above all independent candidates in alphabetical order, all followed by None of the above option. Name of candidates appears in machine in Hindi, English and local languages (if any) along with their coloured photograph and a symbol chosen by (or reserved for) their respective political party (for candidates set up by a party) or a symbol preferred by the candidate out of the options given to them.

Except for polling booths with single voters, votes are generally anonymous.

Postal ballot option is available for public workers or those working for the Indian government if it is not possible for them to vote. ECI may use postal ballot for home voting of deemed necessary.

As in first past the post, the person with most votes win and a draw of lots is used in case of tie. Irrespective of the number of votes cast to NOTA, NOTA cannot be declared winner and the person with most votes win

=== Rajya Sabha elections ===
By means of single transferable vote through proportional representation, elections for members of Rajya Sabha is held in state/UT legislative assemblies for staggered terms lasting six years each. Members of state legislative assembly must show their ballot to an official set up by their respective political parties if required by a political party. Votes cast by a person are anonymous to all others except the party official. The none of the above option is not available in these polls and paper ballot is used.

=== Municipal and Panchayat elections ===
Though there is no legal requirement to conducted local elections using first past the post system, all states and union territories at all local levels use the first past the post system with almost no change from nationally used method except the NOTA system. In Haryana, Maharashtra and Delhi, if NOTA wins more votes than any other candidate, no candidate is declared winner and elections on every such constituency are held again. Use of EVM or paper ballot is decided by the laws of the state, though all states except Karnataka (which uses ballot papers) use EVMs.

=== State Legislative Council elections ===
Only six out of 28 states in India have bicameral legislature. Upper house of those state is a state legislative council. One third of the members are elected by members of local authorities, one third by MLAs, one twelfth by teachers who had spent at least three years in teaching in educational institutions within the state not lower than Secondary schools, one twelfth by graduates of three years' standing residing in that state. No elections are contested for the remaining one sigxth seats as they are nominated by the governor from persons having knowledge or practical experience in fields such as literature, science, arts, the co-operative movement and social services. Elections to these seats are conducted the same way as Rajya Sabha elections except that only MLA's constituencies can have an official set up by their respective political parties to view ballot of the voters from the respective parties.

=== Presidential elections ===
Presidential elections are conducted though a complex method where combined value of vote of a state is decided in proportion to its population and a single vote is cast for entire value though a ranked choice voting system in an anonymous ballot. The electoral collage consists of all elected members of Lok Sabha, Rajya Sabha and state/UT legislative assemblies. Population of a state/UT for its value of vote is used as per 1971 census. The votes are completely anonymous and are generally cast in central house of Parliament by MPs and the state/UT legislative assemblies by the respective MLAs. No political party can issue a whip to direct any of its MPs or MLAs on ranking any candidate.

$\mbox{Value of an MLA vote} = \lfloor \cfrac {\mbox{Total population of the state or union territory}} {\mbox{Total number of elected members of the State Legislative Assembly} \times {1000}} \rceil$$\mbox{Value of an MP vote} = \lfloor\cfrac {\mbox{The sum of vote value of elected members of all the State Legislative Assemblies}} {\mbox{The sum of elected members of both the houses of Parliament}}\rceil$

=== Vice Presidential elections ===
Vice presidential elections follow a ranked choice voting system in an anonymous ballot just like in Presidential elections but unlike presidential elections, value of vote of all electors is equal. Voting and counting of votes is held in the parliament itself and no political party can issue a whip to direct any of its MPs or MLAs on ranking any candidate.
