= List of Indian vice presidential elections =

Indian vice presidential polls

The vice president of India is elected indirectly, by an electoral college consisting of members (elected as well as nominated) of both Houses of Parliament, by the system of proportional representation using single transferable votes and the voting is by secret ballot. The election of the vice president is slightly different from the election of the president as the members of state legislatures are not part of the electoral college but the nominated members of Rajya Sabha are part of it.

== Electoral college results ==
Year	Party	Alliance	Vice Presidential candidate		Electoral votes		Result
Year	Party	Alliance	Portrait	Name	Votes	%	Result
1952	Independent	–		Sarvepalli Radhakrishnan	Unopposed		Won
1957	Independent	–		Sarvepalli Radhakrishnan	Unopposed		Won
1962	Independent	–		Zakir Husain	568	97.59%	Won
1962	Independent	–		N. C. Samantsinhar	14	2.41%	Lost
1967	Independent	–		V. V. Giri	483	71.45%	Won
1967	Independent	–		Mohammad Habib	193	28.55%	Lost
1969	Independent	–		Gopal Swarup Pathak	Unopposed		Won
1974	Indian National Congress	–		B. D. Jatti	521	78.70%	Won
1974	Jharkhand Party	–		Niral Enem Horo	141	21.30%	Lost
1979	Independent	–		Mohammad Hidayatullah	Unopposed		Won
1984	Indian National Congress	–		Ramaswamy Venkataraman	508	71.05%	Won
1984	Republican Party of India (Kamble)	–		B. C. Kamble	207	28.95%	Lost
1987	Indian National Congress	–		Shankar Dayal Sharma	Unopposed		Won
1992	Indian National Congress	–		K. R. Narayanan	700	99.86%	Won
1992	Independent	–		Joginder Singh	1	0.14%	Lost
1997	Janata Dal	UF		Krishan Kant	441	61.76%	Won
1997	Shiromani Akali Dal	–		Surjit Singh Barnala	273	38.24%	Lost
2002	Bharatiya Janata Party	NDA		Bhairon Singh Shekhawat	454	59.82%	Won
2002	Indian National Congress	–		Sushilkumar Shinde	305	40.18%	Lost
2007	Indian National Congress	UPA		Mohammad Hamid Ansari	455	60.50%	Won
2007	Bharatiya Janata Party	NDA		Najma Heptulla	222	29.52%	Lost
2012	Indian National Congress	UPA		Mohammad Hamid Ansari	490	67.31%	Won
2012	Bharatiya Janata Party	NDA		Jaswant Singh	238	32.69%	Lost
2017	Bharatiya Janata Party	NDA		Venkaiah Naidu	516	67.89%	Won
2017	Independent	UPA		Gopalkrishna Gandhi	244	32.11%	Lost
2022	Bharatiya Janata Party	NDA		Jagdeep Dhankhar	528	74.37%	Won
2022	Indian National Congress	UO		Margaret Alva	182	25.63%	Lost
2025	Bharatiya Janata Party	NDA		C. P. Radhakrishnan	452	60.10%	Won
2025	Independent	INDIA		B. Sudershan Reddy	300	39.90%	Lost

== See also ==
- Elections in India
- Electoral College
- List of Indian presidential elections
- List of Rajya Sabha elections
- List of Indian general elections
- List of Indian state legislative assembly elections
