= Presidency of Droupadi Murmu =

Indian presidential administration from 2022

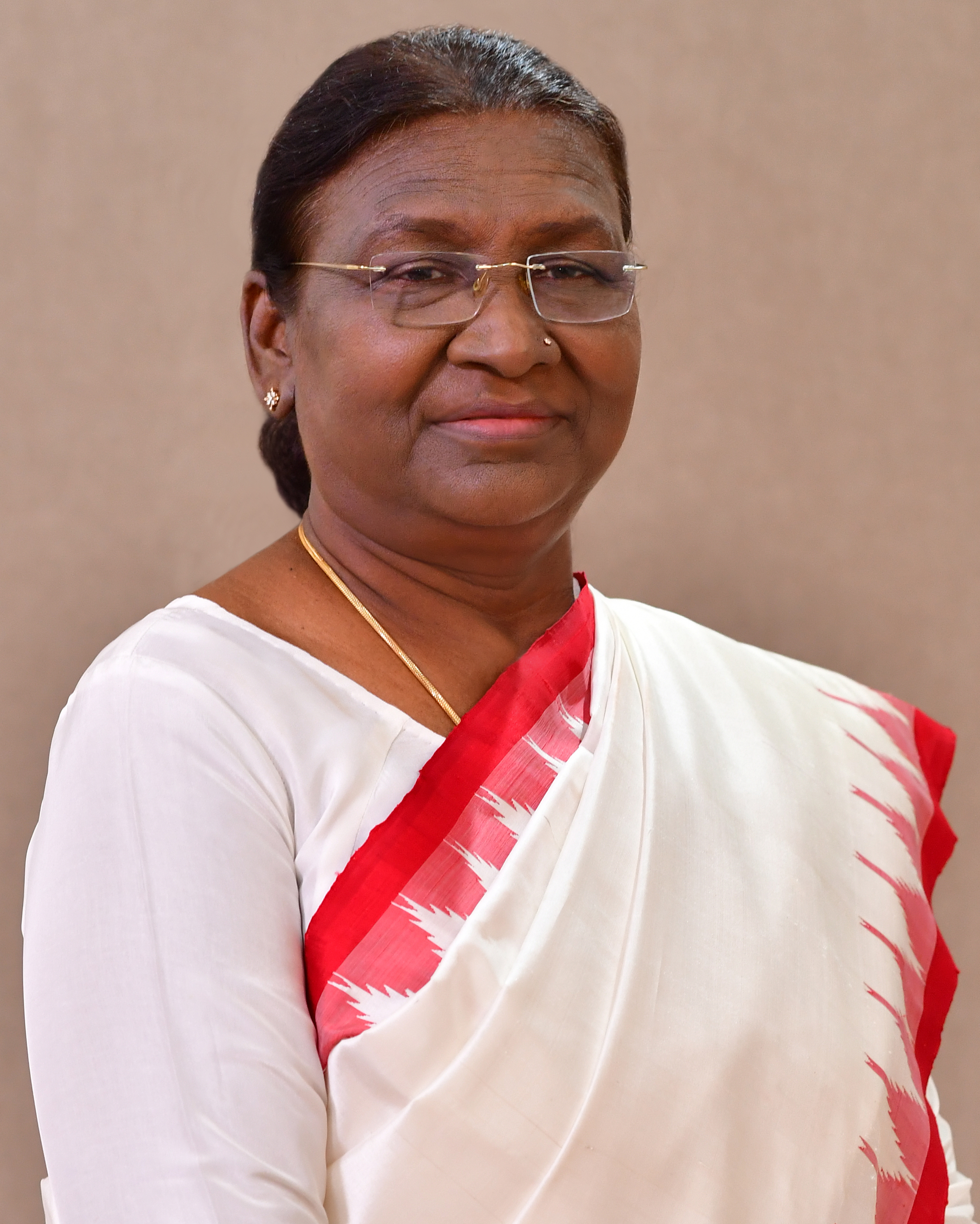
- Presidency of Droupadi Murmu; 25 July 2022 – Incumbent
- President: Droupadi Murmu
- Party: Bharatiya Janata Party
- Election: 2022 Indian presidential election
- Seat: Rashtrapati Bhawan
- Emblem of India

The presidency of Droupadi Murmu began on 25 July 2022, after she took the oath as the 15th President of India, administered by Chief Justice N. V. Ramana. She was the Bharatiya Janata Party (BJP)-led National Democratic Alliance (NDA) nominee and defeated the United Opposition nominee and former Minister of Finance, Yashwant Sinha. Prior to being the presidential nominee, she was the Governor of Jharkhand and a minister in Odisha Government.

== Presidential election of 2022 ==
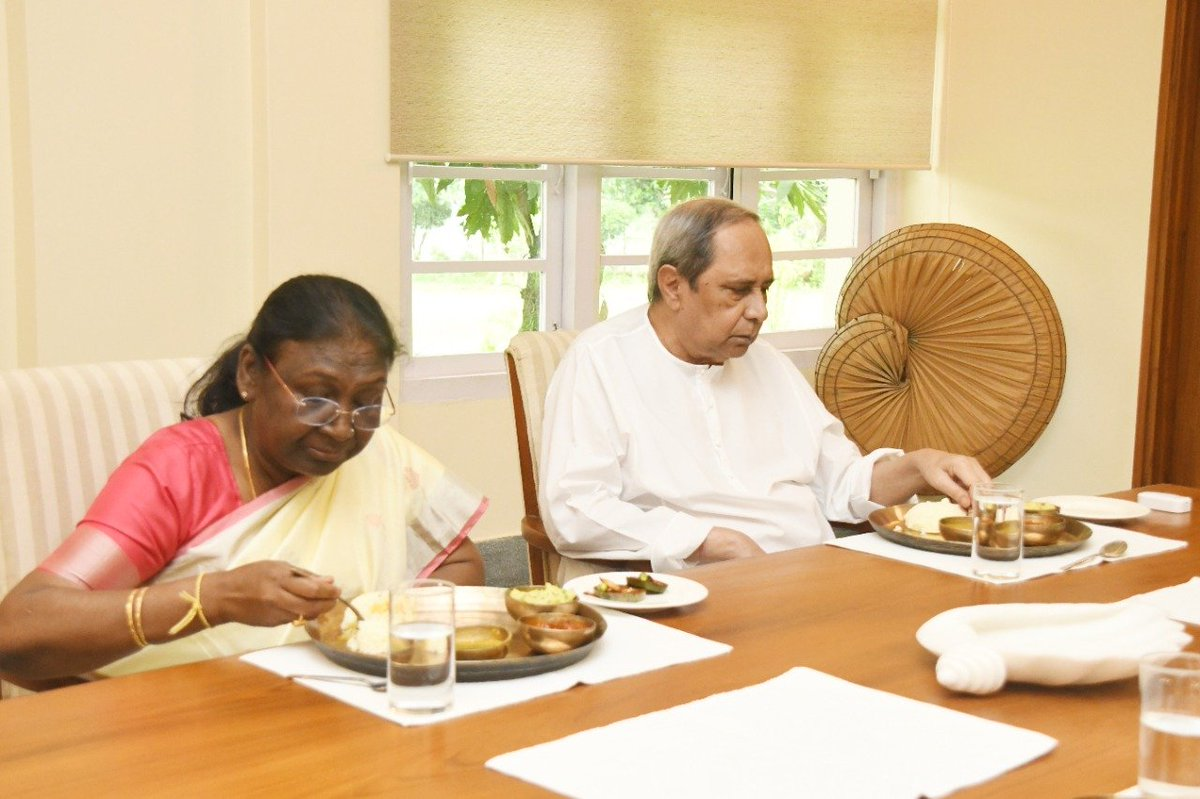
Murmu with Naveen Patnaik in Odisha in 2022 during the campaign

In June 2022, the BJP nominated Murmu as the National Democratic Alliance's candidate for President of India for the 2022 election.

Murmu visited various states as part of the campaign around the country seeking support for her candidature, from BJP lawmakers and other opposition parties. She visited NE states, the JMM party of Jharkhand, BJD of Odisha, Shiv Sena of Maharashta, BSP of Uttar Pradesh, JDS of Karnataka and many others were some of the prominent opposition parties that extended their support to her.

== Oaths administered ==
The following officials and office-holders were administered the oath of office by President Droupadi Murmu:

Oaths Administered by President Droupadi Murmu
Date	Name	Office	Reference
3 August 2022	Suresh N. Patel	Central Vigilance Commissioner	
11 August 2022	Jagdeep Dhankhar	14th Vice President of India	
27 August 2022	Uday Umesh Lalit	49th Chief Justice of India	
9 November 2022	Dhananjaya Y. Chandrachud	50th Chief Justice of India	
29 May 2023	Praveen Kumar Srivastava	Central Vigilance Commissioner	
9 June 2024	Narendra Modi	Prime Minister of India (third term)	
9 June 2024	Union Council of ministers	Union Council of ministers	
11 November 2024	Sanjiv Khanna	51st Chief Justice of India	
21 November 2024	Sanjay K Murthy	Comptroller and Auditor General of India	
14 May 2025	Bhushan Ramkrishna Gavai	52nd Chief Justice of India	
12 September 2025	C. P. Radhakrishnan	15th Vice President of India	
24 November 2025	Surya Kant	53rd Chief Justice of India	

== State visits hosted ==
Official State Visits Hosted by President Droupadi Murmu
#	Year	Date(s)	Visiting country	Visiting dignitary(s)	Notes
1	2023	24–26 January	Egypt	President Abdel Fattah el-Sisi	Chief Guest for India’s 74th Republic Day celebrations. Marked the first Republic Day Chief Guest from Egypt.
2	2023	29–31 May	Cambodia	King Norodom Sihamoni	Strengthened cultural and historical ties between India and Cambodia.
3	2023	9–11 September	Saudi Arabia	Crown Prince and Prime Minister Mohammed bin Salman	Participated in bilateral talks and attended the G20 Summit hosted in New Delhi.
4	2023	8–10 October	Tanzania	President Samia Suluhu Hassan	Discussions focused on trade, education, and defense cooperation.
5	2023	4–6 December	Kenya	President William Ruto	Deliberations on agriculture, digital economy, and renewable energy.
6	2023	16 December	Oman	Sultan Haitham bin Tariq	First visit of an Omani Sultan in over a decade; talks on maritime and energy collaboration.
7	2024	25–26 January	France	President Emmanuel Macron	Chief Guest for India’s 75th Republic Day celebrations; focused on defense and space cooperation.
8	2024	6–10 October	Maldives	President Mohamed Muizzu and First Lady Sajidha Mohamed	Bilateral talks on regional cooperation, security, and climate resilience.
9	2024	15–17 December	Sri Lanka	President Anura Kumara Dissanayake	First foreign visit after assuming office. Strengthened cultural and economic ties.
10	2025	14–18 January	Singapore	President Tharman Shanmugaratnam and First Lady Jane Yumiko Ittogi	Engagements focused on fintech, smart cities, and higher education partnerships.
11	2025	23–26 January	Indonesia	President Prabowo Subianto	Chief Guest for India’s 76th Republic Day; talks on defense and ASEAN collaboration.
12	2025	7–8 April	Portugal	President Marcelo Rebelo de Sousa	Marked 50 years of diplomatic ties; emphasized renewable energy and education.
13	2025	9–10 April	Slovakia	President Peter Pellegrini	First Indian presidential visit to Slovakia in 29 years; explored opportunities in innovation, pharma, and education.

== See also ==
- Premiership of Narendra Modi
