= List of Indian presidential elections =

The election of the President of India is an indirect election in which an electoral college consisting of the elected members of both houses of parliament (M.P.s), the elected members of the state legislative assemblies (Vidhan Sabhas) of all states and the elected members of the legislative assemblies (MLAs) of union territories with legislatures, i.e., National Capital Territory (NCT) of Delhi, Jammu and Kashmir, and Puducherry elect the president. The election process of the president is a more extensive process than of the prime minister who is also elected indirectly (not elected by people directly) by the Lok Sabha members only. Whereas President being the constitutional head with duties to protect, defend and preserve the constitution and rule of law in a constitutional democracy with constitutional supremacy, is elected in an extensive manner by the members of Lok Sabha, Rajya Sabha and state legislative assemblies in a secret ballot procedure.

== Electoral college results ==
| Year | Party | Alliance | Presidential candidate | | Electoral votes | | States Carried | Result |
| Year | Party | Alliance | Portrait | Name | Votes | % | | Result |
|---|---|---|---|---|---|---|---|---|
| 1950 | Indian National Congress | – | | Rajendra Prasad | Unopposed | | 20 | Won |
| 1952 | Indian National Congress | – | | Rajendra Prasad | 507,400 | 83.81% | 20 | Won |
| 1952 | Independent | – | | K. T. Shah | 92,827 | 15.33% | 0 | Lost |
| 1957 | Indian National Congress | – | | Rajendra Prasad | 459,698 | 98.99% | 20 | Won |
| 1957 | Independent | – | | Chaudhary Hari Ram | 2,672 | 0.43% | 0 | Lost |
| 1962 | Independent | – | | Sarvepalli Radhakrishnan | 553,067 | 98.2% | 25 | Won |
| 1962 | Independent | – | | Chaudhary Hari Ram | 6,341 | 1.1% | 0 | Lost |
| 1967 | Independent | – | | Zakir Husain | 471,244 | 56.2% | 21 | Won |
| 1967 | Independent | – | | Koka Subba Rao | 363,971 | 43.4% | 5 | Lost |
| 1969 | Independent | – | | V. V. Giri | 420,077 | 50.9% | 21 | Won |
| 1969 | Independent | – | | Neelam Sanjiva Reddy | 405,427 | 49.1% | 7 | Lost |
| 1974 | Indian National Congress | – | | Fakhruddin Ali Ahmed | 754,113 | 79.9% | 26 | Won |
| 1974 | Revolutionary Socialist Party | – | | Tridib Chaudhuri | 189,196 | 20.1% | 2 | Lost |
| 1977 | Janata Party | – | | Neelam Sanjiva Reddy | Unopposed | | 28 | Won |
| 1982 | Indian National Congress | – | | Zail Singh | 754,113 | 72.7% | 26 | Won |
| 1982 | Independent | – | | Hans Raj Khanna | 282,685 | 27.3% | 2 | Lost |
| 1987 | Indian National Congress | – | | Ramaswamy Venkataraman | 740,148 | 72.3% | 27 | Won |
| 1987 | Independent | – | | V. R. Krishna Iyer | 281,550 | 27.5% | 4 | Lost |
| 1992 | Indian National Congress | – | | Shankar Dayal Sharma | 675,864 | 65.9% | 25 | Won |
| 1992 | Independent | – | | George Gilbert Swell | 346,485 | 33.8% | 6 | Lost |
| 1997 | Indian National Congress | – | | K. R. Narayanan | 956,290 | 95.0% | 31 | Won |
| 1997 | Independent | – | | T. N. Seshan | 50,631 | 5.0% | 0 | Lost |
| 2002 | Independent | NDA | | A. P. J. Abdul Kalam | 922,884 | 89.6% | 28 | Won |
| 2002 | Communist Party of India (Marxist) | LF | | Lakshmi Sahgal | 107,366 | 10.4% | 2 | Lost |
| 2007 | Indian National Congress | UPA | | Pratibha Patil | 638,116 | 65.8% | 23 | Won |
| 2007 | Bharatiya Janata Party | NDA | | Bhairon Singh Shekhawat | 331,306 | 34.2% | 7 | Lost |
| 2012 | Indian National Congress | UPA | | Pranab Mukherjee | 713,763 | 69.3% | 22 | Won |
| 2012 | National People's Party | NDA | | P. A. Sangma | 315,987 | 30.7% | 8 | Lost |
| 2017 | Bharatiya Janata Party | NDA | | Ram Nath Kovind | 702,044 | 65.65% | 21 | Won |
| 2017 | Indian National Congress | UPA | | Meira Kumar | 367,314 | 34.35% | 10 | Lost |
| 2022 | Bharatiya Janata Party | NDA | | Droupadi Murmu | 676,803 | 64.03% | 22 | Won |
| 2022 | Trinamool Congress | UO | | Yashwant Sinha | 380,177 | 35.97% | 8 | Lost |
