= 2017 Indian presidential election =

Election of Ram Nath Kovind

- 17 July 2017
- Turnout: 97.29% ▲
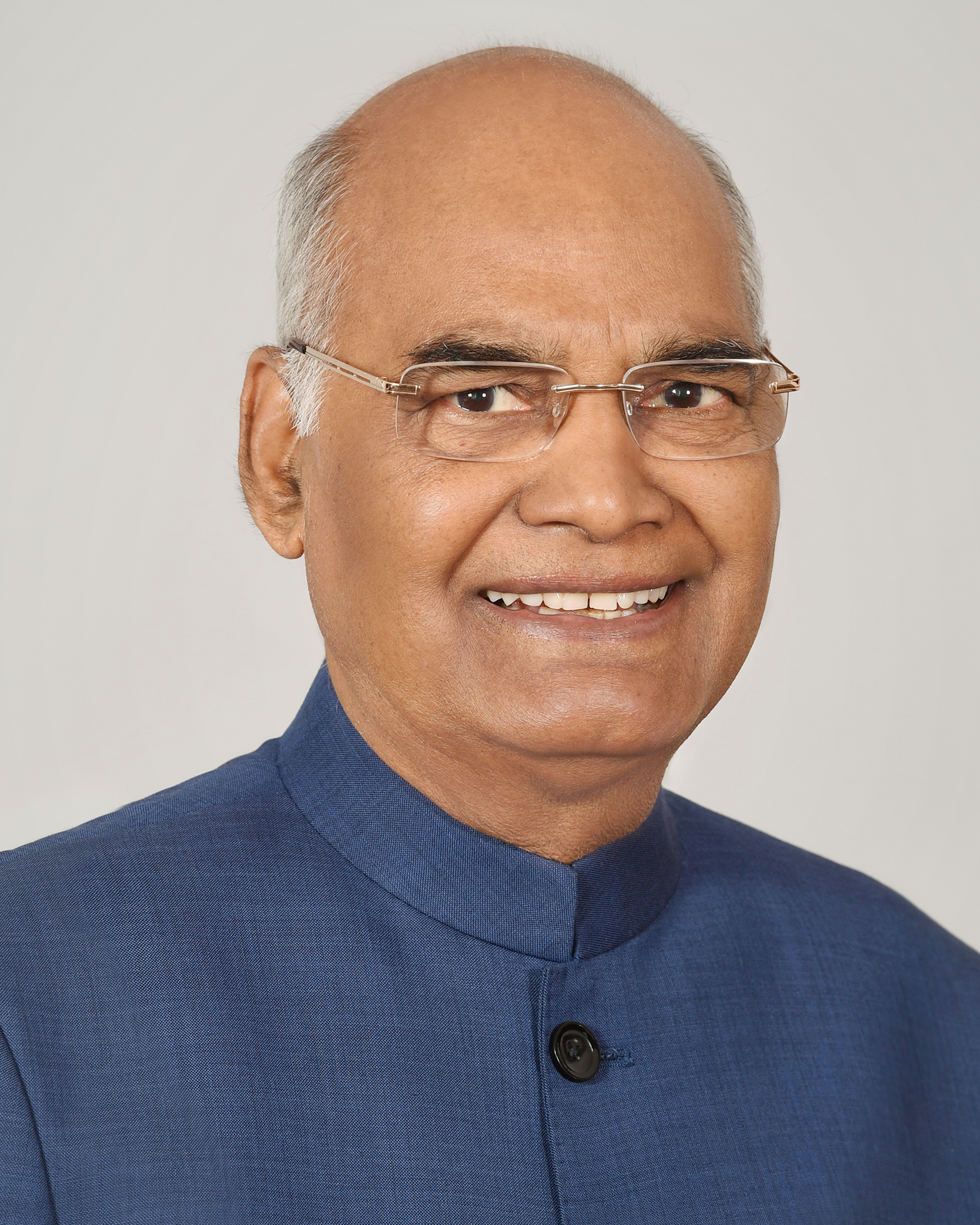

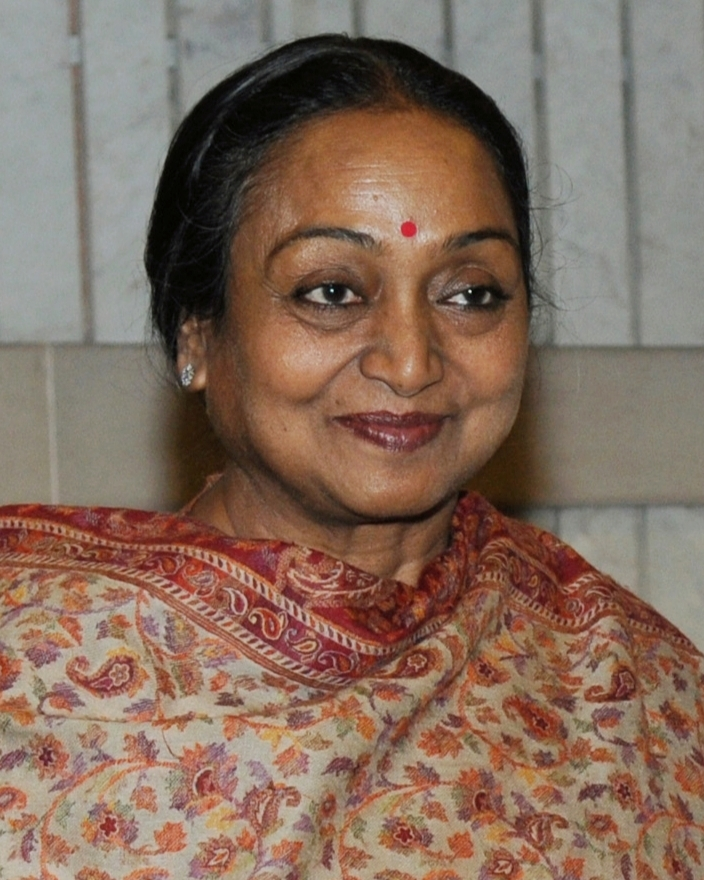
Nominee	Ram Nath Kovind	Meira Kumar
Party	BJP	INC
Alliance	NDA	UPA
Home state	Uttar Pradesh	Bihar
Electoral vote	702,044	367,314
States carried	21	8+NCT+PY
Percentage	65.65%	34.35%
Swing	34.95% ▲	34.95% ▼
President before election
Pranab Mukherjee
INC
President after election
Ram Nath Kovind
BJP

The 2017 presidential election was held in India on 17 July 2017 with the votes counted and the results announced on 20 July 2017. President Pranab Mukherjee, whose term of office was due to expire on 24 July 2017, declined to seek re-election due to health concerns and old age.

Governor of Bihar Ram Nath Kovind of the Bharatiya Janata Party had the backing of the governing National Democratic Alliance coalition, and went up against opposition candidate Meira Kumar of the Indian National Congress in the vote, they both born from Dalit. Kovind secured roughly two-thirds of the votes from the electoral college of elected members of federal, state and union territory legislatures and was elected to a five-year term as President. Kovind's term of office began on 25 July 2017.

== Background ==
There was initial speculation that the incumbent, Pranab Mukherjee, would seek re-election. However, he decided not to run again in 2017, meaning that his term in office ended on 24 July 2017.

=== Selection process ===
The President of India is indirectly elected by an electoral college consisting of the elected members of both houses of parliament, the elected members of the Legislative assemblies of the 28 states and the elected members of the legislative assemblies of the Union Territories of Delhi, Puducherry and Jammu and Kashmir. As of 2017, the electoral college comprises 776 MPs and 4,120 MLAs. The system assigns varying numbers of votes to these electoral college members, such that the total weight of MPs and those of MLAs is roughly equal and that the voting power of states and territories are proportional to their population. Overall the members of the electoral college were eligible to cast 1,098,903 votes, yielding a threshold for a majority of 549,452 votes.

The nomination of a candidate for election to the office of the President must be subscribed by at least 50 electors as proposers and 50 electors as seconders. The election is held by means of a secret ballot under the single transferable vote system. The manner of election of President is provided by Article 55 of the Constitution.

The returning officer for the election was Anoop Mishra, the Secretary General of Lok Sabha.

=== Electoral college partisan composition ===
At the time of the election the NDA coalition itself was short of a majority by about 25,000 votes, but was expected to be able to rely on other parties to breach the small deficit without difficulty.

Party/Alliance	Party composition	Lok Sabha votes	Rajya Sabha votes	State Assemblies votes	Total votes	Percentage
NDA	BJP, SHS, TDP, LJSP, SAD, RLSP, AD, GFP, MGP, AINRC, JKPDP, NPF, NPP, PMK, SDF, SWP	237,888	49,560	239,923	527,371	48.10%
Other parties	AIADMK, YSRCP, JD(U), BJD, TRS, INLD, IND	50,268	20,532	63,107	133,907	12.20%
Government total (including non-NDA parties' support)					661,278	60.30%
UPA	INC, IUML, RSP, KC (M), DMK	34,692	46,020	93,137	173,849	15.90%
Other parties	AITC, CPI(M), NCP, SP, BSP, AAP, RJD, AIUDF, JD(S), JMM, AIMIM, CPI, JKNC	60,180	47,436	152,776	260,392	23.80%
Opposition total					434,241	39.70%

=== Public opinion ===
Although the election was not a popular vote, some general polling was performed to measure public opinion. In both Business Insider-Ipsos and NDTV polls comparing support of the two candidates, Kovind was the more popular choice with 71% and 63% support respectively.

== Candidates ==
Two candidates were nominated. Both the governing NDA coalition and the opposition UPA coalition put forward candidates from their dominant parties, the Bharatiya Janata Party and the Indian National Congress respectively.

=== National Democratic Alliance ===
Name	Born	Current or previous positions	State of birth	Announced	Ref
Ram Nath Kovind	1 October 1945 (age 80); Kanpur Dehat, Uttar Pradesh	26th Governor of Bihar (2015–2017) Other offices: Member of the Rajya Sabha for Uttar Pradesh from 1994 to 2006	Uttar Pradesh	19 June 2017	

=== United Progressive Alliance ===
Name	Born	Current or previous positions	State of birth	Announced	Ref
Meira Kumar	31 March 1945 (age 81); Darbhanga, Bihar	15th Speaker of the Lok Sabha (2009–2014) Other offices: Union Minister of Water Resources in 2009; Union Minister of Social Justice and Empowerment from 2004 to 2009; Member of the Indian Parliament for Sasaram from 2004 to 2014; Member of the Indian Parliament for Karol Bagh from 1996 to 1999; Member of the Indian Parliament for Bijnor from 1985 to 1989	Bihar	22 June 2017	

== Final Presidential Candidates ==
=== National Democratic Alliance ===
National Democratic Alliance
For President
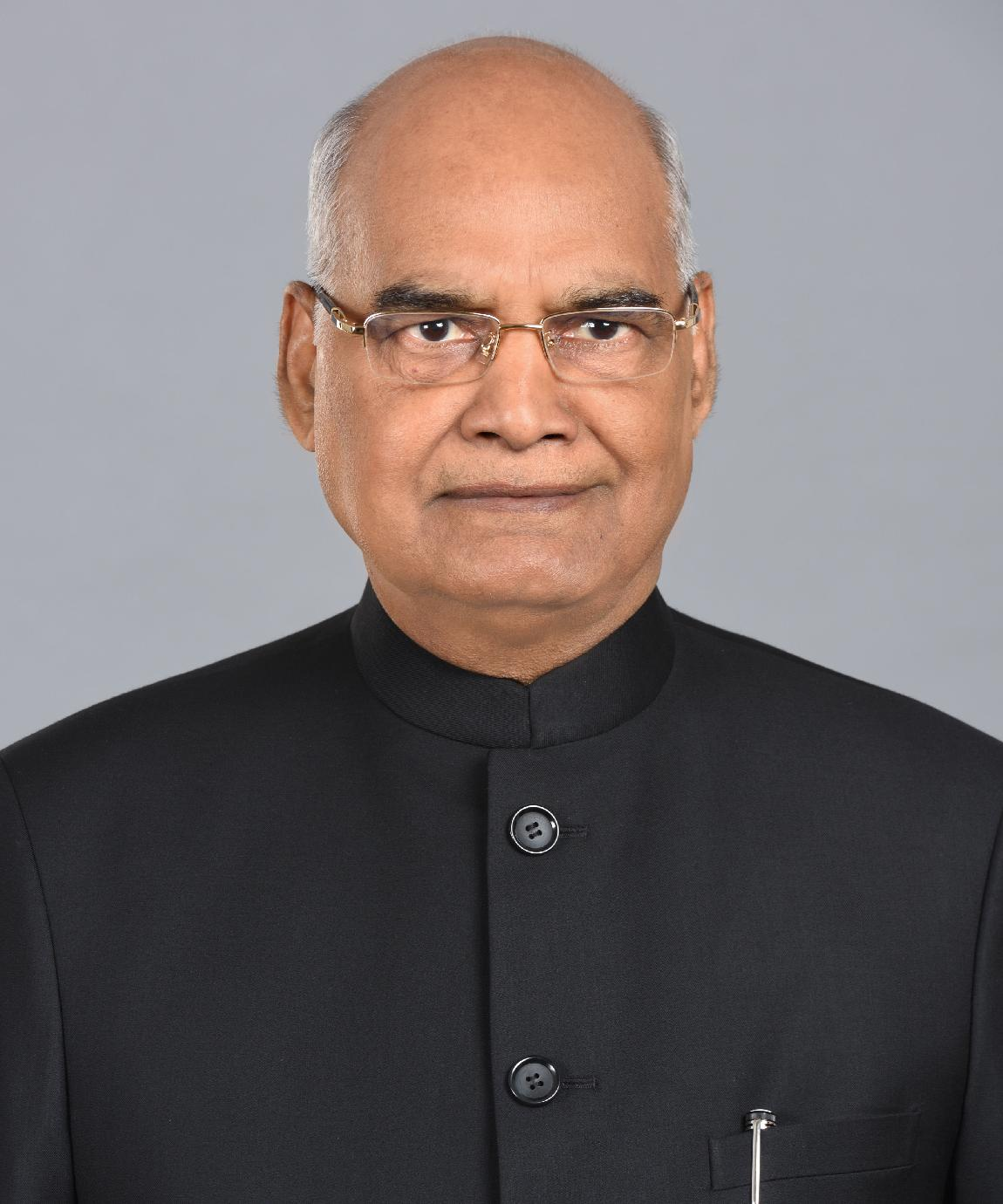
Ramnath Kovind

Bharatiya Janata Party

=== United Progressive Alliance ===
United Progressive Alliance
For President

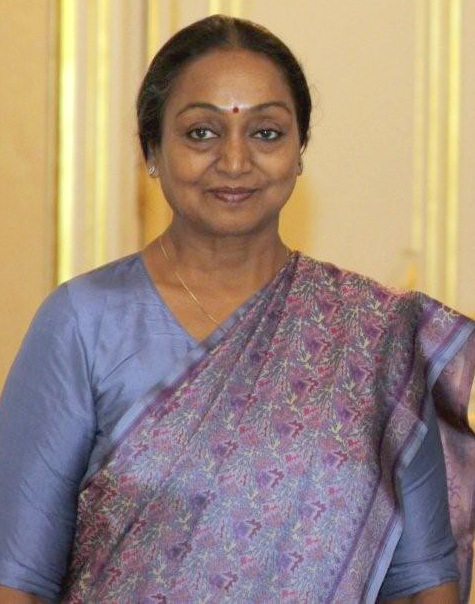

Meira Kumar

Indian National Congress

== Results ==
Ram Nath Kovind was declared as the President-elect after the counting of votes which was held on 20 July 2017. He was administered oath by the Chief Justice of India Jagdish Singh Khehar, to take office as the 15th President of India on 25 July 2017 at the Central Hall located in The Parliament House, New Delhi.

Results of the 2017 Indian presidential election
Candidate	Coalition	Individual votes	Electoral College votes	%
Ram Nath Kovind	NDA	2,930	702,044	65.65
Meira Kumar	UPA	1,844	367,314	34.35
Valid votes		4,774	1,069,358	98.08
Blank and invalid votes		77	20,942	1.92
Total		4,851	1,090,300	100
Registered voters / Turnout		4,896	1,098,903	97.29

=== Reactions ===
Immediately after the results were announced, Prime Minister Narendra Modi tweeted,

"Congratulations to Shri Ram Nath Kovind Ji on being elected the President of India! Best wishes for a fruitful & inspiring tenure."

In another tweet he added

"Gladdened by the extensive support for Shri Ram Nath Kovind Ji among MPs & across various parties. I thank the members of the electoral college."

== See also ==
- List of presidents of India
- List of Indian presidential elections
- Presidency of Ram Nath Kovind
- 2017 Indian vice presidential election
