= 2022 Indian presidential election =

Election of Droupadi Murmu

- 18 July 2022
- Turnout: 99.12% (1.83%▲)
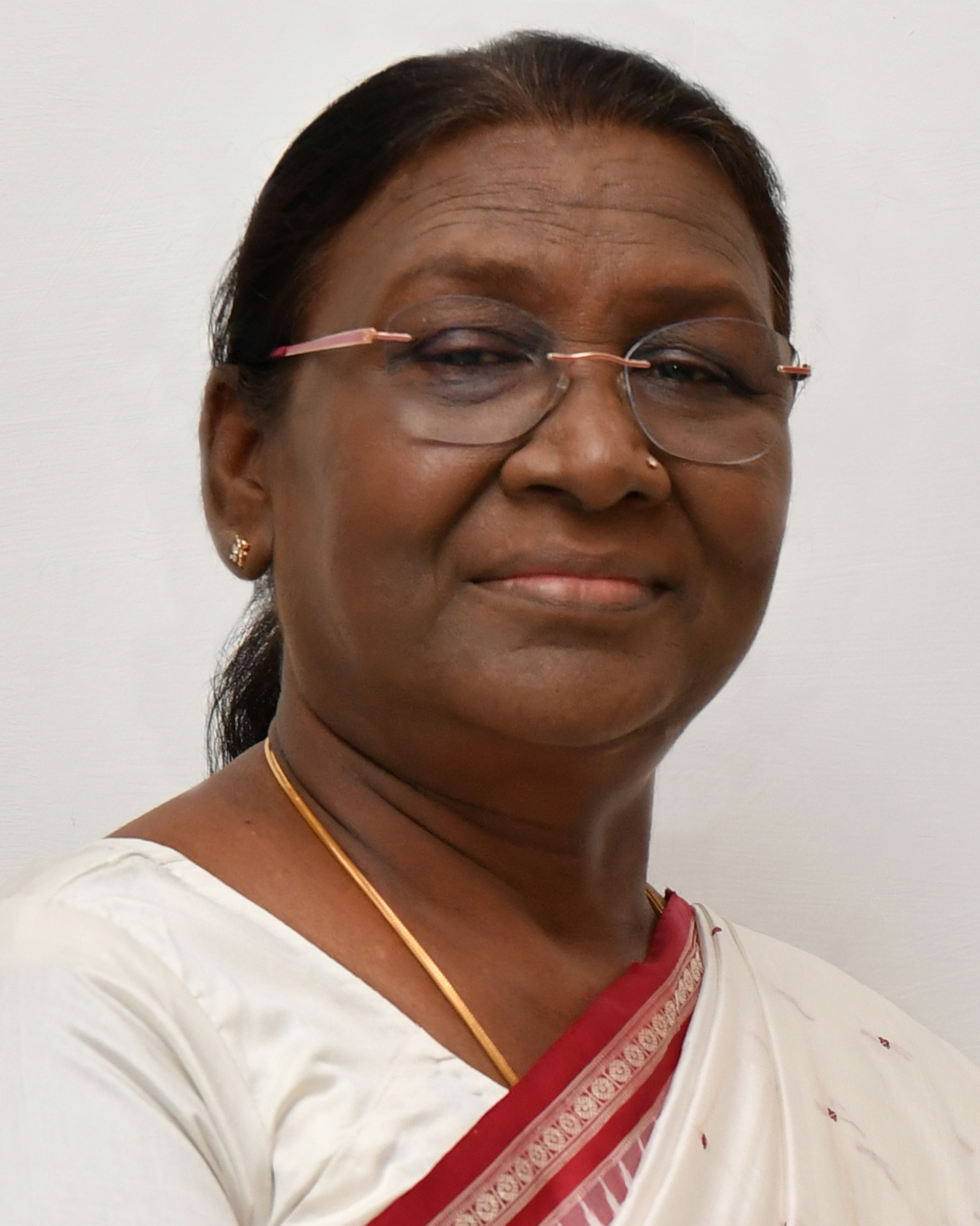

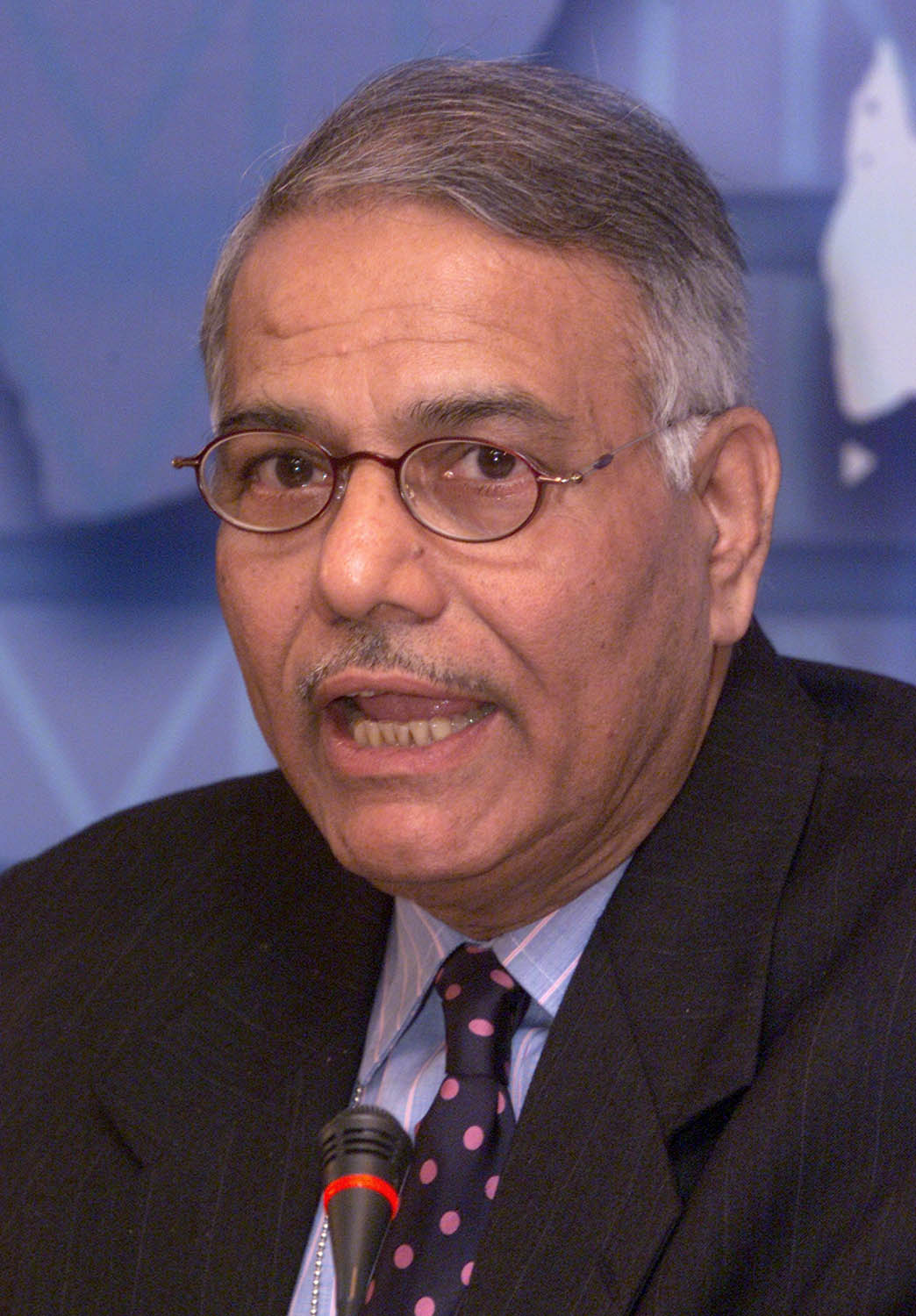
Nominee	Droupadi Murmu	Yashwant Sinha
Party	BJP	AITC
Alliance	NDA	UO
Home state	Odisha	Jharkhand
Electoral vote	676,803	380,177
States carried	21 + PY	7 + NCT
Percentage	64.03%	35.97%
Swing	1.62% ▼	1.62% ▲
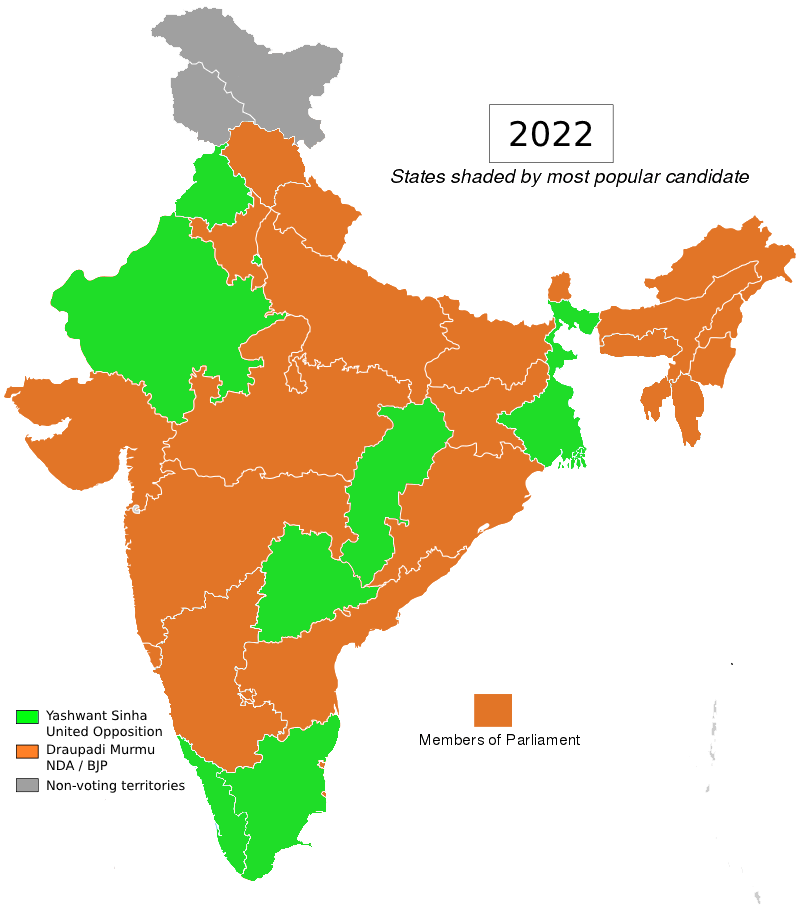
President before election
Ram Nath Kovind
BJP
President after election
Droupadi Murmu
BJP

The 2022 Indian presidential election was the 16th presidential election in India held on 18 July 2022 to elect the president of India. The incumbent president Ram Nath Kovind did not run for reelection.

Bharatiya Janata Party candidate Droupadi Murmu won the election by a margin of 296,626 votes against Yashwant Sinha, the United Opposition candidate. Murmu became the first member of a Scheduled Tribe and second woman to become president, as well as the first president born after independence.

== Electoral system ==
The president of India is indirectly elected by an electoral college consisting of the elected members of the parliament, the elected members of the legislative assemblies of the 28 states, and the elected members of the legislative assemblies of the union territories of Delhi, Puducherry, and Jammu and Kashmir. As of 2022, the electoral college comprises 776 members of Parliament (MPs) and 4,033 members of Legislative Assembly (MLAs) not counting the 90 MLAs of the dissolved Jammu and Kashmir Legislative Assembly.

The Election Commission of India assigns varying numbers of votes to electoral college members, such that the total weight of MPs and MLAs is roughly equal and that the voting power of a state or territory is proportional to its population. Overall, the members of the electoral college are eligible to cast 1,086,431 votes, yielding a threshold for a majority of 543,216 votes. through single transferable system with proportional representation

For a candidate to be in the president's office, they must be subscribed by at least 50 electors as proposers and 50 electors as seconders. The election is held by means of a secret ballot under the instant-runoff voting system. The manner of election of the president is provided by Article 55 of the Constitution.

Article 58 of the Indian Constitution provides that the president and vice president of India must be citizens of India and at least 35 years old. Candidates for the presidency typically seek the nomination of one of the political parties, in which case each party devises a method (such as a primary election) to choose the candidate the party deems best suited to run for the position. Traditionally, the primary elections are indirect elections where voters cast ballots for a slate of party delegates pledged to a particular candidate. The party's delegates then officially nominate a candidate to run on the party's behalf. The general election in July is an indirect election, where voters cast ballots for a slate of members of the Electoral College; these electors in turn directly elect the president and vice president.

By convention, the secretary general of the Lok Sabha and the secretary general of the Rajya Sabha are appointed as the returning officers by rotation. For the 2017 presidential election, the secretary general of the Lok Sabha was appointed as a returning officer. Therefore, for the 2022 presidential election, the secretary general of the Rajya Sabha, Shri P.C. Mody, was appointed as the returning officer in notification by ECI on 13 June 2022.

== Election schedule ==
Under sub-section 1 of Section 4 of the Presidential and Vice-Presidential Elections Act of 1952, the election schedule for the president of India was announced by the Election Commission of India on 9 June 2022.

S.No.	Event	Date	Day
1.	Issue of election commission's notification calling the election	15 June 2022	Wednesday
2.	Last date for making nominations	29 June 2022	Wednesday
3.	Date for the scrutiny of nominations	30 June 2022	Thursday
4.	Last date for the withdrawal of candidatures	2 July 2022	Saturday
5.	Date on which a poll shall, if necessary, be taken	18 July 2022	Monday
6.	Date on which counting, if required, shall be taken	21 July 2022	Thursday

== Electoral college ==
=== Electoral college member strength ===
House				Total
House	NDA	UPA	Others	Total
Lok Sabha	293 / 543 (54%)	147 / 543 (27%)	103 / 543 (19%)	543
Rajya Sabha	120 / 233 (52%)	49 / 233 (21%)	74 / 233 (32%)	228 (excluding 5 vacant seats)
State legislative assemblies	2,136 / 4,036 (53%)	1,224 / 4,036 (30%)	1,253 / 4,036 (31%)	4,025 (excluding 7 vacant seats)
Total	2,234 / 4,796 (47%)	1,200 / 4,796 (25%)	1,430 / 4,796 (30%)	4,796

=== Electoral college vote value composition ===
House				Total
House	NDA	UPA	Others	Total
Lok Sabha votes	244,300 / 380,100 (64%)	63,700 / 380,100 (17%)	72,100 / 380,100 (19%)	380,100
Rajya Sabha votes	72,800 / 159,600 (46%)	35,000 / 159,600 (22%)	51,800 / 159,600 (32%)	159,600 (excluding 5 vacant seats)
State legislative assemblies	145,384 / 542,291 (27%)	177,528 / 542,291 (33%)	542,291 (excluding 7 vacant seats)	
Total votes	536,447 / 1,081,991 (50%)	246,184 / 1,081,991 (23%)	299,328 / 1,081,991 (28%)	1,081,991

- All 4 Rajya Sabha seats and 90 State Legislative Assembly seats of Jammu and Kashmir were vacant, as the Jammu and Kashmir Legislative Assembly was dissolved.
- The lone Rajya Sabha seat of Tripura was vacant.
- Seven seats of the state legislative assemblies across various states (4 of Gujarat, 1 each of Maharashtra, Tripura and West Bengal) are also vacant.

== Party-wise vote (projection) ==
Alliance		Parties		Members of Lok Sabha	Members of Rajya Sabha	Members of State Legislative Assemblies	Total	
BJP Candidate	NDA	1	BJP	212,100	63,700	185,036	458,036	42.33%
BJP Candidate	NDA	2	JD(U)	11,200	3,500	7,901	22,601	2.09%
BJP Candidate	NDA	3	AIADMK	700	2,800	11,440	14,940	1.38%
BJP Candidate	NDA	4	AD(S)	1,400	0	2,496	3,896	0.36%
BJP Candidate	NDA	5	RLJP	3,500	0	0	3,500	0.32%
BJP Candidate	NDA	6	AGP	0	700	1,044	1,744	0.16%
BJP Candidate	NDA	7	MNF	700	700	244	1,644	0.15%
BJP Candidate	NDA	8	PMK	0	700	880	1,580	0.15%
BJP Candidate	NDA	9	NPF	700	700	126	1,526	0.14%
BJP Candidate	NDA	10	UPPL	0	700	812	1,512	0.14%
BJP Candidate	NDA	11	NPP	700	0	549	1,249	0.12%
BJP Candidate	NDA	12	NISHAD	0	0	1,248	1,248	0.12%
BJP Candidate	NDA	13	JJP	0	0	1,120	1,120	0.10%
BJP Candidate	NDA	14	NDPP	700	0	378	1,078	0.10%
BJP Candidate	NDA	15	AJSU	700	0	352	1,052	0.10%
BJP Candidate	NDA	16	SKM	700	0	133	833	0.47%
BJP Candidate	NDA	17	RPI(A)	0	700	0	700	0.47%
BJP Candidate	NDA	18	TMC(M)	0	700	0	700	0.47%
BJP Candidate	NDA	19	HAM	0	0	692	692	0.47%
BJP Candidate	NDA	20	PJP	0	0	350	350	0.47%
BJP Candidate	NDA	21	BPF	0	0	348	348	0.47%
BJP Candidate	NDA	22	IPFT	0	0	182	182	0.47%
BJP Candidate	NDA	23	PBK	0	0	176	176	0.47%
BJP Candidate	NDA	24	JSS	0	0	175	175	0.47%
BJP Candidate	NDA	25	RSP	0	0	175	175	0.47%
BJP Candidate	NDA	26	AINRC	0	0	160	160	0.47%
BJP Candidate	NDA	27	JSP	0	0	159	159	0.47%
BJP Candidate	NDA	28	UDP	0	0	136	136	0.47%
BJP Candidate	NDA	29	HLP	0	0	112	112	0.47%
BJP Candidate	NDA	30	PDF	0	0	68	68	0.47%
BJP Candidate	NDA	31	MGP	0	0	40	40	0.47%
BJP Candidate	NDA	32	KPA	0	0	36	36	0.47%
BJP Candidate	NDA	33	HSPDP	0	0	34	34	0.47%
BJP Candidate	NDA	34	Independents	2,100	700	4,340	7,140	0.66%
BJP Candidate	Total of NDA						528,942	48.89%
BJP Candidate	Non-NDA	35	YSRCP	15,400	6,300	24,009	45,709	4.22%
BJP Candidate	Non-NDA	36	BJD	8,400	6,300	16,986	31,686	2.93%
BJP Candidate	Non-NDA	37	BSP	7,000	700	710	8,410	0.78%
BJP Candidate	Non-NDA	38	SS (Shinde)	0	0	7,000	7,000	0.65%
BJP Candidate	Non-NDA	39	JMM	700	700	5,280	6,680	0.62%
BJP Candidate	Non-NDA	40	JD(S)	700	700	4,496	5,896	0.54%
BJP Candidate	Non-NDA	41	SAD	1,400	0	348	1,748	0.16%
BJP Candidate	Non-NDA	42	BVA	0	0	525	525	0.05
BJP Candidate	Non-NDA	43	SDF	0	700	7	707	0.07
BJP Candidate	Non-NDA	44	LJP(RV)	700	0	0	700	0.06
BJP Candidate	Non-NDA	45	JCC	0	0	387	1153	0.11%
BJP Candidate	Non-NDA	46	MNS	0	0	175	1153	0.11%
BJP Candidate	Non-NDA	47	PWPI	0	0	175	1153	0.11%
BJP Candidate	Non-NDA	48	JD(L)	0	0	416	1153	0.11%
BJP Candidate	Non-NDA	49	SS (Uddhav)	13,300	2,100	2,800	18,200	1.68%
BJP Candidate	Non-NDA	50	SBSP	0	0	1,248	1,248	0.12%
BJP Candidate	Non-NDA	51	TDP	2,100	700	3,657	6,457	0.60%
BJP Candidate	Non-NDA	52	RLP	700	0	387	1,087	0.10%
BJP Candidate	Non-NDA Backing BJP Candidate						137,206	12.69%
Total Votes for BJP Candidate							666,148	61.58%
Opposition candidate (AITC)	AITC	1	AITC	16,100	9,100	33,432	58,632	5.42%
Opposition candidate (AITC)	UPA	2	INC	37,100	21,700	88,578	147,378	13.62%
Opposition candidate (AITC)	UPA	3	DMK	16,800	7,000	22,096	45,896	4.24%
Opposition candidate (AITC)	UPA	4	NCP	3,500	2,800	9,919	16,219	1.50%
Opposition candidate (AITC)	UPA	5	IUML	2,100	1,400	2,280	5,780	0.53%
Opposition candidate (AITC)	UPA	6	JKNC	2,100	0	0	2,100	0.19%
Opposition candidate (AITC)	UPA	7	VCK	700	0	704	1,404	0.13%
Opposition candidate (AITC)	UPA	8	MDMK	0	700	704	1,404	0.13%
Opposition candidate (AITC)	UPA	9	RSP	700	0	0	700	0.20%
Opposition candidate (AITC)	UPA	10	MMK	0	0	352	352	0.20%
Opposition candidate (AITC)	UPA	11	KC	0	0	304	304	0.20%
Opposition candidate (AITC)	UPA	12	KMDK	0	0	176	176	0.20%
Opposition candidate (AITC)	UPA	13	TVK	0	0	176	176	0.20%
Opposition candidate (AITC)	UPA	14	KC(J)	0	0	152	152	0.20%
Opposition candidate (AITC)	UPA	15	NCK	0	0	152	152	0.20%
Opposition candidate (AITC)	UPA	16	RMPI	0	0	152	152	0.20%
Opposition candidate (AITC)	UPA	17	GFP	0	0	20	20	0.20%
Opposition candidate (AITC)	UPA	18	Independents	0	700	2,264	2,964	0.27%
Opposition candidate (AITC)	Total of UPA + AITC						283,961	26.23%
Opposition candidate (AITC)	SP+	19	SP	2,100	2,100	23,438	27,638	2.55%
Opposition candidate (AITC)	SP+	20	RLD	0	700	1,793	2,493	0.23%
Opposition candidate (AITC)	SP+	21	Independents	0	700	0	700	0.06%
Opposition candidate (AITC)	Left	22	CPI(M)	2,100	3,500	11,086	16,686	1.54%
Opposition candidate (AITC)	Left	23	CPI	1,400	1,400	3,457	6,257	0.58%
Opposition candidate (AITC)	Left	24	CPI(ML)L	0	0	2,252	2,252	0.21%
Opposition candidate (AITC)	Left	25	KC(M)	700	700	760	2,160	0.20%
Opposition candidate (AITC)	Left	26	C(S)	0	0	152	1520	0.14%
Opposition candidate (AITC)	Left	27	INL	0	0	152	1520	0.14%
Opposition candidate (AITC)	Left	28	JKC	0	0	152	1520	0.14%
Opposition candidate (AITC)	Left	29	KC(B)	0	0	152	1520	0.14%
Opposition candidate (AITC)	Left	30	NSC	0	0	152	1520	0.14%
Opposition candidate (AITC)	Left	31	Independents	0	0	760	1520	0.14%
Opposition candidate (AITC)	Others	32	TRS	6,300	4,900	13,596	24,796	2.29%
Opposition candidate (AITC)	Others	33	AAP	0	7,000	14,308	21,308	1.97%
Opposition candidate (AITC)	Others	34	RJD	0	4,200	13,476	17,676	1.63%
Opposition candidate (AITC)	Others	35	AIMIM	1,400	0	2,139	3,539	0.33%
Opposition candidate (AITC)	Others	36	AIUDF	700	0	1,740	2,440	0.23%
Opposition candidate (AITC)	Others	37	GJM	0	0	151	151	0.01%
Opposition candidate (AITC)	Others	38	ISF	0	0	151	151	0.01%
Opposition candidate (AITC)	Non-UPA Backing Opposition candidate						129,767	11.98%
Total Votes for Opposition candidate							413,728	38.29%
Others	Undecided	1	BTP	0	0	552	552	0.05%
Others	Undecided	2	SAD(A)	700	0	0	700	0.11%
Others	Undecided	3	SWP	0	0	175	175	0.11%
Others	Undecided	4	RD	0	0	116	116	0.11%
Others	Undecided	5	INLD	0	0	112	112	0.11%
Others	Undecided	6	ZPM	0	0	48	48	0.11%
Others	Undecided	7	RGP	0	0	20	20	0.11%
Others	Undecided	8	KHNAM	0	0	17	17	0.11%
Others	Undecided	9	Independents	0	0	363	363	0.03%
Total of Undecided							2,103	0.19%
Total				380,100	159,600 (5 Vacant)	542,291 (7 Vacant)	1,081,991	100%

== Candidates ==
On 21 June 2022, Yashwant Sinha, a former AITC leader, was unanimously chosen as the common candidate of UPA and other opposition parties for the 2022 presidential election. On the same day, NDA chose Droupadi Murmu as its presidential candidate.

=== National Democratic Alliance ===
Name	Born	Alliance	Positions held	Home state	Date announced	Ref
Droupadi Murmu	20 June 1958 (aged 64); Baidaposi, Odisha	National Democratic Alliance (BJP)	Governor of Jharkhand (2015–2021); Member of the Odisha Legislative Assembly from Rairangpur (2000–2009); Minister of State in the Odisha Government (2000–2004)	Odisha	21 June 2022	

=== United Opposition (India) ===
Name	Born	Alliance	Positions held	Home state	Date announced	Ref
Yashwant Sinha	6 November 1937 (aged 84); Patna, Bihar	United Opposition (TMC)	External Affairs Minister of India (2002–2004); Leader of the House in Rajya Sabha (1990–1991); Finance Minister of India (1990–1991, 1998–2002); Member of Parliament, Lok Sabha from Hazaribagh (1998–2004, 2009–14); Member of Parliament, Rajya Sabha from Jharkhand from (2004–2009); Member of Parliament, Rajya Sabha from Bihar from (1988–1994)	Bihar	21 June 2022	

== Potential candidates ==
=== List of Presidential candidates Party India ===
Party	Leader	Seats contested
Republican Party (India)	Pushpam Priya Choudhary	TBD
Democratic Party (India)	Sushil Kumar	TBD
Labour Party (India)	Mukesh Sahani	TBD
Conservative Party (India)	Javed Khans	TBD

- Vice President –
- Gopalkrishna Gandhi
- Sharad Pawar

== Campaign ==
During her election campaign, Murmu visited various states seeking support. Several opposition parties, including BJD, JMM, BSP, SS, YSRCP, SAD, and JDS, announced support for her candidature prior to polling.

== Controversy ==
Congress filed a complaint with the Election Commission against Droupadi Murmu and BJP leaders, alleging poll code violation in Karnataka. The Indian National Congress alleged that the ruling BJP had influenced the MLAs by offering bribes and other inducements in violation of the election code. The MLAs were called for training on voting in the presidential election and allegedly provided luxurious rooms, meals, liquor, drinks and entertainment.

== Results ==
Results of the 2022 Indian presidential election
Candidate	Coalition	Individual votes	Electoral College votes	%
Droupadi Murmu	National Democratic Alliance	2,824	676,803	64.03
Yashwant Sinha	United	1877	380,177	35.97
Valid votes		4,701	1,056,980	98.89
Blank and invalid votes		53	15,397	1.11
Total		4,754	1,072,377	100
Registered voters / Turnout		4,809	1,086,431	98.86

=== Breakdown ===
State/UT	Electors	Droupadi Murmu	Yashwant Sinha	Invalid	Abstain
Members of Parliament	771	540	208	129	66
Andhra Pradesh	175	173	0	0	2
Arunachal Pradesh	60	55	4	0	1
Assam	126	104	20	0	2
Bihar	243	133	106	2	1
Chhattisgarh	90	21	69	0	0
Goa	40	28	12	0	0
Gujarat	178	121	57	0	0
Haryana	90	59	30	0	1
Himachal Pradesh	68	45	22	1	0
Jharkhand	81	70	9	1	1
Karnataka	224	150	70	4	0
Kerala	140	1	139	0	0
Madhya Pradesh	230	146	79	5	0
Maharashtra	287	181	98	4	3
Manipur	60	54	6	0	0
Meghalaya	60	47	8	1	4
Mizoram	40	29	11	0	0
Nagaland	60	59	0	0	1
Odisha	147	137	9	0	1
Punjab	117	8	101	5	3
Rajasthan	200	75	123	0	2
Sikkim	32	32	0	0	0
Tamil Nadu	234	75	158	1	0
Telangana	119	3	113	1	2
Tripura	59	41	17	0	1
Uttar Pradesh	403	287	111	3	2
Uttarakhand	70	51	15	1	3
West Bengal	293	71	216	4	2
Delhi	70	8	56	4	2
Puducherry	30	20	9	1	0
Total	4,796	2,824	1,877	53	42

== Reactions ==
Right after Murmu was announced as the winner, numerous congratulations and wishes from other world leaders were posted on social media. Russian President Vladimir Putin extended his greetings to Droupadi Murmu for being elected as the president of India and hoped for further development of the Russian–Indian political dialogue and productive cooperation in different areas under her leadership. President of the United States Joe Biden congratulated her and stated her victory was the "strength of Indian democracy". Chinese President Xi Jinping congratulated her and said that he would be willing to work with her to enhance political mutual trust between China and India. The presidents of Nepal, Sri Lanka, Maldives, Bangladesh, and other countries also congratulated her.

After the election results came out, tribal communities in several states celebrated her victory. Many minority tribal communities in Bangladesh, including the Santal community, congratulated Murmu.

== See also ==
- 2022 elections in India
- 2022 Indian vice presidential election
- List of Indian presidential elections
- List of presidents of India
