= List of Indian general elections =

Direct national elections for the lower house of the Indian Parliament

Lok Sabha Elections
- General Elections in India
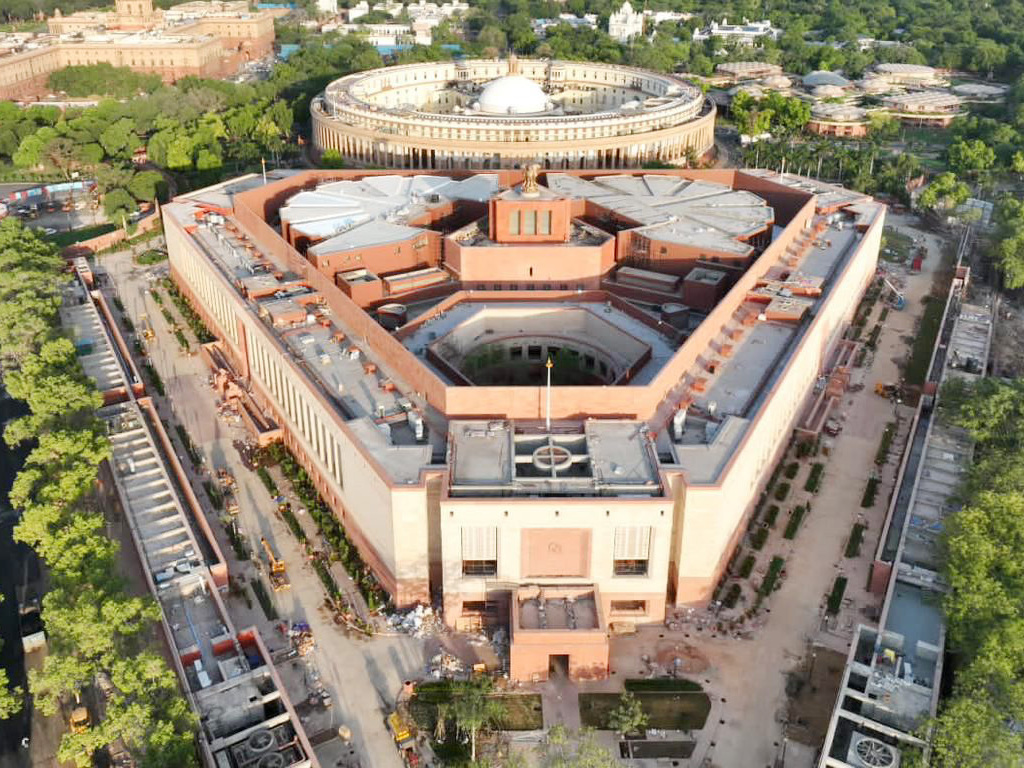
- The Parliament House in New Delhi, where the Lok Sabha convenes.
- Country: India
- Elected body: Lok Sabha (House of the People)
- Type: National general election
- Electoral system: First-past-the-post (FPTP)
- Frequency: Every 5 years (or sooner if dissolved)
- Constitutional basis: Article 81 of the Constitution
- Electoral authority: Election Commission of India (ECI)
- Total constituencies: 543 (current)
- Voter eligibility: Universal adult franchise (18 years and older)
- Voting method: Electronic Voting Machines (EVMs) with VVPAT
- First election: 1951–1952
- Latest election: 2024
- Next election: 2029

Lok Sabha elections, formally known as the General Elections in India, are the national democratic elections held to elect members to the Lok Sabha (House of the People), the lower house of the Parliament of India. Members of the Lok Sabha are elected by being voted upon by all adult citizens of India, from a set of candidates who stand in their respective constituencies. Every adult citizen of India can vote only in their registered constituency. Candidates who win the Lok Sabha elections are called 'Member of Parliament' (MP) and hold their seats for five years, or until the body is dissolved by the President of India on the advice of the Council of Ministers.

The elections are administered and conducted by the Election Commission of India (ECI), an autonomous constitutional authority. The Lok Sabha currently has 543 parliamentary constituencies distributed across all states and union territories. To form a majority government, a political party or coalition must secure at least 272 seats. India follows a first-past-the-post electoral system.

The first elections to the Lok Sabha took place during 1951–52, following the adoption of the Constitution of India. Over the decades, these elections have grown into the largest democratic exercises in human history. The voting process relies extensively on Electronic Voting Machines (EVMs) equipped with Voter Verifiable Paper Audit Trail systems to ensure transparency.

== Electoral system ==
Article 83 of the Constitution of India mandates that elections to the Lok Sabha be held at least once every five years. The country is currently divided into 543 single-member parliamentary constituencies.

Certain constituencies are reserved for historically disadvantaged communities: as of the 2024 election, 84 seats are reserved for Scheduled Castes (SC) and 47 seats are reserved for Scheduled Tribes (ST). Following the passing of the 106th Amendment Act (Women's Reservation Bill) and future delimitation exercises scheduled post-2026, 33% of the total seats will be reserved for women. The two seats formerly reserved for the Anglo-Indian community were abolished by the 104th constitutional amendment in 2020.

== List of Lok Sabha general elections in India ==
Election year	Lok Sabha	Total Seats	Turnout	Party in government	Seats won by the ruling party	Margin of majority	Vote Percentage of majority	Seats controlled by coalition	Prime Minister
1951–52	First	489	45.67%	Indian National Congress	364	120	74.48%	—	Jawaharlal Nehru
1957	Second	494	45.44%	Indian National Congress	371	123	75.10%	—	Jawaharlal Nehru
1962	Third	494	55.42%	Indian National Congress	361	113	73.08%	—	Jawaharlal Nehru
1962	Third	494	55.42%	Indian National Congress	361	113	73.08%	—	Lal Bahadur Shastri (1964–1966)
1967	Fourth	520	61.04%	Indian National Congress	283	22	54.42%	—	Indira Gandhi
1971	Fifth	518	55.27%	Indian National Congress	352	92	67.95%	—	Indira Gandhi
1977	Sixth	542	60.49%	Janata Party	295	23	54.98%	345	Morarji Desai
1977	Sixth	542	60.49%	Janata Party (Secular)	—	—	—	248	Charan Singh
1980	Seventh	529	56.92%	Indian National Congress	353	88	64.76%	—	Indira Gandhi
1984	Eighth	541	64.01%	Indian National Congress	414	143	76.52%	—	Rajiv Gandhi
1989	Ninth	529	61.95%	Janata Dal	143	–112	27.03%	—	V. P. Singh
1989	Ninth	529	61.95%	Samajwadi Janata Party	64	–201	12.10%	—	Chandra Shekhar
1991	Tenth	534	56.73%	Indian National Congress	244	–24	45.69%	263	P. V. Narasimha Rao
1996	Eleventh	543	57.94%	Bharatiya Janata Party	161	–111	29.65%	187	Atal Bihari Vajpayee (16 May 1996 – 1 June 1996)
1996	Eleventh	543	57.94%	Janata Dal	46	–226	8.47%	192	H. D. Deve Gowda (1 June 1996 – 21 April 1997)
1996	Eleventh	543	57.94%	Janata Dal	46	–226	8.47%	192	I. K. Gujral (21 April 1997 – 19 March 1998)
1998	Twelfth	543	61.97%	Bharatiya Janata Party	182	–90	33.39%	276	Atal Bihari Vajpayee
1999	Thirteenth	543	59.99%	Bharatiya Janata Party	182	–90	33.39%	304	Atal Bihari Vajpayee
2004	Fourteenth	543	58.07%	Indian National Congress	145	–127	26.70%	218	Manmohan Singh
2009	Fifteenth	543	58.21%	Indian National Congress	206	–66	37.80%	262	Manmohan Singh
2014	Sixteenth	543	66.44%	Bharatiya Janata Party	282	10	51.74%	336	Narendra Modi
2019	Seventeenth	543	67.40%	Bharatiya Janata Party	303	31	55.80%	353	Narendra Modi
2024	Eighteenth	543	66.33%	Bharatiya Janata Party	240	–32	44.19%	293	Narendra Modi

== See also ==
- Elections in India
- List of Indian presidential elections
- List of Indian vice presidential elections
- List of Rajya Sabha elections
- List of Indian state legislative assembly elections
- Government of India
- Parliament of India
- Lok Sabha
- Rajya Sabha
- Member of Parliament, Lok Sabha
- Member of Parliament, Rajya Sabha
