= 2022 Indian vice presidential election =

Indian vice presidential election

- 6 August 2022
- Turnout: 92.95% (▼5.26%)
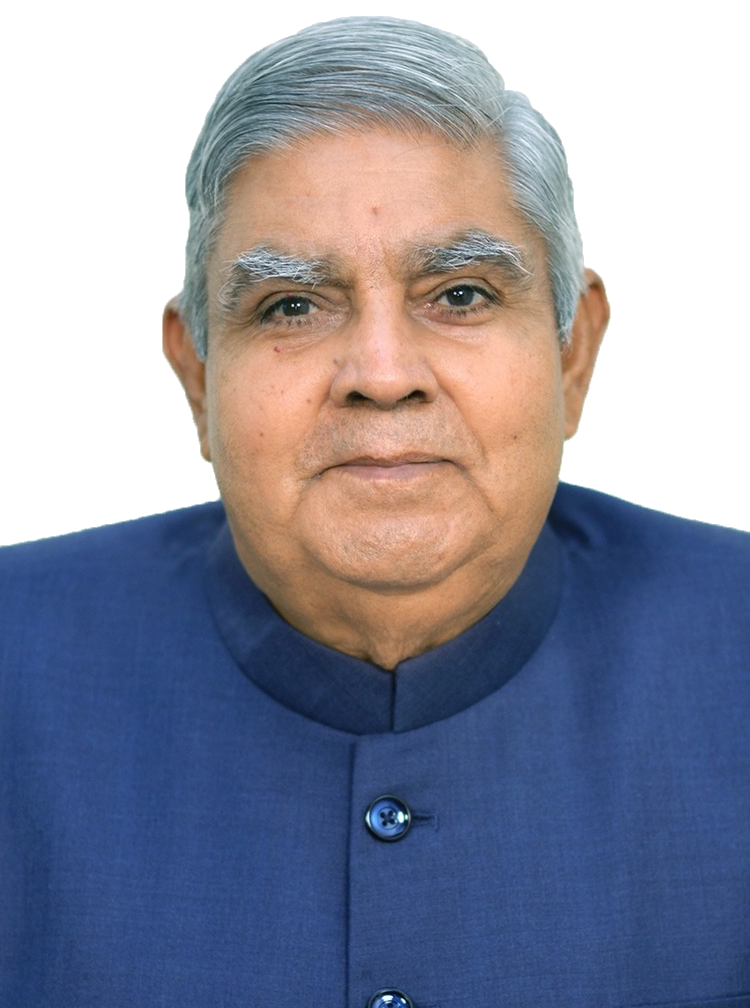

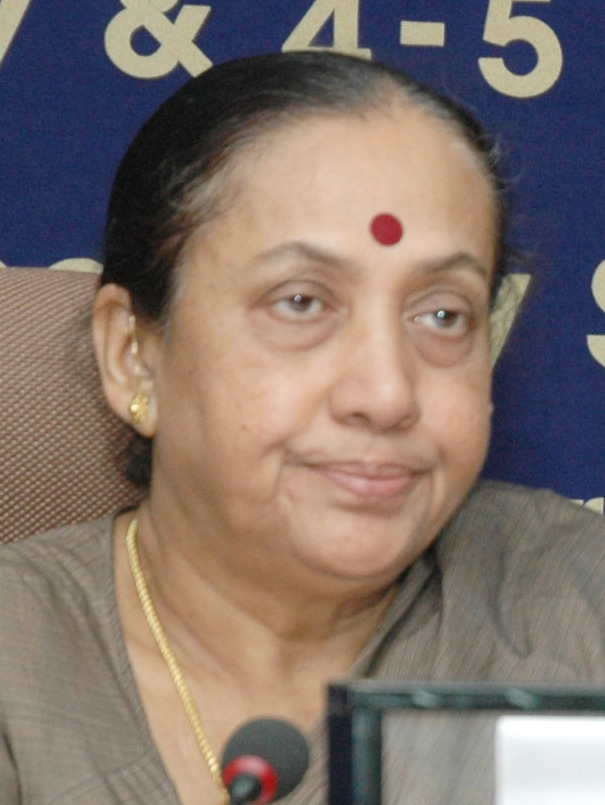
Nominee	Jagdeep Dhankhar	Margaret Alva
Party	BJP	INC
Alliance	NDA	UO
Home state	Rajasthan	Karnataka
Electoral vote	528	182
Percentage	74.37%	25.63%
Swing	6.48% ▲	6.48% ▼
Vice President before election
Venkaiah Naidu
BJP
Elected Vice President
Jagdeep Dhankhar
BJP

The election for the 14th vice president of India was held on 6 August 2022. The announcement was made by the Election Commission of India. Article 67 of the Constitution of India provides that the vice president of India shall remain in office for a period of five years. The winner of this election was Jagdeep Dhankhar, who succeeded Venkaiah Naidu as vice president on 11 August 2022. On 16 July 2022, Jagdeep Dhankhar, the then-serving Governor of West Bengal, was nominated as a vice-presidential candidate by the BJP. On 17 July 2022, Margaret Alva was announced as the vice-presidential candidate by the UO and some non-UO Parties. Hence, Jagdeep Dhankhar won the election with 528 electoral votes, defeating the United Opposition candidate Margaret Alva. It was the vice-presidential election with the largest margin of victory since the 1992.

== Electoral system ==
The Vice President is elected by an electoral college, which includes members of the Rajya Sabha and of the Lok Sabha. The nominated members of the upper house are also eligible to vote in the election process. Voting is done by secret ballot.

== Election schedule ==
Under sub-section (1) of Section (4) of the Presidential and Vice-Presidential Elections Act 1952, the schedule for the election of the Vice President of India had been announced by the Election Commission of India on 29 June 2022.

S.No.	Event	Date	Day
1.	Issue of election commission's notification calling the election	5 July 2022	Tuesday
2.	Last date for making nominations	19 July 2022	Tuesday
3.	Date for the scrutiny of nominations	20 July 2022	Wednesday
4.	Last date for the withdrawal of candidatures	22 July 2022	Friday
5.	Date on which a poll shall, if necessary, be taken	6 August 2022	Saturday
6.	Date on which counting, if required, shall be taken	6 August 2022	Saturday

== Electoral college ==
House			
House	NDA	UO	Others
Lok Sabha	349 / 543 (64%)	91 / 543 (17%)	103 / 543 (19%)
Rajya Sabha	115 / 237 (49%)	50 / 237 (21%)	74 / 237 (31%)
Total	462 / 780 (59%)	141 / 780 (18%)	177 / 780 (23%)

- Jammu and Kashmir Legislative Assembly was dissolved and President's rule had been imposed, so the all 4 Rajya Sabha seats of Jammu and Kashmir are vacant.
- The only Rajya Sabha seat of Tripura was also vacant.
- 3 nominated member seats in the Rajya Sabha were also vacant.

== Candidates ==
=== National Democratic Alliance ===
Name	Born	Alliance	Positions held	Home state	Date announced	Ref
Jagdeep Dhankhar	18 May 1951 (age 75); Kithana, Rajasthan	National Democratic Alliance	Governor of West Bengal (2019-2022); Minister of State for Parliamentary Affairs (1990–91); Lok Sabha MP from Jhunjhunu (1989–91); Member of Rajasthan Legislative Assembly from Kishangarh (1993–98)	Rajasthan	16 July 2022	

=== United Opposition ===
Name	Born	Alliance	Positions held	Home state	Date announced	Ref
Margaret Alva	14 April 1942 (age 84); Mangaluru, Karnataka	United Opposition (India)	Rajya Sabha MP from Karnataka (1974-1998); Minister of State for Parliamentary Affairs (1984-1985, 1993-1996); Minister of State for Youth Affairs and Sports (1985-1989); Minister of State for Personnel, Public Grievances and Pensions (1991-1996); Lok Sabha MP from Kanara (1999-2004); Governor of Rajasthan (2012-2014); Governor of Uttarakhand (2009-2012); Governor of Gujarat (2014); Governor of Goa (2014)	Karnataka	17 July 2022	

== Results ==
Results of the Indian vice-presidential election, 2022
Candidate	Party (Coalition)	Electoral Votes	% of Votes
Jagdeep Dhankhar	BJP (NDA)	528	74.37
Margaret Alva	INC (UO)	182	25.63
Total		710	100
Valid Votes		710	
Invalid Votes		15	
Turnout		725	92.95%
Abstentions		55	7.05%
Electors		780	

== See also ==
- 2022 elections in India
- 2022 Indian presidential election
- List of Indian vice presidential elections
- List of vice presidents of India
- Narendra Modi
- Droupadi Murmu
- Vice President of India
- Lok sabha
- Rajya Sabha
- Parliament of India
- President of india
