= Kongu Desa Makkal Katchi =

- Secretary: M Ramasamy Gounder
- Founded: 11 August 2014
- Headquarters: Coimbatore, Kongu Nadu, India
- Ideology: Indigenism
- Alliance: National Democratic Alliance

Kongu Desa Makkal Katchi (KDMK) is a political party in the Indian state of Tamil Nadu. The party's vote base is mainly concentrated in the Kongu Nadu region of Tamil Nadu.
