= 1957 Indian presidential election =

Re-election of Rajendra Prasad

- 6 May 1957
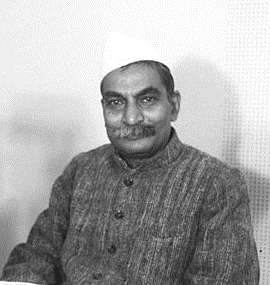

Nominee	Rajendra Prasad	Chaudhary Hari Ram
Party	INC	Independent
Home state	Bihar	Punjab
Electoral vote	459,698	2,672
Percentage	98.99%	0.58%
President before election
Rajendra Prasad
INC
Elected President
Rajendra Prasad
INC

The Election Commission of India held indirect second presidential elections of India on 6 May 1957. Rajendra Prasad won his re-election with 459,698 votes over his rivals Chaudhary Hari Ram and Nagendra Narayan Das, who received 2,672 votes and 2,000 votes respectively. Prasad has been the only person to have won and served two terms as the president of India.

== Schedule ==
The election schedule was announced by the Election Commission of India on 6 April 1957.

S.No.	Poll Event	Date
1.	Last Date for filing nomination	16 April 1957
2.	Date for Scrutiny of nomination	17 April 1957
3.	Last Date for Withdrawal of nomination	20 April 1957
4.	Date of Poll	6 May 1957
5.	Date of Counting	10 May 1957

== Results ==
Candidate	Votes
Rajendra Prasad	459,698
Chaudhary Hari Ram	2,672
Nagendra Narayan Das	2,000
Total	464,370

== See also ==
- 1957 Indian vice presidential election
