= 1982 Indian presidential election =

Election of Zail Singh

- 12 July 1982
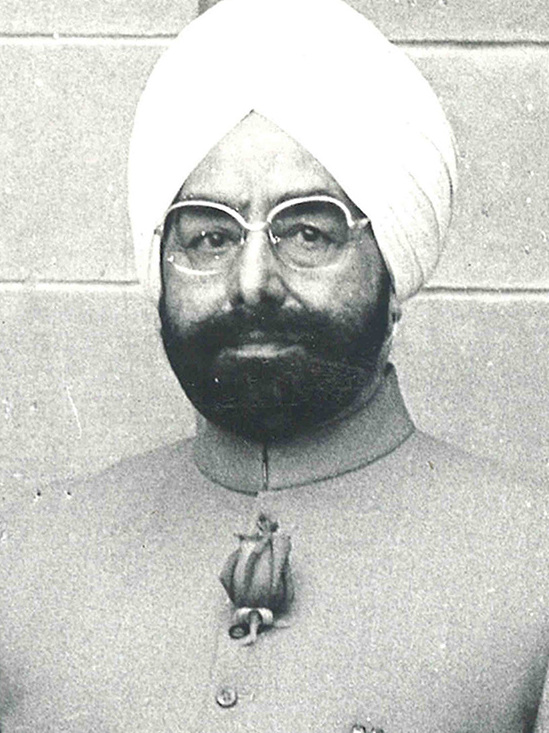

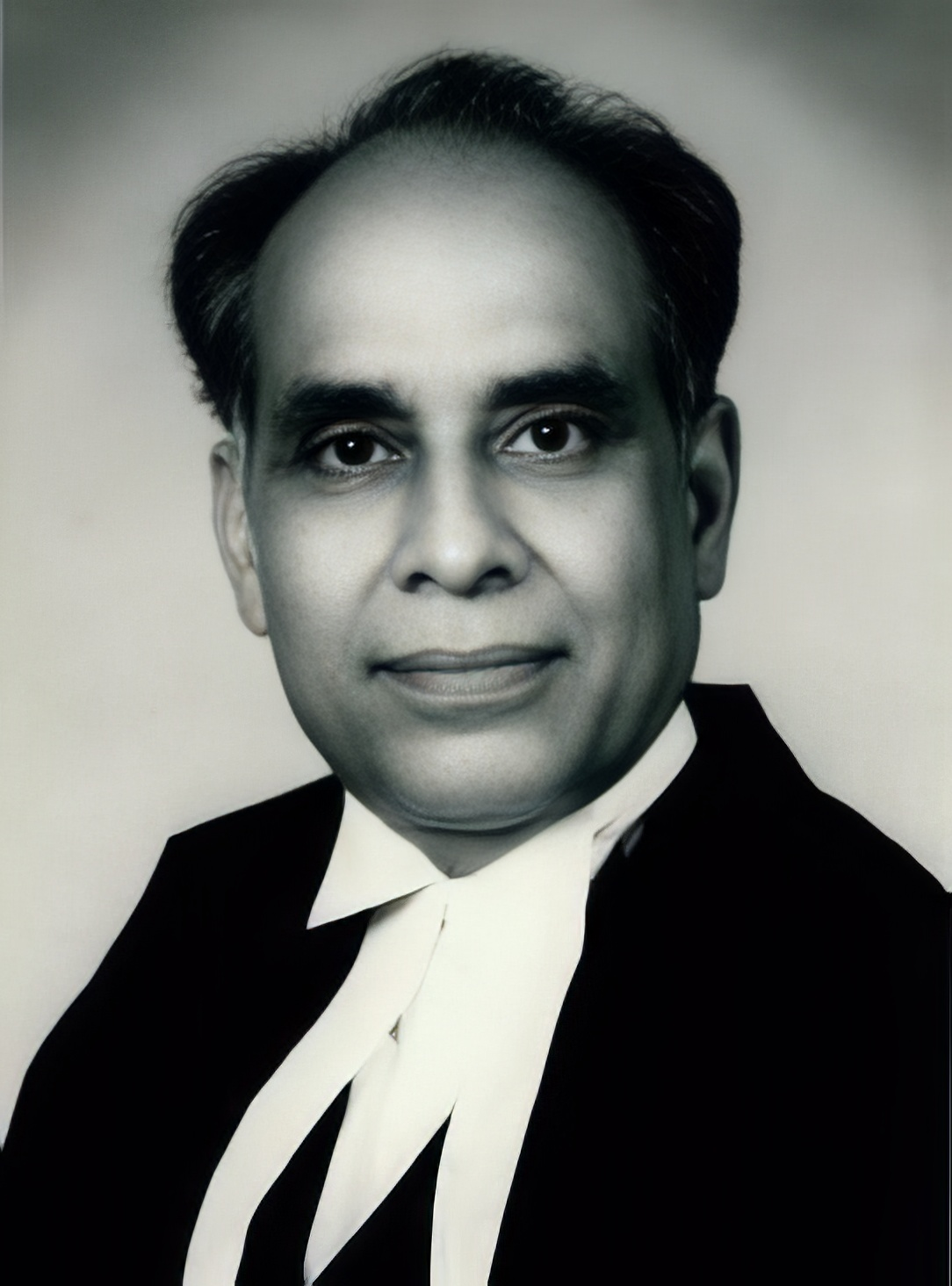
Nominee	Zail Singh	Hans Raj Khanna
Party	INC(I)	Independent
Home state	Punjab	Punjab
Electoral vote	754,113	282,685
Percentage	72.73%	27.27%
President before election
Neelam Sanjiva Reddy
JP
Elected President
Zail Singh
INC(I)

The Election Commission of India held indirect eighth presidential elections of India on 12 July 1982. Zail Singh with 754,113 votes won over his nearest rival Hans Raj Khanna who got 282,685 votes. Zail Singh was the first and till date only Sikh to be the President of India.

== Candidates ==
Potential opposition candidates included N. G. Goray former high commissioner to London, and Bhola Paswan Shastri, former Rajya Sabha member.

== Schedule ==
The election schedule was announced by the Election Commission of India on 9 June 1982.

S.No.	Poll Event	Date
1.	Last Date for filing nomination	23 June 1982
2.	Date for Scrutiny of nomination	24 June 1982
3.	Last Date for Withdrawal of nomination	26 June 1982
4.	Date of Poll	12 July 1982
5.	Date of Counting	15 July 1982

== Results ==
Source: Web archive of Election Commission of India website

Candidate	Electoral Values
Zail Singh	754,113
Hans Raj Khanna	282,685
Total	1,036,798

== See also ==
- 1979 Indian vice presidential election
