= United Opposition (India) =

Indian political alliance, 2022–2023

- Abbreviation: UO
- Founded: 2022
- Dissolved: 2023
- Succeeded by: Indian National Developmental Inclusive Alliance (INDIA)
- Ideology: Secularism; Social democracy; Big tent
- Political position: Centre-left to left-wing
- Seats in Rajya Sabha: 92 / 245
- Seats in Lok Sabha: 121 / 543
- Seats in State Legislative Assemblies: 1,619 / 4,036

The United Opposition was an electoral alliance formed between various opposition parties in India ahead of the 2022 elections in India. The United Opposition was first proposed by the former Chief Minister of West Bengal, Mamata Banerjee.

== Foundation ==
To fight against NDA in 2022 Indian presidential election, the Chief Minister of West Bengal, TMC supremo, Mamata Banerjee proposed an electoral alliance.

== Member parties ==
| Party (Note: The member party's MPs, MLAs and ECI recognition is added according to July, 2022) | MPs in Lok Sabha | MPs in Rajya Sabha | MLAs | Base State |
|---|---|---|---|---|
| Indian National Congress (INC) | 53 | 36 | 692 | National Party |
| Communist Party of India (Marxist) (CPIM) | 4 | 5 | 87 | National Party |
| Communist Party of India (CPI) | 2 | 2 | 21 | National Party |
| Nationalist Congress Party (NCP) | 5 | 4 | 58 | National Party |
| All India Trinamool Congress (AITC) | 23 | 13 | 233 | National Party |
| Aam Aadmi Party | 1 | 10 | 156 | Delhi, Punjab, Goa |
| Dravida Munnetra Kazhagam (DMK) | 24 | 10 | 139 | Tamil Nadu, Puducherry |
| Samajwadi Party (SP) | 3 | 3 | 112 | Uttar Pradesh |
| Indian Union Muslim League (IUML) | 3 | 1 | 15 | Kerala |
| Jammu & Kashmir National Conference (JKNC) | 3 | — | — | Jammu and Kashmir |
| Viduthalai Chiruthaigal Katchi (VCK) | 1 | — | 4 | Tamil Nadu |
| Revolutionary Socialist Party (RSP) | 1 | — | — | Kerala, West Bengal |
| Shiv Sena (Uddhav Balasaheb Thackeray) (SS(UBT)) | 5 | 1 | 16 | Maharashtra |
| Rashtriya Janata Dal (RJD) | — | 6 | 80 | Bihar |
| Rashtriya Lok Dal (RLD) | — | 1 | 9 | Uttar Pradesh |
| Marumalarchi Dravida Munnetra Kazhagam (MDMK) | — | 1 | — | Unrecognised |
| Communist Party of India (Marxist–Leninist) Liberation (CPIML) | — | 0 | 13 | Bihar |
| Total | 121 | 92 | 1619 | India |

== 2022 Presidential elections ==
The United Opposition nominated Yashwant Sinha, former External Affairs Minister, former Finance Minister, and Trinamool Congress leader, as their presidential candidate for the 2022 Indian presidential election. Later Jharkhand Mukti Morcha (JMM), Bahujan Samaj Party (BSP), Telugu Desam Party (TDP) and both factions of Shiv Sena (SS) supported the NDA nominated candidate Droupadi Murmu for the presidential election instead. Sinha finished in second place in the elections.

| Name | Born | Current or previous positions | Home state | Date announced | Result | Ref. |
|---|---|---|---|---|---|---|
| Yashwant Sinha | 6 November 1937 (age 89); Patna, Bihar | External Affairs Minister of India (2002-2004); Leader of the House (Rajya Sabha) (1990-1991); Finance Minister of India (1990-1991, 1998-2002); Member of Parliament, Lok Sabha from Hazaribagh (1998-2004, 2009-14); Member of Parliament, Rajya Sabha from Jharkhand (2004-2009); Member of Parliament, Rajya Sabha from Bihar (1988-1994) | Jharkhand | 21 June 2022 | Lost with 35.97% votes against Droupadi Murmu with 64.03% | |

== 2022 Vice Presidential election ==
The United Opposition nominated Margaret Alva, former Governor of Uttarakhand and Rajasthan, former Union Minister and Congress leader, as their Vice Presidential candidate for the 2022 Indian Vice Presidential election. However, the leading party of the Opposition, AITC, decided to abstain from voting due to insult of the dignity of the party by other parties as they did not consult or seek consent before declaring a VP candidate. Alva finished in second place in the elections.

| Name | Born | Positions held | Home state | Date announced | Result | Ref. |
|---|---|---|---|---|---|---|
| Margaret Alva | 14 April 1942 (age 84); Mangalore, Karnataka | Rajya Sabha MP from Karnataka (1974-1998); MP from Kanara (1999-2004); Governor of Rajasthan (2012-2014); Governor of Uttarakhand (2009-2012); Governor of Gujarat and Governor of Goa (2014) | Karnataka | 17 July 2022 | Lost with 25.63% votes against Jagdeep Dhankhar with 74.37% | |

== See also ==
- Indian National Developmental Inclusive Alliance
- United Progressive Alliance
