= Electoral College (India) =

Electorate for the president of India

The President of India is indirectly elected with instant-runoff voting (Note: The Constitution of 1950 use the term Single transferable vote, which is now used for a system with multiple-member constituencies. When there is only one of the latter, the system is now called Instant-runoff voting) by means of an electoral college consisting of the elected members of the Parliament of India and the legislative assemblies of the states and union territories of India. The number and value of votes are based on the population in 1971 rather than the current population, as a result of the 42nd Amendment, and extended by the 84th Amendment, with the intention to encourage family planning programs in the states by ensuring that states are not penalised for lowering their population growth and development.

The Vice-President is elected by a different electoral college, consisting of members (elected as well as nominated) of the Lok Sabha and Rajya Sabha.

== Composition ==
The presidential electoral college is made up of the following:

- elected members of the Rajya Sabha (upper house of the Parliament of India);
- elected members of the Lok Sabha (lower house of the Parliament of India);
- elected members of each state's Legislative Assembly (lower house of the state legislature);
- elected members of legislative assembly of Union Territories of Jammu-Kashmir, Delhi and Puducherry

== Weighing of votes ==
The value of votes cast by elected members of the state legislative assemblies and both houses of parliament are determined by the provisions of article 55(2) of the Constitution of India. The details of number of voters and votes for the presidential election are given below. As per the 84th Amendment, the 1971 census is used, and will continue to be used until 2026.

The formula for determining the number of votes held by an MLA is:

$\mbox{Value of an MLA vote} = \cfrac {\mbox{Total population of the state or union territory}} {\mbox{Total number of elected members of the State Legislative Assembly} \times {1000}}$

That is, the average constituency size, determined by the 1971 census, in the state or union territory, divided by 1,000.

The number of votes for MLAs are as follows:

Name of the State/Union Territory	Number of State Legislative Assembly seats (elective)	Population (1971 Census)^{†}	Value of the vote of each MLA	Total value of votes for the State/Union Territory
Andhra Pradesh	175	27,800,586	159	27,825
Arunachal Pradesh	60	467,511	8	480
Assam	126	14,625,152	116	14,616
Bihar	243	42,126,236	173	42,039
Chhattisgarh	90	11,637,494	129	11,610
Delhi	70	4,065,698	58	4,060
Goa	40	795,120	20	800
Gujarat	182	26,697,475	147	26,754
Haryana	90	10,036,808	112	10,080
Himachal Pradesh	68	3,460,434	51	3,468
Jammu and Kashmir	90	45,11,341	50	4,500
Jharkhand	81	14,227,133	176	14,256
Karnataka	224	29,299,014	131	29,344
Kerala	140	21,347,375	152	21,280
Madhya Pradesh	230	30,016,625	131	30,130
Maharashtra	288	50,412,235	175	50,400
Manipur	60	1,072,753	18	1,080
Meghalaya	60	1,011,699	17	1,020
Mizoram	40	332,390	8	320
Nagaland	60	516,499	9	540
Odisha	147	21,944,615	149	21,903
Puducherry	30	471,707	16	480
Punjab	117	13,551,060	116	13,572
Rajasthan	200	25,765,806	129	25,800
Sikkim	32	209,843	7	224
Tamil Nadu	234	41,199,168	176	41,184
Telangana	119	15,702,122	132	15,708
Tripura	60	1,556,342	26	1,560
Uttar Pradesh	403	83,849,905	208	83,824
Uttarakhand	70	4,491,239	64	4,480
West Bengal	294	44,312,011	151	44,394
Total	4,123	547,513,396		547,731

Note:- ^{†}http://eci.nic.in/eci_main/ElectoralLaws/HandBooks/President_Election_08062017.pdf.

The value of an MP's vote is calculated by dividing the total value of all MLAs' votes by the number of MPs. The formula for determining the number of votes held by an MP is:

$\mbox{Value of an MP vote} = \cfrac {\mbox{The sum of vote value of elected members of all the State Legislative Assemblies}} {\mbox{The sum of elected members of both the houses of Parliament}}$

That is, the total Members of Parliament (Elected) = Lok Sabha (543) + Rajya Sabha (233) = 776

Value of each MP vote = 547,731 / 776 = 706 (to the nearest integer)
Total value of votes of MPs = 776 × 706 = 547,856

The number of votes for MPs are as follows:

Total number of votes for presidential electors are as follows:

Elector	Total number of electors	Total value of votes
Members of Legislative Assemblies (elected)	4,123	547,731
Members of Parliament (elected)	776	547,856
Total	4899	1,095,587
