= Vice President Radhakrishnan =

Vice President Radhakrishnan may refer to:

- Sarvepalli Radhakrishnan, 1st Vice President of India from 1952 to 1962
- C. P. Radhakrishnan, 15th Vice President of India from 2025 onwards
