= Jagdeep Dhankhar =

Vice President of India from 2022 to 2025

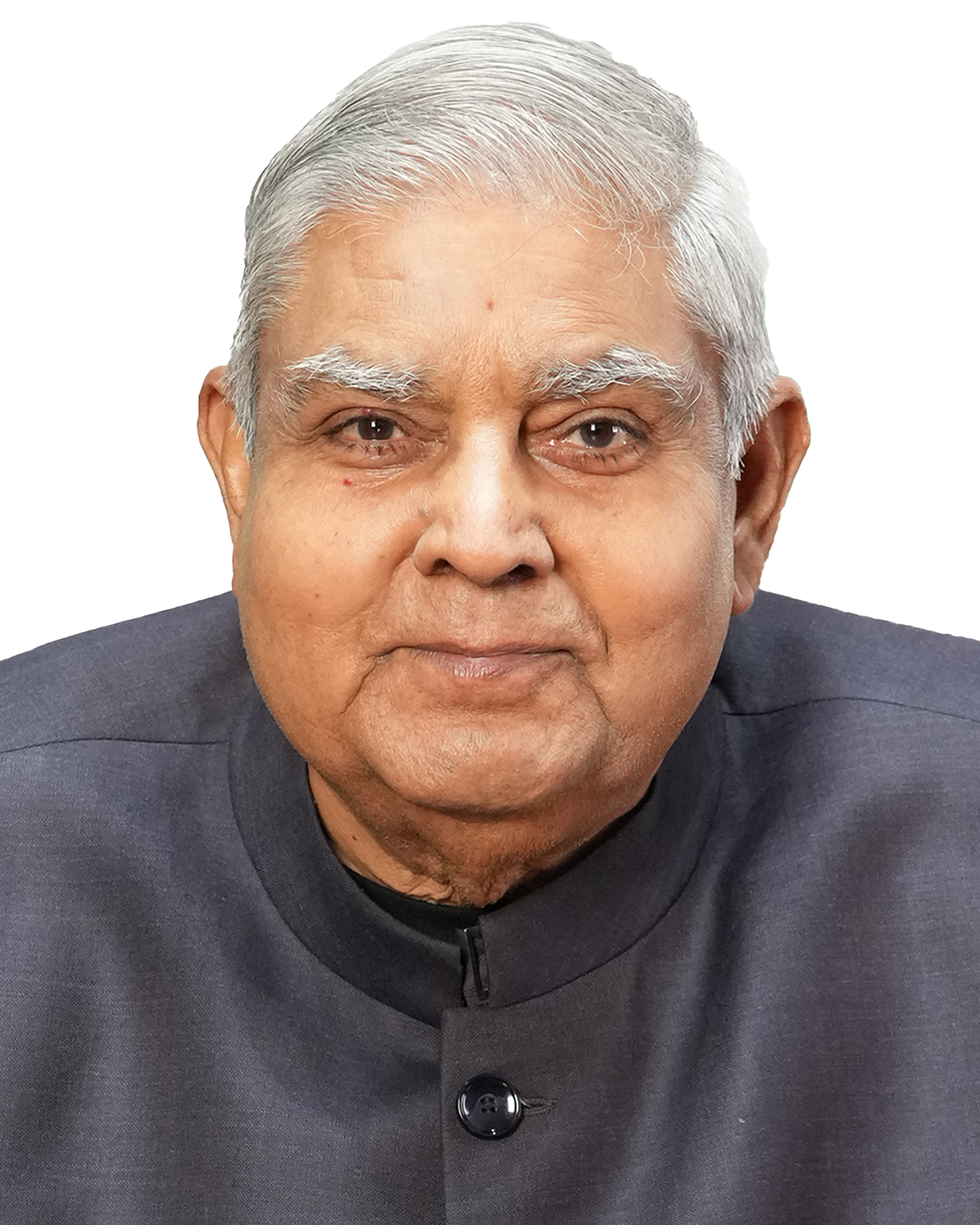
- Official portrait, 2024

Vice President of India
- In office 11 August 2022 – 21 July 2025
- President: Droupadi Murmu
- Prime Minister: Narendra Modi
- Preceded by: M. Venkaiah Naidu
- Succeeded by: C. P. Radhakrishnan

32nd Governor of West Bengal
- In office 30 July 2019 – 18 July 2022
- Chief Minister: Mamata Banerjee
- Preceded by: Keshari Nath Tripathi
- Succeeded by: La. Ganesan (additional charge)

Union Minister of State for Parliamentary Affairs
- In office 21 November 1990 – 21 June 1991
- Minister: Satya Prakash Malaviya
- Preceded by: P. Namgyal
- Succeeded by: R. K. Kumar

Member of Rajasthan Legislative Assembly
- In office 4 December 1993 – 29 November 1998
- Speaker: Hari Shankar Bhabhra; Shanti Lal Chaplot
- Preceded by: Jagjeet Singh
- Succeeded by: Nathu Ram
- Constituency: Kishangarh

Member of Parliament, Lok Sabha
- In office 2 December 1989 – 21 June 1991
- Speaker: Rabi Ray
- Preceded by: Mohd. Ayub Khan
- Succeeded by: Mohd. Ayub Khan
- Constituency: Jhunjhunu, Rajasthan

Personal details
- Born: 18 May 1951 (age 75) Kithana, Rajasthan, India
- Citizenship: Indian
- Party: Bharatiya Janata Party
- Other political affiliations: Indian National Congress (1991–2003); Janata Dal (until 1991)
- Spouse: Sudesh Dhankhar (m. 1979)
- Children: 1
- Education: University of Rajasthan (B.Sc, LLB)
- Profession: Lawyer; Politician

Jagdeep Dhankhar (Hindi pronunciation: [d͡ʒəgˈd̪iːp d̪ʱən.kʰəɽ]; born 18 May 1951) is an Indian politician and lawyer who served as the vice president of India from 2022 to 2025. He previously served as the Governor of West Bengal from 2019 to 2022. He also served as a Union Minister of State for Parliamentary Affairs in the Chandra Shekhar ministry from 1990 to 1991, and served as a member of Lok Sabha from 1989 to 1991. Between 1993 and 1998, he was a Member of Rajasthan's Legislative Assembly. He has been affiliated with Bharatiya Janata Party (BJP).

== Early life and education ==
Dhankhar was born on 18 May 1951 in Kithana, a village in the Jhunjhunu district of Rajasthan, India, into a Hindu Rajasthani Jat family to Ch. Gokal Chand and Kesari Devi. He completed his school education from Sainik School, Chittorgarh. Dhankhar completed his primary and middle school education from Kithana Government School and Ghardhana Government School respectively. He obtained his B.Sc and LLB from the University of Rajasthan, Jaipur.

== Legal career ==
Dhankhar enrolled as an advocate with the Bar Council of Rajasthan in 1979. He was designated a Senior Advocate by the High Court of Judicature for Rajasthan in 1990 and remained the senior-most designated Senior Advocate in the state until taking the oath as Governor on 30 July 2019.

Since 1990, Dhankhar has practised primarily in constitutional law in the Supreme Court of India. He has appeared in the various high courts of India and has also served a stint as the president of the Rajasthan High Court Bar Association.

In 2016, Dhankhar appeared in the Sutlej River water dispute, representing the state of Haryana in the Supreme Court of India.

== Political career ==
He has previously been a member of the Janata Dal and the Indian National Congress. He represented the Jhunjhunu Lok Sabha constituency in Rajasthan as a member of the Janata Dal during the 9th Lok Sabha from 1989 to 1991.

He joined the Indian National Congress in 1991 and contested the 1991 Indian general election from the Ajmer Lok Sabha constituency, but lost. He was later elected as a Member of the Legislative Assembly from Kishangarh, Rajasthan, serving from 1993 to 1998 in the 10th Legislative Assembly of Rajasthan.

He contested the 1998 Indian general election from the Jhunjhunu Lok Sabha constituency, where he finished in third place.

He joined the BJP in 2003 and was a member of the party's campaign committee for the 2008 assembly elections. In 2016, he headed the BJP's law and legal affairs department.

== Governor of West Bengal (2019–2022) ==
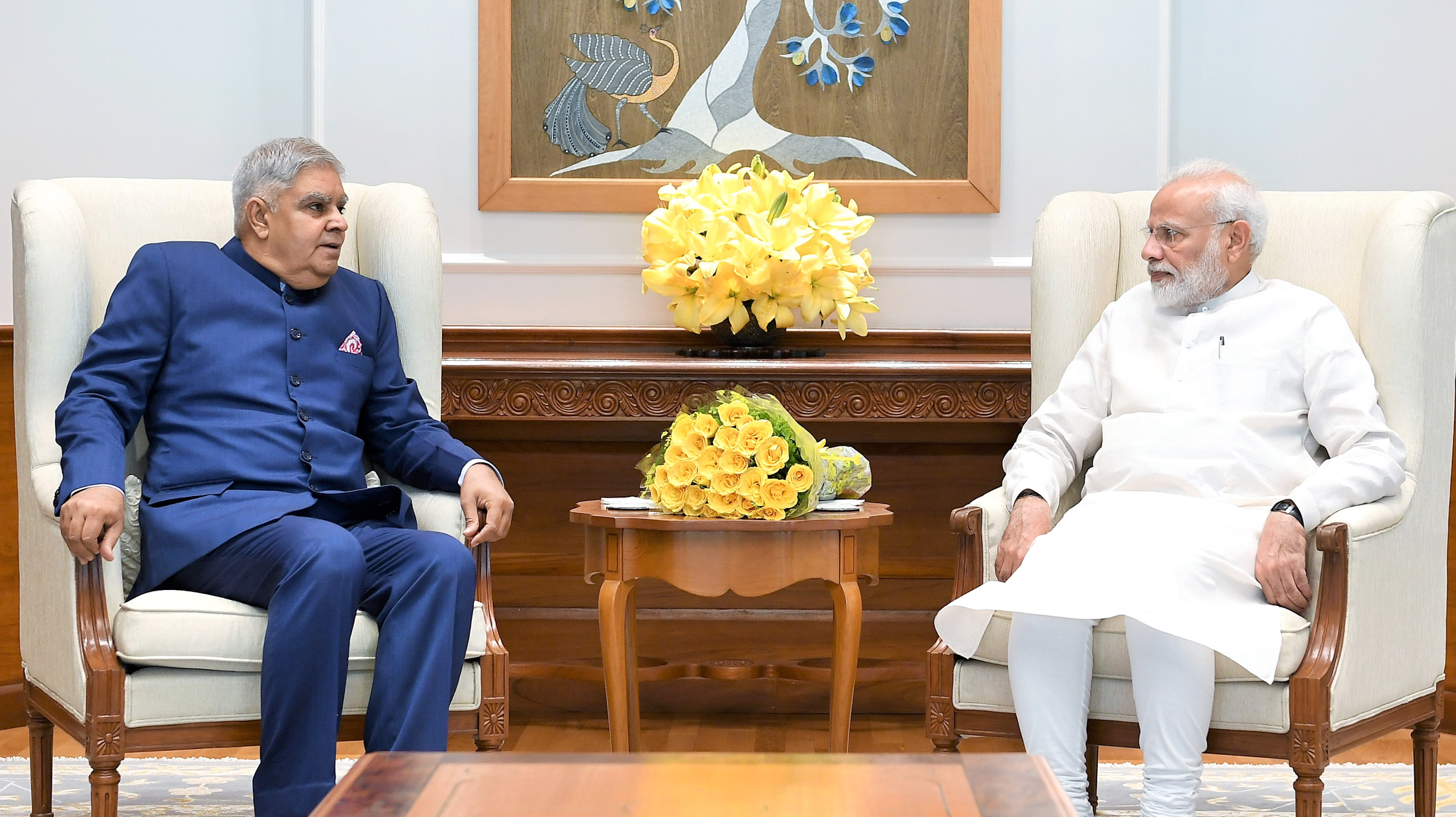
Governor of West Bengal Jagdeep Dhankhar with Prime Minister of India Narendra Modi

On 20 July 2019, the President of India, Ram Nath Kovind, under the directions of the second Modi ministry, appointed him the Governor of West Bengal. He was administered the oath of office on 30 July 2019 at the Raj Bhavan, Kolkata

After becoming the Governor of West Bengal, Dhankhar had several public confrontations with the state government and West Bengal Chief Minister Mamata Banerjee. He was a vocal critic of the third Banerjee ministry, and frequently resorted to Twitter and media to express his views on political issues. In response, the Trinamool Congress dubbed Dhankhar the "real leader of the opposition". In January 2022, CM Banerjee blocked Dhankhar on Twitter, accusing him of mentioning her daily in his tweets and engaging in unethical and abusive behaviour.

On 13 July 2022, Dhankar met with Banerjee, and the Chief Minister of Assam, Himanta Biswa Sharma. Dhankar subsequently visited Delhi on 15 July 2022, and met the Union Home Minister Amit Shah. He resigned as Governor on 17 July 2022, after being nominated as the vice-presidential candidate of the National Democratic Alliance.

== Vice President of India (2022–2025) ==
=== 2022 vice-presidential election ===
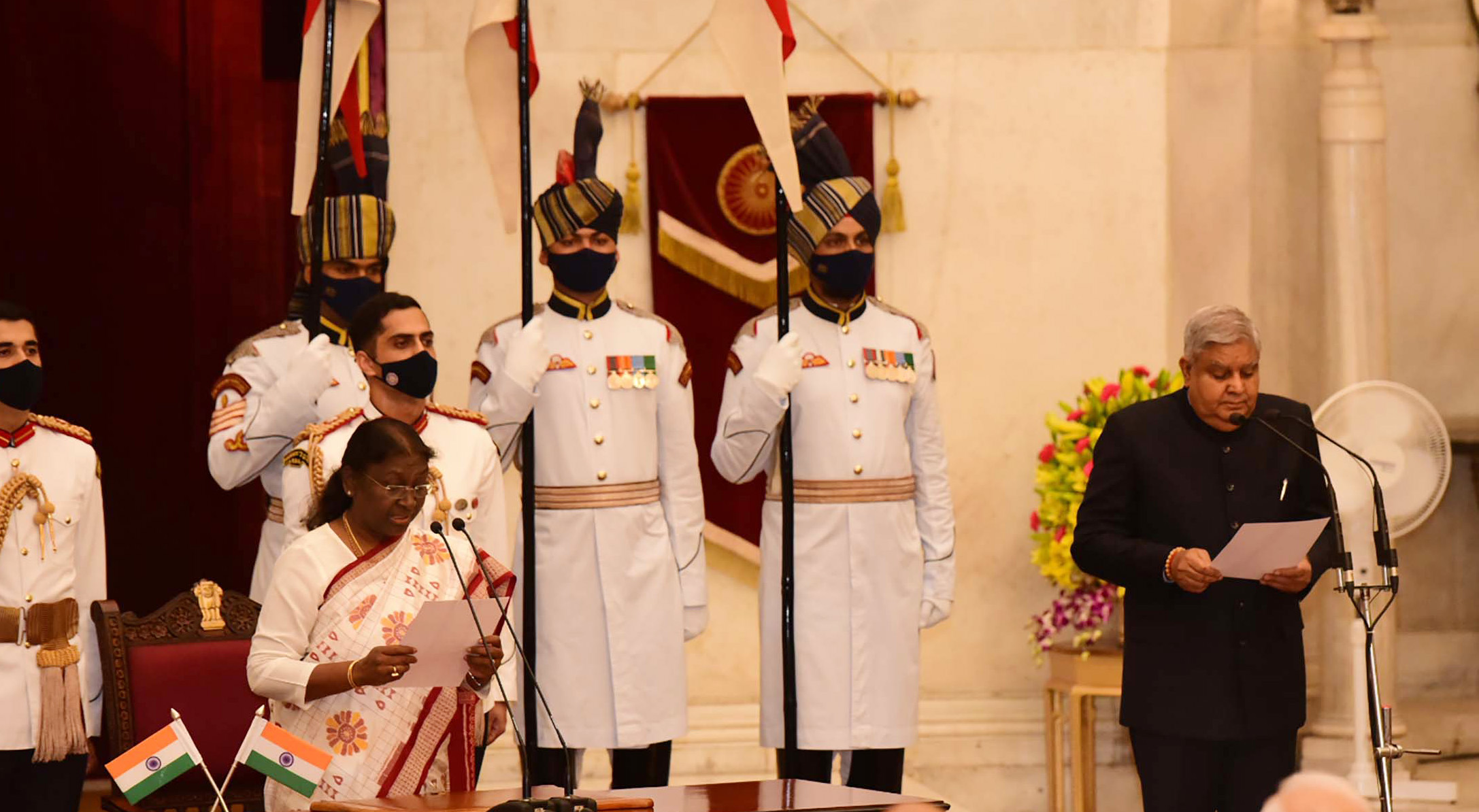
President Droupadi Murmu administering the oath of office to Dhankhar as the 14th Vice President of India

On 16 July 2022, the BJP nominated Dhankhar as the National Democratic Alliance's candidate for Vice President of India for the 2022 election the following month. Dhankhar was projected as a kisan putra (farmer's son) by the BJP. He contested the United Opposition's candidate, Margaret Alva, a former Union Minister and Governor from the Indian National Congress. On 18 July 2022, Dhankhar filed his nomination papers for the vice-president elections. He was accompanied by Prime Minister Narendra Modi and several other union ministers and BJP politicians.

The elections were conducted on 6 August 2022 and votes were counted the same evening. Dhankhar emerged victorious with 528 out of 710 valid votes over opposition candidate Margaret Alva's 182. Trinamool Congress abstained from the election with only two members voting. Dhankhar won the election with 74.37% of the vote, the highest victory margin since the 1992 election.

=== Tenure ===
Dhankar assumed the office on 11 August 2022 succeeding Venkaiah Naidu, with the oath administered by the President of India, Droupadi Murmu at the Rashtrapati Bhavan.

Jagdeep Dhankhar addressed the joint session of both Lok Sabha and Rajya Sabha in the Central Hall of Parliament on September 19, 2023, marking the end of the Indian Parliament's use of the historic building.

On 1 September 2023, Dhankhar christened the frigate INS Mahendragiri.

Referring to India's civilizational history and cultural heritage, Dhankhar underlined that many tourist destinations in the country have a deep connection with Indian history, folk arts and ancient texts. On the occasion of World Tourism Day, Dhankhar described India as a “heaven for tourism” and asked Indians to explore domestic tourist destinations first before looking at international travel.

Dhankhar has advocated for increasing the use of Sanskrit in daily life. Addressing the third convocation of the National Sanskrit University in Tirupati, Dhankhar discussed Sanskrit as a vital part of cultural heritage, describing it as a "cultural anchor" for human civilization. He called for efforts to increase Sanskrit's usage in daily life and emphasised its role in preserving India's cultural heritage.

Dhankhar has also expressed his desire for a balanced approach between the ancient medicinal practices of Ayurveda and Siddha and modern medical sciences.

As chairman of the Rajya Sabha, he reconstituted the panel of Vice-Chairpersons in the 260th session to include 17 women members of the Rajya Sabha when the Rajya Sabha discussed the Nari Shakti Vandan Vidheyak Bill, 2023.

==== No-confidence motion ====
The opposition in the Rajya Sabha often accused Dhankhar of being "biased" and "partisan" in his capacity as chairman of the upper house. On 10 December 2024, the opposition INDIA bloc submitted a notice to move a motion of no confidence against Dhankar. They accused him of indulging in partisanship, alleging that he prevented opposition members from raising issues while allowing BJP members to table issues of their choice. The no-confidence motion was never tabled as the parliamentary session expired during the 14 day mandatory notice period. The BJP decried the attack, stating that Dhankar was being targeted for his peasant origins and Jat background.

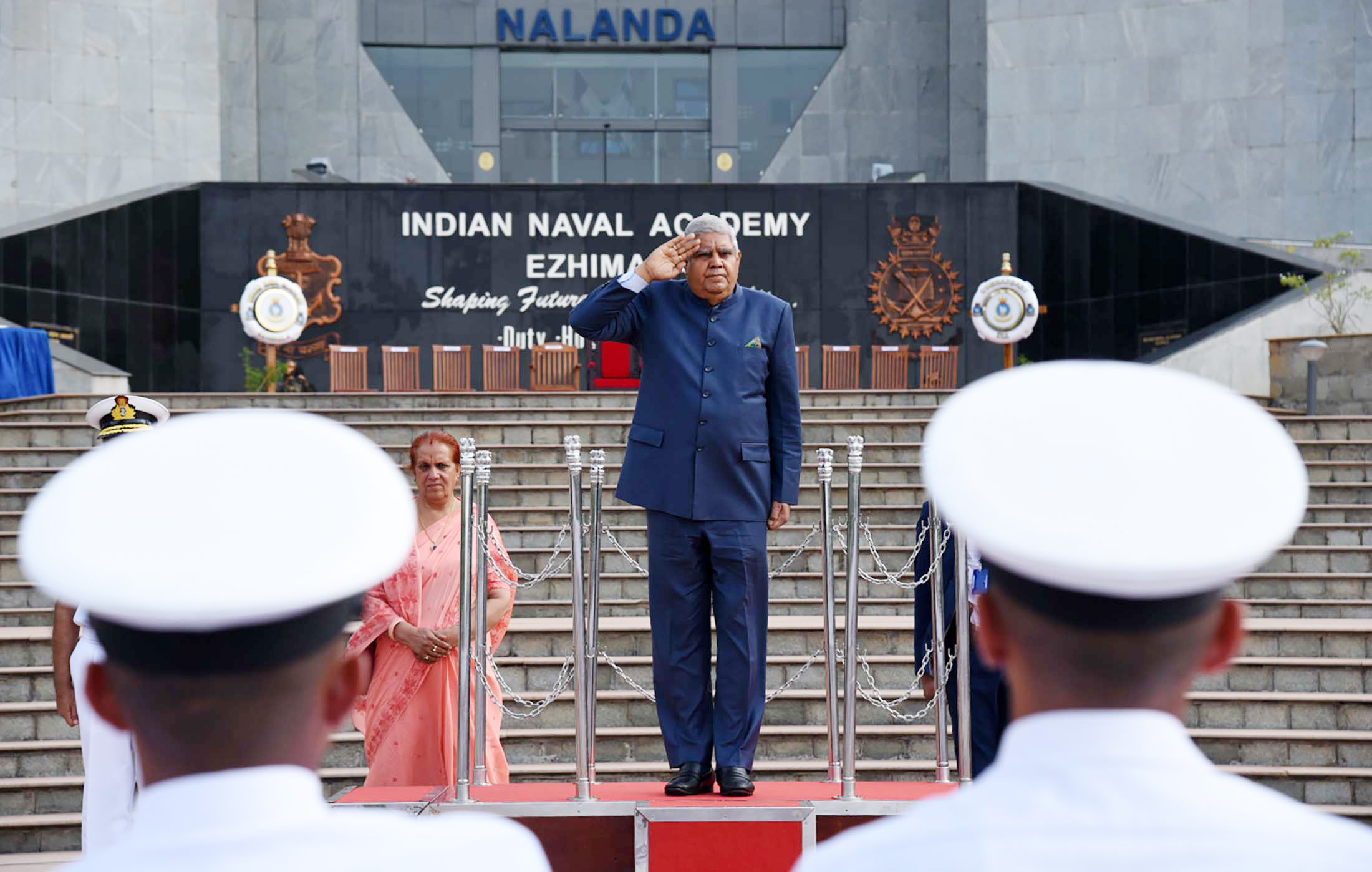
Dhankar inspects the Guard of Honour at the Indian Naval Academy in May 2023

==== Criticism of judiciary ====
Dhankar, a former lawyer, grew increasingly critical of the independence of the Indian judiciary, especially of the Supreme Court. After the Supreme Court struck down the government's attempts to have a part in judicial appointments, Dhankar criticised the decision in his maiden speech to the Rajya Sabha, stating that the actions of the court amounted to judicial encroachment over the powers of the legislature which violated the principle of the separation of powers. He has also been critical of the basic structure doctrine that had been invoked in this case, which enshrines judicial independence. In 2025 the Supreme Court ruled that the actions of Tamil Nadu Governor R. N. Ravi (who is associated with the BJP) in preventing implementation of bills passed by the Legislative Assembly (where the BJP's rival DMK has had the majority since 2021) by first withdrawing assent for three years and then referring them to the President, were unconstitutional, and directed the President to act quickly on the matter, Dhankar criticised the ruling, stating that the Supreme Court was breaking its boundaries and was aiming for 'unchecked power' by sidelining the legislative and executive branches of the government and criticised Article 142 of the Constitution of India (which empowered the Supreme Court to pass such directives) as a "nuclear weapon against democracy available to the judiciary 24×7".

==== Foreign visits ====
Jagdeep Dhankhar's first official foreign visit as vice-president was to Cambodia in November 2022. He represented India at the ASEAN-India Commemorative Summit and the 17th East Asia Summit, marking 70 years of diplomatic relations between India and Cambodia and celebrating the 30th anniversary of India-ASEAN relations during the India-ASEAN Friendship Year.

The vice-president visited the heritage sites of Ta Prohm Temple and Angkor Wat Temple in Siem Reap and examined the restoration and conservation work at these cultural heritage sites, carried out by the Archaeological Survey of India. He inaugurated the Hall of Dancers at the Ta Prohm Temple.

At the invitation of Sheikh Tamim bin Hamad Al Thani, Amir of the State of Qatar, Dhankhar visited Qatar on 20–21 November 2022.

Dhankhar visited London on 5–6 May 2023 to attend the coronation of King Charles III on behalf of the Government of India. This marked the second time that an Indian leader attended a coronation in the United Kingdom, after Prime Minister Jawaharlal Nehru attended the coronation of Queen Elizabeth II in 1953.

Ahead of the coronation, Dhankhar and his wife, Sudesh Dhankhar met King Charles III, United States First Lady Jill Biden, Israeli President Isaac Herzog, Italian President Sergio Mattarella, Brazilian President Luiz Inácio Lula da Silva, and other world leaders during a reception hosted by the king at Buckingham Palace.

On 22 May 2024, Dhankhar visited Iran to attend the official ceremony to pay condolences on the death of President Ebrahim Raisi, Foreign Minister Hossein Amir-Abdollahian, and other officials who died in a helicopter crash on 19 May 2024.

=== Resignation ===
On 21 July 2025, Dhankhar stepped down as Vice President, citing health concerns and stating that he wished to “prioritise health care and follow medical advice.” He became the third vice president to resign before completion of his term, and the first whose resignation triggered a midterm vice presidential election. (Note: His other two predecessors, Varahagiri Venkata Giri and Ramaswamy Venkataraman had resigned a few days before their completion of terms in order to participate in the presidential elections.)

== Electoral performance ==
Indian general election, 1989: Jhunjhunu
Party	Candidate	Votes	%	±%
JD	Jagdeep Dhankhar	421,686	57.7	
INC(I)	Mohammad Ayub Khan	259,705	35.6	
JP	Prithvi Singh	12,737	1.7	
BSP	Ram Pal	2,749	0.4	
Turnout		730,259	64.9	
JD gain from INC(I)		Swing		

Indian general election, 1991: Ajmer
Party	Candidate	Votes	%	±%
BJP	Rasa Singh Rawat	211,676	48.3	
INC(I)	Jagdeep Dhankhar	186,333	42.5	
JD	Syed Zahoor Chisty	7,902	1.8	
Turnout		438,424	45.5	
BJP gain from INC(I)		Swing		

Rajasthan Legislative Assembly election, 1993: Kishangarh
Party	Candidate	Votes	%	±%
INC(I)	Jagdeep Dhankhar	41,444	44.8	
BJP	Jagjeet Singh	39,486	42.7	
Independent	Sadar Subharati Bhai	9,019	9.8	
Turnout		94,476	63.6	
INC(I) gain from BJP		Swing		

Indian general election, 1998: Jhunjhunu
Party	Candidate	Votes	%	±%
All India Indira Congress (Secular)	Sis Ram Ola	338,526	44.25	
BJP	Madan Lal Saini	300,667	39.3	
INC	Jagdeep Dhankhar	94,376	12.34	
Turnout		765,070	67.08	
All India Indira Congress (Secular) gain from BJP		Swing		

Results of the Indian vice-presidential election, 2022
Candidate	Party (Coalition)	Electoral Votes	% of Votes
Jagdeep Dhankhar	BJP (NDA)	528	74.37
Margaret Alva	INC (UO)	182	25.63
Total		710	100
Valid Votes		710	
Invalid Votes		15	
Turnout		725	92.95%
Abstentions		55	7.05%
Electors		780	

== Personal life ==
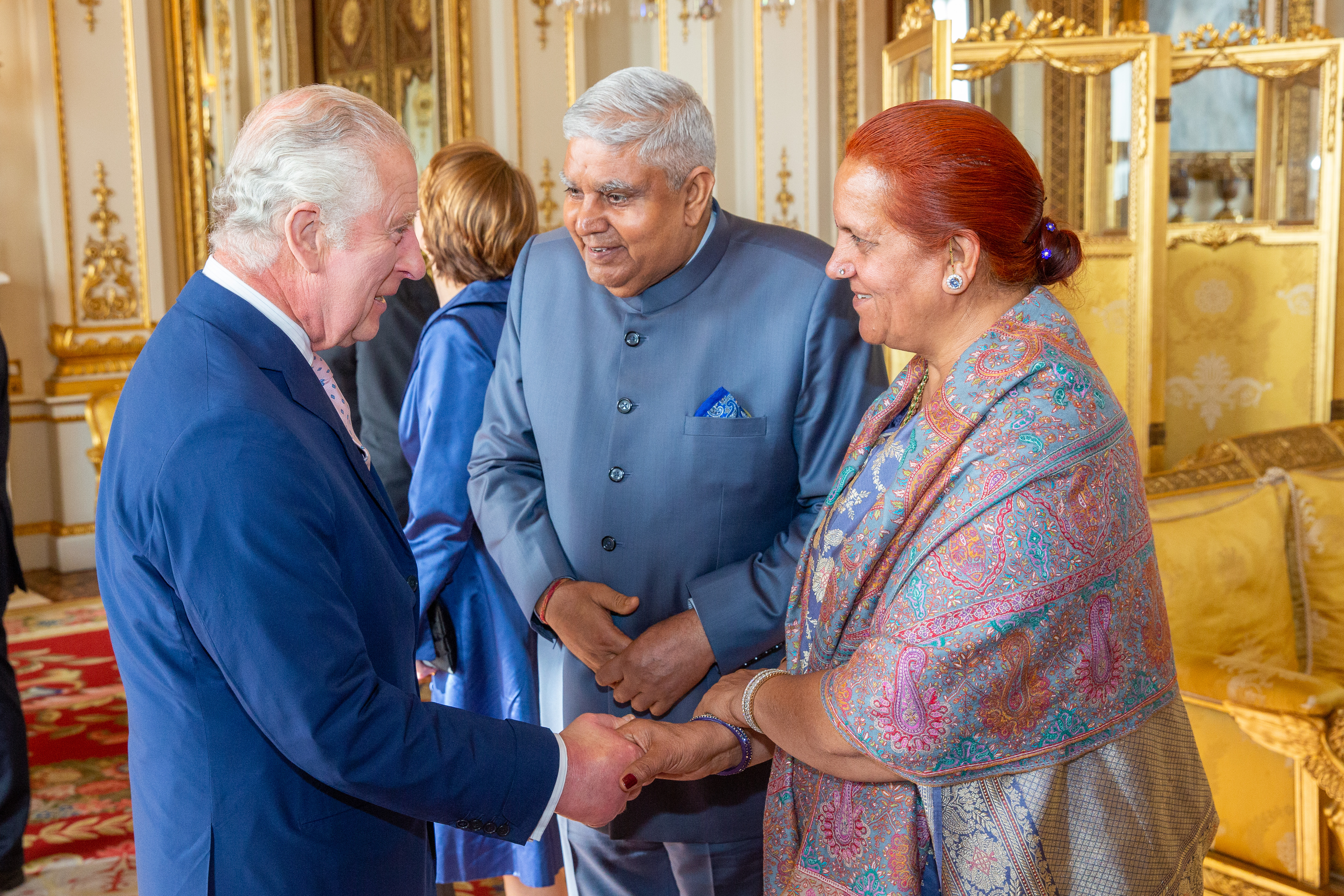
Vice President Jagdeep Dhankhar and Mrs. Sudesh Dhankhar with King Charles III

Dhankhar married Sudesh Dhankhar (born 20 July 1956) in 1979, and they have a daughter, Kamna who is married to Kartikeya Vajpai son of late Shri Vijay Shankar Vajpayee, and Smt. Abha Vajpayee.

Sudesh completed her pre-university course, bachelor's and master's from Banasthali Vidyapith. Between 2013 and 2022, she pursued a PhD in Economics at Banasthali Vidyapith. She presented her thesis on groundwater conservation in Jhunjhunu district and was awarded the degree in 2022. She is actively involved in social work, including initiatives related to water conservation, women's empowerment, and child education.

As Second Lady of India, Sudesh accompanied Dhankhar to the coronation of Charles III.

== See also ==
- List of governors of West Bengal
- 2022 Indian vice presidential election

Lok Sabha
Preceded by Mohd. Ayub Khan	Member of Parliament for Jhunjhunu; 1989–1991	Succeeded by Mohd. Ayub Khan
Rajasthan Legislative Assembly
Preceded by Jagjeet Singh	Member of the Legislative Assembly for Kishangarh; 1993–1998	Succeeded by Nathu Ram
Government offices
Preceded by Keshari Nath Tripathi	Governor of West Bengal; 2019–2022	Succeeded by La. Ganesan; Additional Charge
Preceded by Venkaiah Naidu	Vice President of India; 2022–2025	Succeeded by C. P. Radhakrishnan
