= B. Sudershan Reddy =

Indian judge (born 1946)

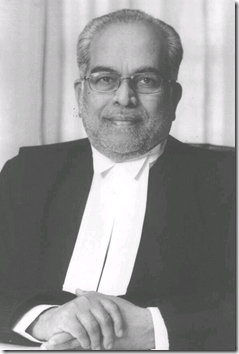
- Official portrait, 2007

Judge of the Supreme Court of India
- In office 12 January 2007 – 7 July 2011
- Nominated by: Yogesh Kumar Sabharwal
- Appointed by: A. P. J. Abdul Kalam

Chief Justice of the Gauhati High Court
- In office 5 December 2005 – 12 January 2007
- Preceded by: Binod Kumar Roy
- Succeeded by: Jasti Chelameswar

Personal details
- Born: Buchireddy Sudershan Reddy; 8 July 1946 (age 80) Akula Mylaram, Ranga Reddy district, Hyderabad State (present–day Telangana), India
- Party: Independent
- Education: Osmania University (LLB)

Buchireddy Sudershan Reddy (born 8 July 1946) is an Indian jurist who served as a judge of the Supreme Court of India from 2007 to 2011. He was the Indian National Developmental Inclusive Alliance (INDIA) candidate for the 2025 vice presidential election, losing to C. P. Radhakrishnan.

== Early life ==
Buchireddy Sudershan Reddy was born on 8 July 1946 in Akula Mylaram, Ranga Reddy district, Andhra Pradesh ( Telangana), in an agricultural family. He studied in Hyderabad and obtained a Bachelor of Laws degree from Osmania University in 1971. He enrolled as an advocate at the Bar Council of Andhra Pradesh the same year.

== Career ==
In his early legal career, he started practice on civil and constitutional matters under K. Pratap Reddy, a senior advocate of the Andhra Pradesh High Court. On 8 August 1988, Reddy was appointed as a government pleader in the High Court and became the additional standing counsel for the Government of India, serving until 1990. In 1993, he was elected as president of the Andhra Pradesh High Court Advocates Association and also served as a legal adviser to Osmania University.

On 2 May 1993, Reddy became a judge of the Andhra Pradesh High Court. In 2005, he was appointed as the chief justice of the Gauhati High Court. Reddy was appointed to the post of judge of the Supreme Court of India on 12 January 2007. He retired on 7 July 2011, with one of his last cases being the influential Salwa Judum case. Following the passage of The Lokpal and Lokayuktas Act, 2013, he became the first Lokayukta of Goa in March 2013. In October 2013, Reddy resigned from the role due to personal reasons.

== 2025 vice presidential election ==
On 19 August 2025, Mallikarjun Kharge, the chairman of the INDIA bloc, announced Reddy as their candidate for the 2025 vice presidential election, following the resignation of Jagdeep Dhankhar. He received the endorsement of the Indian National Congress, among others. He was defeated by the NDA candidate, C.P. Radhakrishnan, by a margin of 152 votes.

== Electoral history ==
Vice President of India
Year	Candidate	Party	Home State	Election		Result
Year	Candidate	Party	Home State	Votes	%	Result
2025	B. Sudershan Reddy	Independent	Telangana	300	39.9%	Lost
