= Ayyalusamy Ramamoorthy =

Ayyalusamy Ramamoorthy is a professor at Florida State University, where he also serves as a scientist with the National High Magnetic Field Laboratory. In 2018, he was elected as a fellow of the Royal Society of Chemistry.

== Early life and education ==
He received a Ph.D. in chemistry from the Indian Institute of Technology, Kanpur in 1990. He is graduated in Chemistry of 1984 batch from V.O.C. Arts & Science College, Tuticorin, Tamil Nadu.

== Career ==
His main area of research is the development of solid-state NMR and its applications to non-soluble, non-crystalline chemical and biological solids. He is known for the development of solid-state NMR methods (such as USEME, PISEMA, PITANSEMA, HIMSELF, etc.) and as a researcher of membrane-associated peptides and proteins, an organizer of international symposia, and author of a book on NMR Spectroscopy of biological solids. He was also involved in the characterization of new nanomaterials. He teaches Chemistry, Biophysics and NMR to undergraduate and graduate students at the University of Michigan.

== Books ==
- NMR Spectroscopy of Biological Solids, 2005, Publisher: CRC Press, ISBN 1-57444-496-4
- Thermotropic Liquid Crystals: Recent Advances (editor), 2007, Publisher: Springer; ISBN 1-4020-5327-4

== Key publications ==
- Brender JR, Lee EL, Cavitt MA, Gafni A, Steel DG, Ramamoorthy A. Amyloid fiber formation and membrane disruption are separate processes localized in two distinct regions of IAPP, the type-2-diabetes-related peptide. J. Am. Chem. Soc. 130 (2008) 6424–6429.
- Xu J, Struppe J, Ramamoorthy A. Two-dimensional homonuclear chemical shift correlation established by the cross-relaxation driven spin diffusion in solids. J. Chem. Phys. 128 (2008) 052308.
- Dürr UHN, Yamamoto K, Im SC, Waskell L, Ramamoorthy A, Solid-State NMR Reveals Structural and Dynamical Properties of a Membrane-Anchored Electron-Carrier Protein, Cytochrome b(5), J. Am. Chem. Soc. 129 (2007) 6670-6671.
- Dürr UHN, Waskell L, Ramamoorthy A. The cytochromes P450 and b5 and their reductases-Promising targets for structural studies by advanced solid-state NMR spectroscopy, Biochim. Biophys. Acta. 1768 (2007) 3235-3259.
- Podsiadlo P, Kaushik AK, Arruda EM, Waas AM, Sup B, Shim, Xu J, Nandivada H, Pumplin BG, Lahann J, Ramamoorthy A, Kotov NA, Ultrastrong and Stiff Layered Polymer Nanocomposites, Science. 318 (2007) 80-83.
- Dürr UHN, Sudheendra US, Ramamoorthy A, LL-37, the only human member of the cathelicidin family of antimicrobial peptides, Biochim. Biophys. Acta 1758 (2006) 1408-1425.
- Dhople V, Krukemeyer A, Ramamoorthy A, The human beta-defensin-3, an antibacterial peptide with multiple biological functions, Biochim. Biophys. Acta 1758 (2006) 1499-1512.
- Dvinskikh SV, Durr U, Yamamoto K, Ramamoorthy A, A high-resolution solid-state NMR approach for the structural studies of bicelles, J. Am. Chem. Soc. 128 (2006) 6326-7.
