= C. P. Radhakrishnan =

Vice President of India since 2025

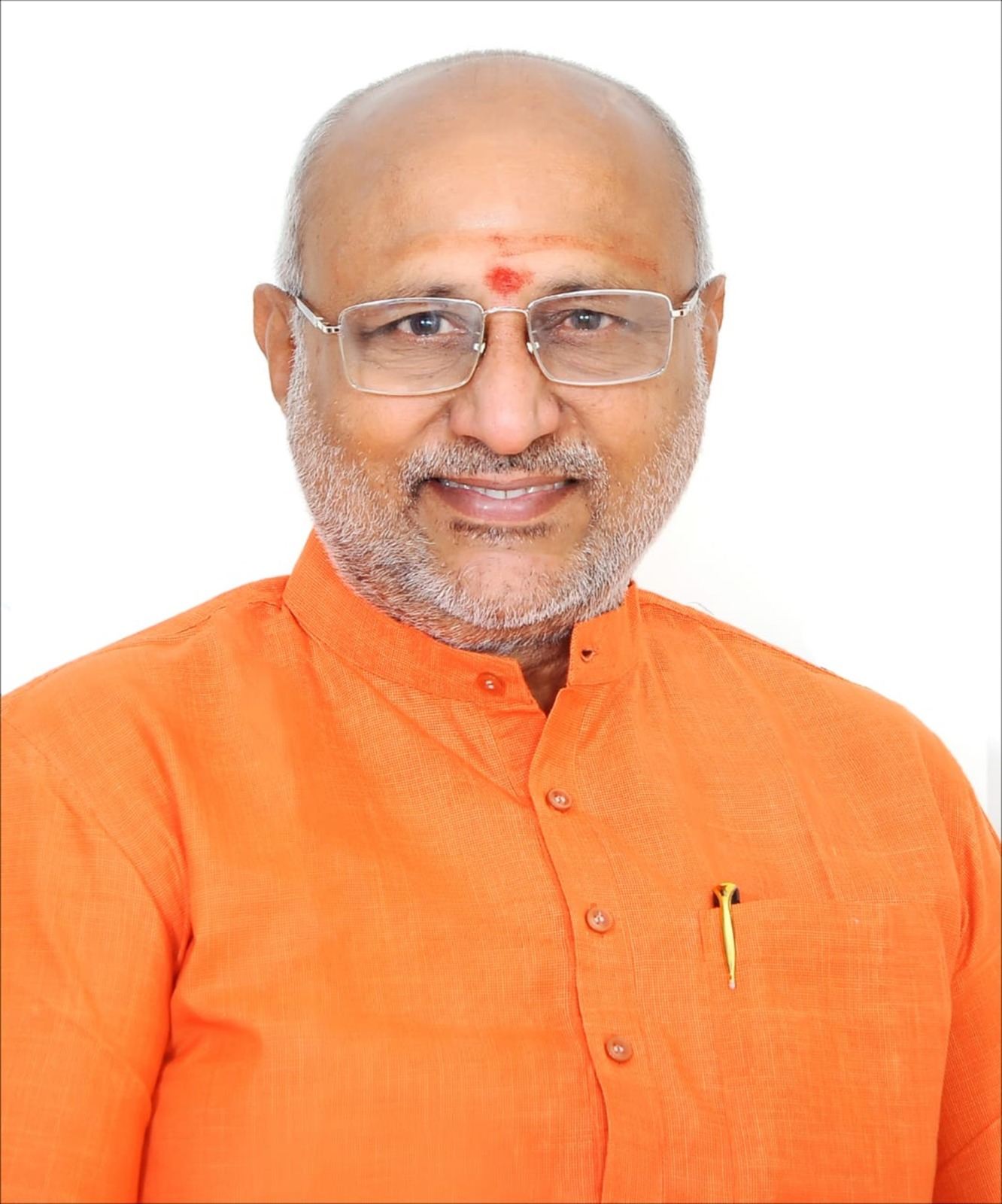
- Official portrait, 2025

Vice President of India
- Incumbent
- Assumed office 12 September 2025
- President: Droupadi Murmu
- Prime Minister: Narendra Modi
- Preceded by: Jagdeep Dhankhar

Governor of Maharashtra
- In office 31 July 2024 – 11 September 2025
- Chief Minister: Devendra Fadnavis
- Preceded by: Ramesh Bais
- Succeeded by: Acharya Devvrat (additional charge)

Governor of Jharkhand
- In office 18 February 2023 – 30 July 2024
- Chief Minister: Hemant Soren; Champai Soren
- Preceded by: Ramesh Bais
- Succeeded by: Santosh Gangwar

Governor of Telangana
- Additional charge
- In office 20 March 2024 – 30 July 2024
- Chief Minister: Anumula Revanth Reddy
- Preceded by: Tamilisai Soundararajan
- Succeeded by: Jishnu Dev Varma

Lieutenant Governor of Puducherry
- Additional charge
- In office 22 March 2024 – 6 August 2024
- Chief Minister: N. Rangaswamy
- Preceded by: Tamilisai Soundararajan
- Succeeded by: Kuniyil Kailashnathan

Member of Parliament, Lok Sabha
- In office 3 March 1998 – 16 May 2004
- Preceded by: M. Ramanathan
- Succeeded by: K. Subbarayan
- Constituency: Coimbatore, Tamil Nadu

State President of Bharatiya Janata Party, Tamil Nadu
- In office 12 May 2003 – 22 September 2006
- Preceded by: S. P. Kirubanidhi
- Succeeded by: La. Ganesan

Personal details
- Born: Chandrapuram Ponnusamy Radhakrishnan; 4 May 1957 (age 69) Tiruppur, Madras State (now Tamil Nadu), India
- Party: Bharatiya Janata Party
- Spouse: R. Sumathi (m. 1985)
- Children: 2
- Education: V. O. Chidambaram College (B.BA)
- Occupation: Businessperson; agriculturalist; politician

Chandrapuram Ponnusamy Radhakrishnan (born 4 May 1957) is an Indian politician who is serving as the 15th Vice President of India since 12 September 2025. He previously served as the Governor of various states, and as a member of parliament in Lok Sabha.

Born in Tiruppur in Tamil Nadu in 1957, Radhakrishnan obtained his Bachelor of Business Administration degree from V. O. Chidambaram College in Thoothukudi. He has been associated with the Rashtriya Swayamsevak Sangh and Bharatiya Jana Sangh since his youth. In 1974, he became part of the Bharatiya Jana Sangh's state executive committee in Tamil Nadu, and later became part of the Bharatiya Janata Party (BJP), when it was founded in 1980. Representing the BJP, Radhakrishnan was elected to the Lok Sabha twice from Coimbatore in the 1998 and 1999 general elections. Since then, he had unsuccessfully contested three general elections from the same constituency in 2004, 2014, and 2019. He served as the state president of the Tamil Nadu unit of the BJP from 2003 to 2006. Radhakrishnan was appointed as the Governor of Jharkhand in February 2023 and served in the position till July 2024. He also held additional charges as the Governor of Telangana and Lieutenant Governor of Puducherry in 2024. He served as the Governor of Maharashtra from July 2024 to September 2025. Following the resignation of the vice president Jagdeep Dhankhar in August 2025, Radhakrishnan was named as the candidate of the National Democratic Alliance for the 2025 Indian vice presidential election. In the elections held on 9 September 2025, he defeated B. Sudarshan Reddy and was sworn in as the vice president on 12 September 2025.

== Early life ==
Radhakrishnan was born on 4 May 1957 to C. K. Ponnusamy and K. Janaki in Tiruppur, Tamil Nadu. He belongs to the Gounder community. He received a Bachelor of Business Administration degree from V. O. Chidambaram College in Thoothukudi. Since the age of 16, he has been associated with the Rashtriya Swayamsevak Sangh and the Bharatiya Jana Sangh.

== Political career ==
In 1974, Radhakrishnan was elected to the Bharatiya Jana Sangh's state executive committee. He joined the Bharatiya Janata Party (BJP) after it was founded in 1980, and became an aide to Atal Bihari Vajpayee.

=== Member of parliament (1998-2004) ===
In the 1998 elections, Radhakrishnan was elected to the Lok Sabha, representing Coimbatore. The election was held in the aftermath of the 1998 Coimbatore bombings. He defeated the Dravida Munnetra Kazhagam (DMK) candidate by a margin of 144,676 votes. He was one of three BJP candidates to win in Tamil Nadu as a part of the party's alliance with the All India Anna Dravida Munnetra Kazhagam (AIADMK). Representing the BJP, he won the 1999 elections from the same constitutency as a part of the DMK-led alliance. He was part of a parliamentary delegation to the United Nations, and addressed the 58th session of the United Nations General Assembly on 20 October 2003. He was a member of the parliamentary committee for public sector undertakings from 1998 to 2004 and a member of the parliamentary consultative committee for finance.

=== Party chief and later years (2005-2022) ===
Ahead of the 2004 general elections, he was among the BJP's state leaders who worked on forming an alliance with the AIADMK in 2004 after the DMK exited from the BJP-led National Democratic Alliance (NDA). His tenure in the Parliament of India ended following his defeat in the 2004 general election to K. Subbarayan of the Communist Party of India. He was appointed as the state president of the Tamil Nadu unit of the BJP in 2004 and served in the position till 2006. As the president, he took a rath yatra for 93 days, advocating the linkage of Indian rivers, eradicating untouchability, and campaigning against terrorism in India. He covered all the parliamentary constituencies of Tamil Nadu during his journey, which faced criticism from the ruling DMK. He was also involved in the organising of the Kerala state unit of the BJP during the late 2000s. In 2012, he faced court arrest in Mettupalayam for protesting inaction against culprits who had assaulted an RSS activist.

Radhakrishnan was announced as the BJP candidate for Coimbatore in the 2014 general elections. He secured second place after polling 389,701 votes, the highest among the BJP candidates in Tamil Nadu. He contested as the party's candidate from the same constituency in the 2019 general election and lost to P. R. Natarajan of the CPIM. He was the chairman of the Coir Board of India, which comes under the Ministry of Micro, Small and Medium Enterprises, from 2016 to 2020. He also served as a member of the BJP's national executive.

=== Governorship (2023–2025) ===
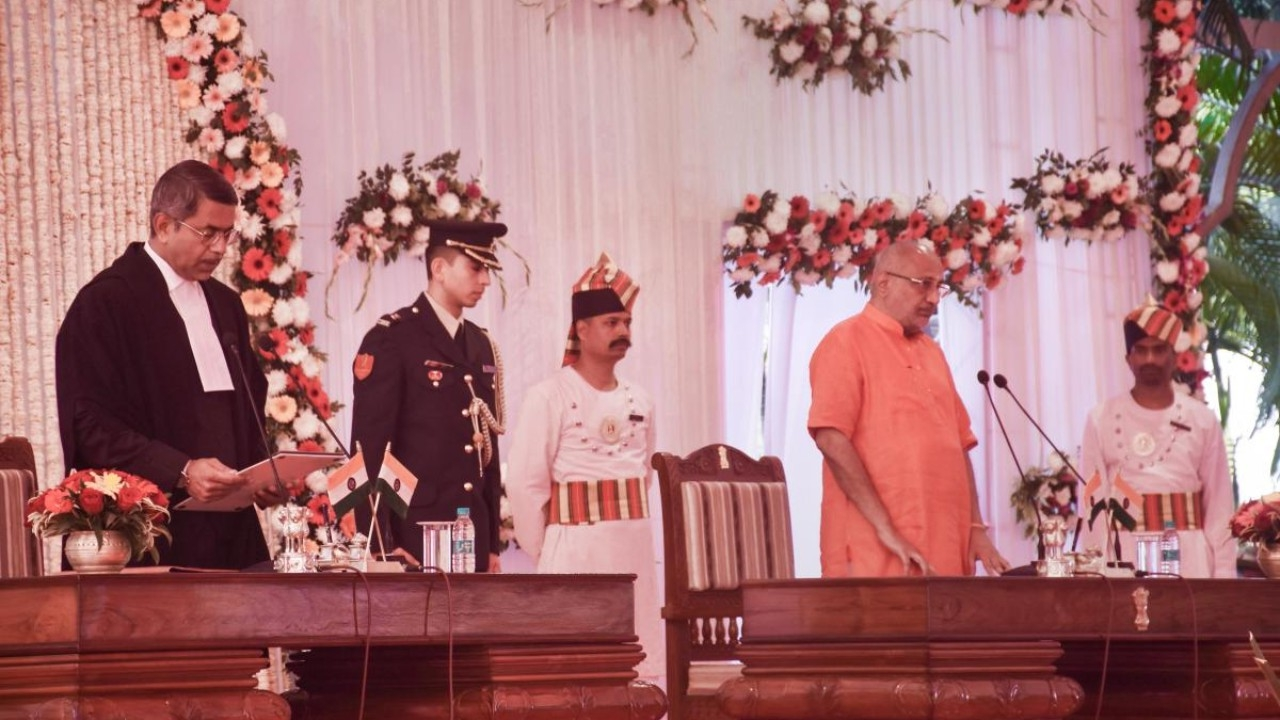
CP Radhakrishnan takes oath as Governor of Jharkhand at Raj Bhavan, Ranchi

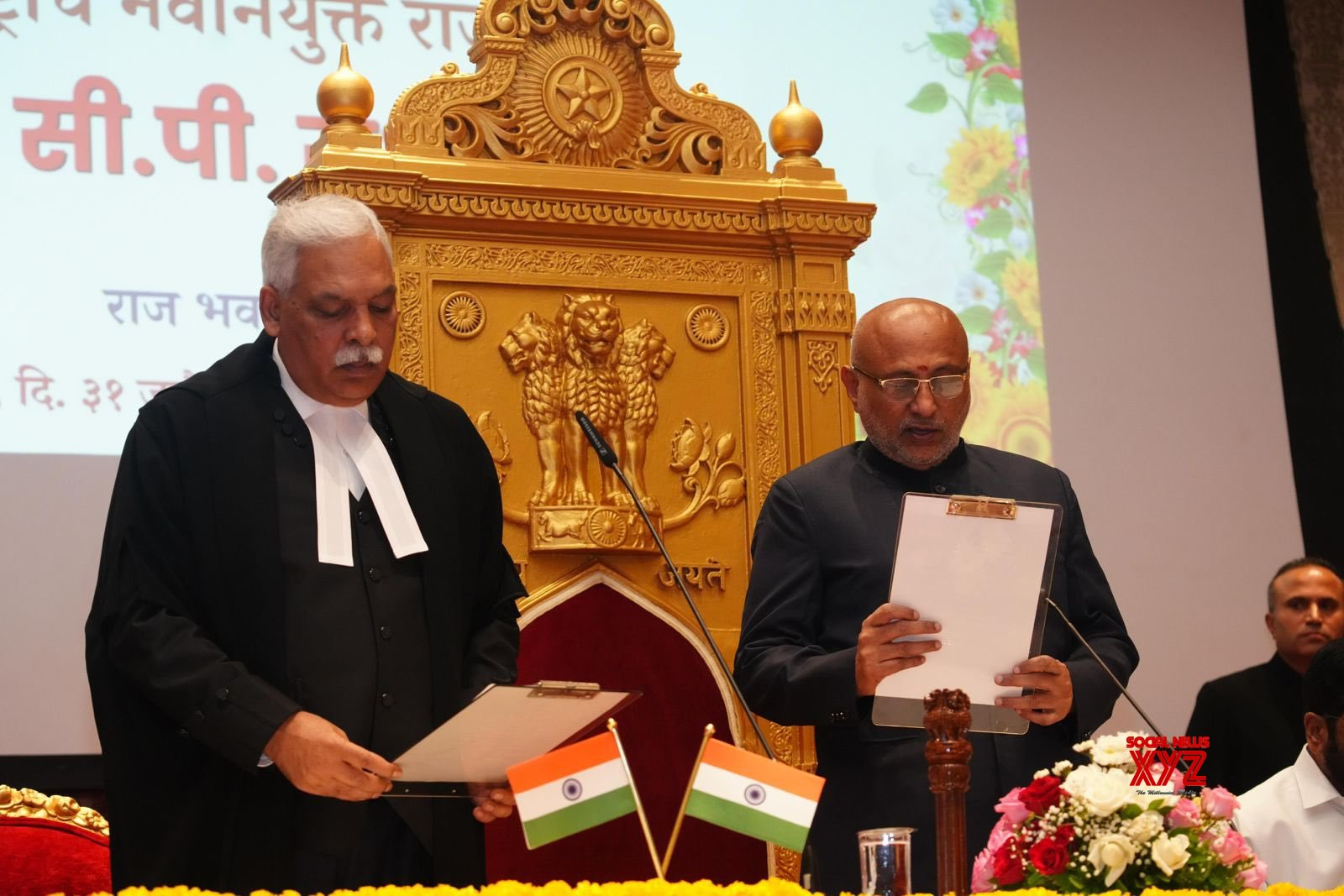
CP Radhakrishnan takes oath as Governor of Maharashtra in presence of Chief Justice of Maharashtra High Court.

On 12 February 2023, president Droupadi Murmu appointed Radhakrishnan as the governor of Jharkhand, succeeding Ramesh Bais, and he took office on 18 February 2023. Following the resignation of Tamilisai Soundararajan, he held additional responsibilities as the governor of Telangana and as lieutenant Governor of Puducherry from 19 March 2024. On 27 July 2024, he was appointed as governor of Maharashtra. Jishnu Dev Varma, Santosh Gangwar, and Kuniyil Kailashnathan, took over his positions in Telangana, Jharkhand, and Puducherry, respectively. Radhakrishnan resigned as governor of Maharashtra following his election as the Vice President of India.

== Vice President of India (2025–present) ==
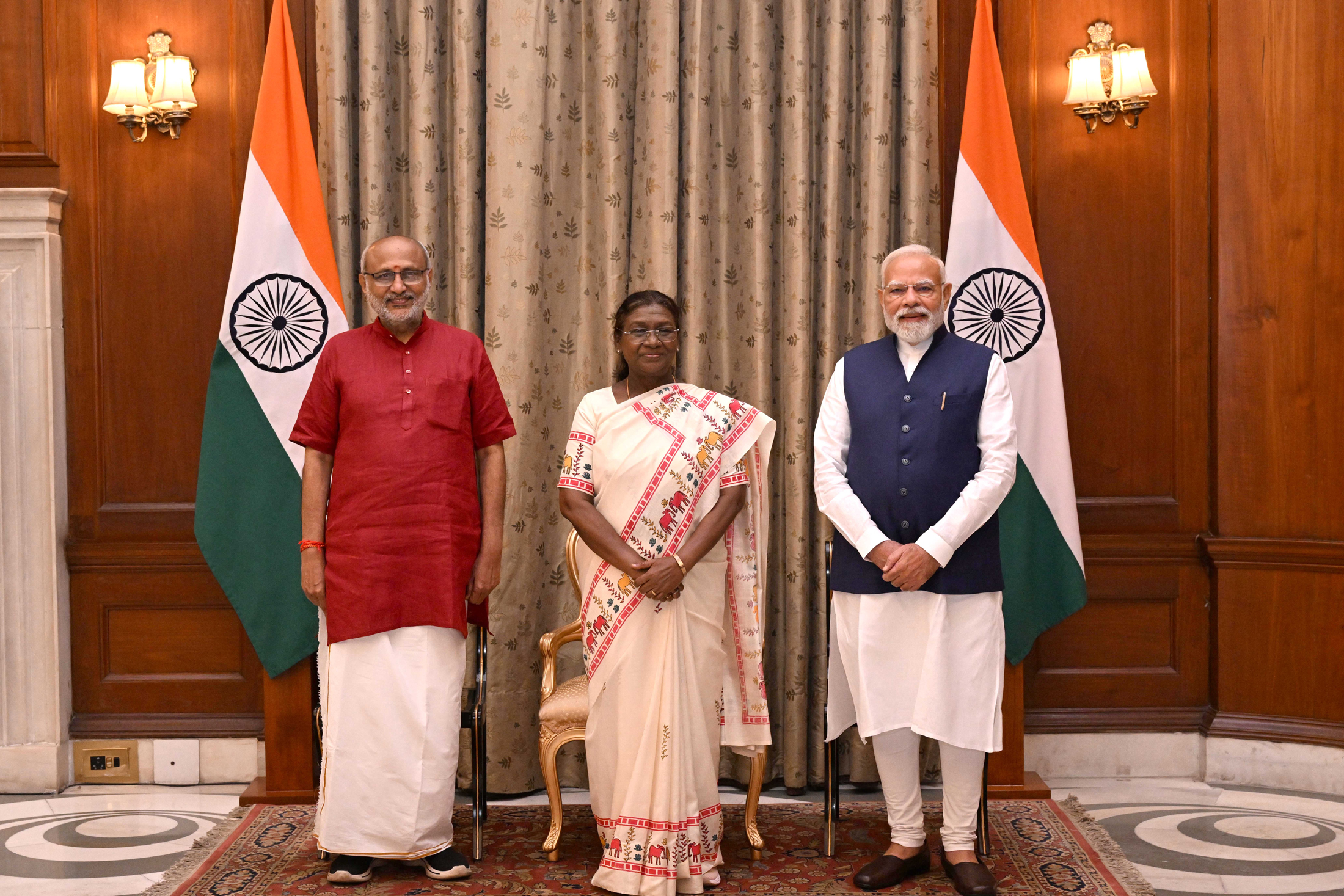
CP Radhakrishnan with President Droupadi Murmu and Prime Minister Narendra Modi after taking the oath of office as the 16th Vice President of India, 2025

On 17 August 2025, following the resignation of the 15th Vice President Jagdeep Dhankhar, BJP national president J. P. Nadda announced Radhakrishnan's candidacy in the 2025 vice presidential election. He was endorsed by all NDA member parties, including the AIADMK, JD(U), NCP, TDP, SS, and non-member parties, such as the YSRCP. He ran against Indian National Developmental Inclusive Alliance (INDIA) candidate B. Sudarshan Reddy. The polling and results for elections were announced on 9 September 2025 and he emerged victorious defeating Reddy by 116 votes. He polled 452 electoral votes. He took oath as the 15th Vice President on 12 September 2025.

Date / Period	Position / Role
1998	Elected to 12th Lok Sabha
1998 - 1999	Member, Twelfth Lok Sabha; Member, Committee on Commerce and its Sub-Committee on Textiles; Member, Committee on Members of Parliament Local Area Development Scheme; Member, Consultative Committee for the Ministry of Finance
1999	Re-elected to 13th Lok Sabha (2nd term)
1999-2000	Member, Committee on Commerce
1999 - 2004	Member, Thirteenth Lok Sabha (second term)
2000-2004	Member, Consultative Committee, Ministry of Finance
May 2000 - Dec. 2002	Convenor, Sub Committee on Textiles of the Committee on Commerce
2001 - 2002	Member, Committee on Public Undertakings
Feb. 2002 - Dec. 2002	Member, Joint Committee on Stock Market Scam and Matters relating thereto
2016- 2020	Chairman, Coir Board, Kochi
18 Feb. 2023 - July 2024	Governor of Jharkhand; Additional Charge as the Governor of Telangana (19 March 2024 - 31 July 2024); Additional Charge as the Lieutenant Governor of Puducherry (19 March 2024 - 6 August 2024)
31 July 2024 - 11 Sept. 2025	Governor of Maharashtra
12 September 2025 onwards	Vice-President of India and ex officio Chairman, Rajya Sabha

== Electoral history ==
=== Vice Presidential elections ===
Elections	Alliance	Result	Vote percentage	Opposition		
Elections	Alliance	Result	Vote percentage	Candidate	Alliance	Vote percentage
2025	NDA	Won	60.1%	B. Sudarshan Reddy	INDIA	39.9%

=== Lok Sabha elections ===
Elections	Lok Sabha	Constituency	Political party	Result	Vote percentage	Opposition		
Elections	Lok Sabha	Constituency	Political party	Result	Vote percentage	Candidate	Political party	Vote percentage
1998	12th	Coimbatore	BJP	Won	55.85%	K. R. Subbian	DMK	37.86%
1999	13th	Coimbatore	BJP	Won	49.21%	R. Nallakannu	CPI	43.02%
2004	14th	Coimbatore	BJP	Lost	38.74%	K. Subbarayan	CPI	57.46%
2014	16th	Coimbatore	BJP	Lost	33.12%	P. Nagarajan	AIADMK	36.69%
2019	17th	Coimbatore	BJP	Lost	31.34%	P. R. Natarajan	CPI(M)	45.66%

== Positions held ==
=== Parliament of India ===
Rajya Sabha

Elections	Position	Term in office		
Elections	Position	Assumed office	Left office	Time in office
2025	Chairman	12 September 2025	Incumbent	1 year, 61 days

Lok Sabha

Elections	Position	Elected constituency	Term in office		
Elections	Position	Elected constituency	Assumed office	Left office	Time in office
1998	Member of Parliament	Coimbatore	23 March 1998	26 April 1999	1 year, 34 days
1999	Member of Parliament	Coimbatore	20 October 1999	6 February 2004	4 years, 109 days

== See also ==
- List of governors of Jharkhand
- List of governors of Maharashtra
- List of governors of Telangana
- List of lieutenant governors of Puducherry
- Vice President of India
- List of vice presidents of India
- Governors of India
- List of Governors of India
- 2025 Indian vice presidential election

Political offices
Preceded by Ramesh Bais	Governor of Jharkhand; 2023–2024	Succeeded by Santosh Kumar Gangwar
Preceded by Tamilisai Soundararajan	Lieutenant Governor of Puducherry; 2024	Succeeded by K. Kailashnathan
Preceded by Tamilisai Soundararajan	Governor of Telangana; 2024	Succeeded by Jishnu Dev Varma
Preceded by Ramesh Bais	Governor of Maharashtra; 2024–2025	Succeeded by Acharya Devvrat
Preceded by Jagdeep Dhankhar	Vice President of India; 2025–present	Incumbent
Lok Sabha
Preceded by M. Ramanathan	Member of Parliament for Coimbatore; 1998–2004	Succeeded by K. Subbarayan
