= 2025 Indian vice presidential election =

- 9 September 2025
- Turnout: 98.21% (▲5.26%)
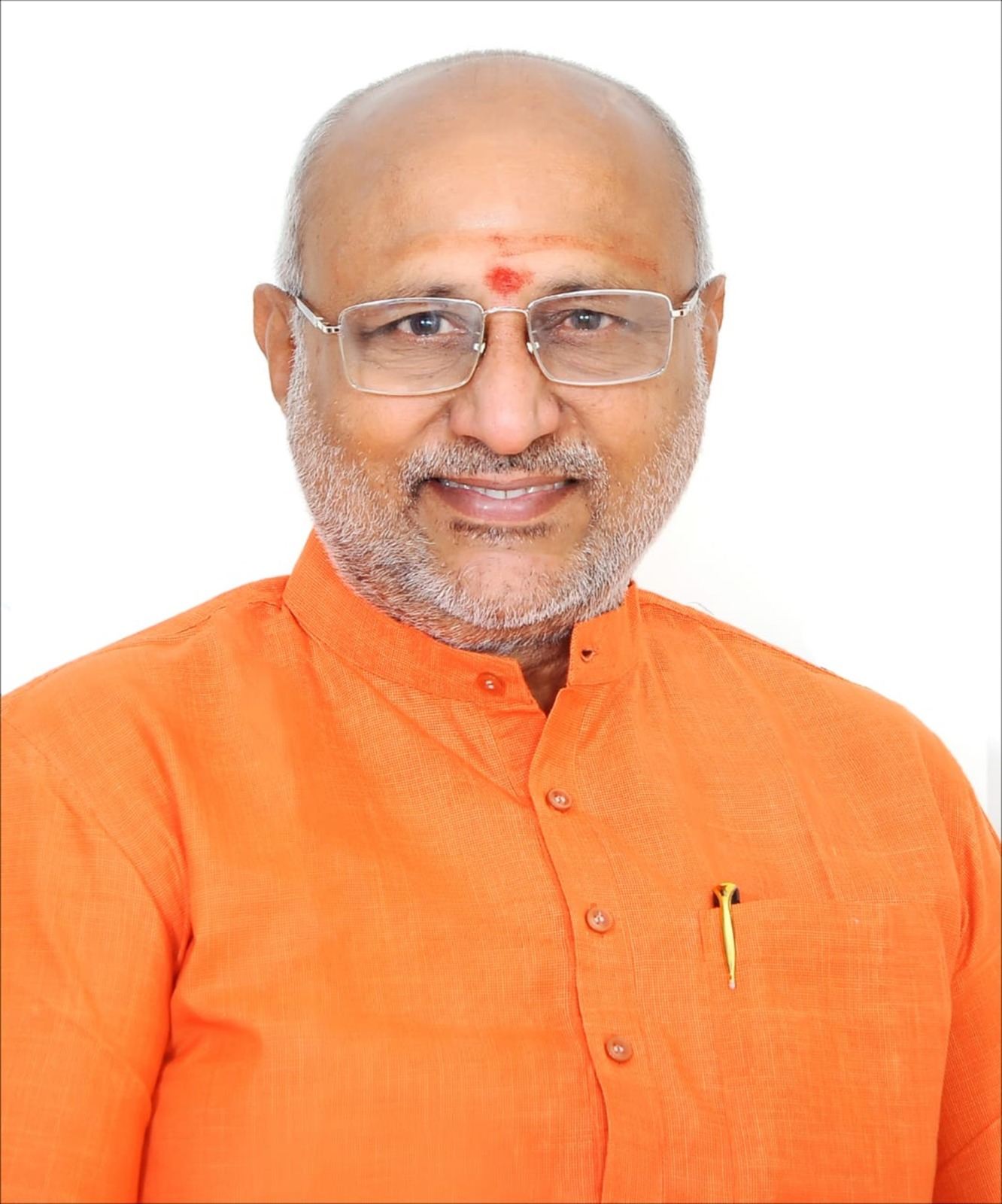

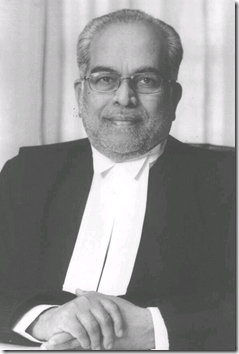
Nominee	C. P. Radhakrishnan	B. Sudershan Reddy
Party	BJP	Independent
Alliance	NDA	INDIA
Home state	Tamil Nadu	Telangana
Electoral vote	452	300
Percentage	60.10%	39.90%
Swing	▼14.27%	▲14.27%
- Vice Presidential Election Results
Vice President before election
Jagdeep Dhankhar
BJP
Elected Vice President
C. P. Radhakrishnan
BJP

Early vice presidential elections were held in India on 9 September 2025 following the resignation of Jagdeep Dhankhar due to health concerns. Article 67 of the Constitution of India provides that the vice president of India shall remain in office for a period of five years. According to Clause 2 of Article 68 of the Constitution, an election to fill a vacancy in the office of the vice president occurring due to his death, resignation or removal, or otherwise shall be held "as soon as possible" from the date of the vacancy. This is the first early election for the office since 1987.

At around 19:30 IST, returning officer Pramod Chandra Mody declared NDA candidate C. P. Radhakrishnan elected. He won by a margin of 152 votes, the narrowest in a vice presidential election since 2002. At least 15 opposition MP's had cross voted in favour of Radhakrishnan. Radhakrishnan got votes more than Reddy in 18 states, while Reddy got in 10 states.

== Electoral system ==
The Vice President is elected by an electoral college which includes members of the Rajya Sabha and of the Lok Sabha using instant-runoff voting. The nominated members of the upper house are also eligible to vote in the election process. Voting is done by secret ballot. A candidate must be a citizen of India, at least 35 years of age, qualified for election to the Rajya Sabha, and not hold any office of profit.

== Election schedule ==
Under sub-section (1) of Section (4) of the Presidential and Vice-Presidential Elections Act 1952, the schedule for the election of the Vice President of India is to be announced by the Election Commission of India; it did so on 1 August. Polling will take place in room number F-101, Vasudha, on the first floor of Parliament House, New Delhi, on 9 September between 10 am and 5 pm.

S.No.	Event	Date	Day
1.	Issue of Election Commission's notification calling the election	7 August 2025	Thursday
2.	Last date for making nominations	21 August 2025	Thursday
3.	Date for the scrutiny of nominations	22 August 2025	Friday
4.	Last date for the withdrawal of candidatures	25 August 2025	Monday
5.	Date on which a poll took place	9 September 2025	Tuesday
6.	Date on which counting took place	9 September 2025	Tuesday

== Electoral college ==
House			
House	NDA	INDIA	Others
Lok Sabha	293 / 542 (54%)	234 / 542 (43%)	15 / 542 (3%)
Rajya Sabha	132 / 239 (55%)	77 / 239 (32%)	30 / 239 (13%)
Total	425 / 781 (54%)	311 / 781 (40%)	45 / 781 (6%)

== Candidates ==
=== National Democratic Alliance ===
Name	Born	Party	Alliance	Positions held	Home state	Date announced	Ref
C. P. Radhakrishnan	20 October 1957 (age 68); Tiruppur, Tamil Nadu	Bharatiya Janata Party	National Democratic Alliance	Governor of Maharashtra (2024–2025); Governor of Jharkhand (2023–2024); Governor of Telangana (additional charge) (2024); Lieutenant Governor of Puducherry (additional charge) (2024); President of Bharatiya Janata Party, Tamil Nadu (2003–2006); Member of Lok Sabha from Coimbatore (1998–2004)	Tamil Nadu	17 August 2025	

=== Indian National Developmental Inclusive Alliance ===
Name	Born	Party	Alliance	Positions held	Home state	Date announced	Ref
B. Sudershan Reddy	8 July 1946 (age 80); Akula Mylaram, Telangana	Independent	Indian National Developmental Inclusive Alliance	Judge of the Supreme Court of India (2007–2011); Chief Justice of the Gauhati High Court (2005–2007); Judge of the Andhra Pradesh High Court (1995–2005)	Telangana	19 August 2025	

== Results ==
Results of the Indian vice-presidential election, 2025
Candidate	Party	Electoral Votes	%
C. P. Radhakrishnan	BJP (NDA)	452	60.10%
B. Sudershan Reddy	Independent (INDIA)	300	39.90%
Total		752	100.00
Valid Votes		752	98.04%
Invalid Votes		15	1.96%
Turnout		767	98.21%
Abstentions		14	1.79%
Electors		781	

== See also ==
- Vice President of India
- 2025 elections in India
- List of Indian vice presidential elections
- List of vice presidents of India
