= V. O. Chidambaram College =

College in Tamil Nadu, India

V. O. Chidambaram College (commonly known as VOC College) is a college of arts and sciences in Tuticorin, (Thoothukudi), a southern city of Tamil Nadu, India. The college, founded by Kulapathi A. P. C. Veerabahu in 1951, has been recognized by UGC under the 12(b) and 2(f). Named in honour of V. O. Chidambaram Pillai, this postgraduate and research centre is affiliated to Manonmaniam Sundaranar University, Tirunelveli. It offers undergraduate courses, postgraduate courses, and research courses. Managed by V. O. Chidambaram Educational Society, the college provides higher education to the economically and gender-wise discriminated sections hailing from the backward areas of southern districts of Tamilnadu, India.

The College is ranked 28th among colleges in India by the National Institutional Ranking Framework (NIRF) in 2024.

== Origin ==
It was in the year 1945, a committee was constituted to commemorate the sacrifice of the first Swadeshi navigator and freedom fighter V. O. Chidambaram Pillai. The following philanthropists were on the committee:

Shri. M. V. Sundaravel (President)

Shri. A. P. C. Veerabahu (Secretary)

Shri. M. Venkatakrishnan (Member)

Shri. M. C. Veerabahu (Member)

Shri. P. Kandasamy (Member)

Of the committee members, M.Venkatakrishnan, M.C.Veerabahu and P.Kandasamy were staunch freedom fighters and their presence in the committee provided a nationalistic perspective to the other members.

The committee first thought of building a monument to the late freedom fighter "Chekkilutha Chemmal", V. O. Chidambaram Pillai and so planned a Town Hall or a big Library. At that moment Dr. A. L. Mudaliar, the then Vice Chancellor of Madras University had appealed to Philanthropists all over Tamil Nadu to start colleges in unrepresented areas. Spurred by this news, himself a graduate Shri. A. P. C. Veerabahu realizing the importance of education in empowering people of "Nava Bharath" mooted the idea of establishing an educational institution for men.

At first, the proposal received a cautious response from the majority of the members of the committee. But it was the veteran freedom fighter and member of the constituent assembly Shri. M. C. Veerabahu who readily appreciated the suggestion of Shri. A. P. C. Veerabahu and offered his full support to establish the educational institution. The other members saw wisdom in his unconditional support and wholeheartedly endorsed and thus came into being V. O. Chidambaram Educational Society constituted by the above-mentioned five luminaries.

In 1946, V. O. Chidambaram Memorial fund raising was begun. This laudable move was blessed by the renowned statesman Chakaravarthi Rajaji. Later V. O. C. Educational society was constituted in 1947 to provide higher education for the benefit of the young especially the poor in and around Thoothukudi.

== Inception ==
After clearing several hurdles, our founder secretary, Shri. A. P. C. Veerabahu was able to arrange for the inception of our college. Shri. P. Kumarasamy Raja, the then Chief Minister of Madras State, laid the foundation stone of the college in 1947.

Affiliated to the then Madras University, a number of under graduate courses were started in various disciplines. Five hostels, including the three that were built within the campus provided stay to the outstation students of the college.

In 1966, the College was affiliated to the newly born Madurai University. In the post 1966 period, this college emerged as a post-graduate centre with the introduction of P.G courses in several disciplines like English and Chemistry. At that time, this college was the largest college in Madurai University area for many years in terms of student strength. A Central Hall with gallery and an architecturally elegant Auditorium were later built in the college to organise seminars and cultural programmes.

== Silver Jubilee ==
Recognizing the research activities going on in this college, the SPIC has put up a Research Centre namely SPIC Research Centre within the college campus to house all the research activities under one roof in commemoration of the Silver Jubilee Celebration of Southern Petrol Chemical Industries Corporation. A big separate library building was constructed recently and its holdings run to 54,367 volumes and it subscribes to 76 journals and periodicals. At present 1300 students are studying in this college. The college is offering 11 under graduate courses 9 post graduate courses and 3 M. Phil courses. 116 Teachers and 42 Non-teaching staff are working in the college. The college is now affiliated to Manonmaniam Sundaranar University, Tirunelveli.

In consonance with the wish of its Founder that the infrastructure of the college should be utilized to its optimum level the V. O. Chidambaram Evening College was started. Graduate and Post graduate courses are conducted in subjects like Commerce, Physics, Chemistry, Zoology, Banking Management and Computer Science. Three modern Computer Laboratories with centralized air conditioning have been the latest additions to the infrastructure of this college.

== Alumni ==
- Ayyalusamy Ramamoorthy, graduated from the Department of Chemistry in 1984, is now at the University of Michigan. He is a scientist in the area of NMR and biological membranes.
- C. P. Radhakrishnan, 15th Vice President of India.
