= Kartikeya Vajpai =

Indian writer and lawyer

Kartikeya Vajpai is an Indian author, public speaker and advocate, who is best known for his debut novel, The Unbecoming: Let Life Reveal Its Purpose. His work addresses themes including spirituality, awareness, creativity, and self-inquiry.

== Biography ==
Vajpai was introduced to professional cricket at a young age and represented Madhya Pradesh at the national Under-14 cricket level. During this period, he learned Tratak, a yogic concentration practice, and was introduced to Transcendental Meditation, which influenced his interest in spirituality and contemplative philosophy. Vajpai has earned bachelor's degrees in both commerce and law. He also holds a master's degree in business administration.

Vajpai began his professional career as a corporate marketing strategist before turning into a full-time lawyer. He is the founder of a boutique law firm based in New Delhi. Vajpai has played for Team India Lawyers in multiple editions of the Lawyers Cricket World Cup.

=== Writing career ===
Vajpai's debut novel The Unbecoming: Let Life Reveal Its Purpose was published in December 2025. Published by Penguin Random House India, the novel is set partly in the world of cricket. The novel follows Siddharth, a successful cricketer, and Ajay, his former coach, as they confront questions of identity, ambition, failure and purpose. The Indian Express described the novel's central concerns as involving ego, attachment and the search for stillness. The novel was later presented at the Jaipur Literature Festival in January 2026. Asianet described the novel as examining the conflicts and uncertainties of modern life, grounded in the philosophies of Advaita Vedanta and Buddhism. The book also explores the relationship between stillness and action, a concept Vajpai frequently references in his public talks and interviews.
