= Indian National Developmental Inclusive Alliance =

Indian big tent political coalition led by the INC

- Abbreviation: INDIA
- Rajya Sabha Leader: Mallikarjun Kharge (LoP)
- Lok Sabha Leader: Rahul Gandhi (LoP)
- Founder: List: Mallikarjun Kharge, INC; Rahul Gandhi, INC; Sitaram Yechury, CPI(M); D. Raja, CPI; Sharad Pawar, NCP–SP; M. K. Stalin, DMK; Lalu Prasad Yadav, RJD; Akhilesh Yadav, SP; Mamata Banerjee, AITC; Nitish Kumar, JD(U); Arvind Kejriwal, AAP; Farooq Abdullah, JKNC; Hemant Soren, JMM; Mehbooba Mufti, JKPDP; Uddhav Thackeray, SS(UBT)
- Founded: 17 July 2023; 3 years ago
- Preceded by: UPA; UO
- Political position: Centre (Note: Members consists of right-wing to far-left parties.)
- Colours: (Official) (Alternative)
- ECI status: Not Required
- Alliance: 25 Parties Regional Alliances: UDF or LDF (Kerala); MPSA (Manipur); MVA (Maharashtra); SDF and LF (Tripura); SSJVA and LF (Tamil Nadu and Puducherry); MGB (Jharkhand); SP+ (Uttar Pradesh); MGB (Bihar); ASM (Assam); LF and LF+ (West Bengal)
- Seats in Rajya Sabha: 62 / 245
- Seats in Lok Sabha: 183 / 543
- Seats in State Legislative Councils: 97 / 423
- Seats in State Legislative Assemblies: 1,170 / 4,036
- Number of states and union territories in government: 7 / 31

The Indian National Developmental Inclusive Alliance (INDIA) is a big tent multi-party political alliance of several political parties in India led by the country's largest opposition party, the Indian National Congress. The alliance is against the ideology and governance of the ruling National Democratic Alliance (NDA) government led by the Bharatiya Janata Party (BJP).

== Etymology ==
The Indian National Developmental Inclusive Alliance, commonly known by its backronym I.N.D.I.A. is an opposition front announced by the leaders of 28 parties to contest the 2024 Lok Sabha elections. The name was proposed during a meeting in Bengaluru and was unanimously adopted by the 28 participating parties. While some sources attribute the suggestion of the name to Rahul Gandhi, the leader face of the Indian National Congress (INC), others mention that it was suggested by Mamata Banerjee, the Trinamool Congress (TMC) supremo and the then chief minister of West Bengal.

== History ==
On September 25, 2022, Indian National Lok Dal (INLD) supremo Om Prakash Chautala hosted a rally in Fatehabad on the occasion of former Deputy Prime Minister Devi Lal's birth anniversary. During this rally, the ideas of a national alliance were first openly called on stage. Chief Minister of Bihar Nitish Kumar had said "I'll urge all parties, including Congress, to get together and then they (BJP) will lose badly". JD(U) spokesperson K. C. Tyagi had also stated that the foundation of the alliance was during this same rally.

The first major Opposition parties' meeting, held in Patna, Bihar, was chaired by Nitish Kumar on 23 June 2023, when the proposal for a new alliance was put on the table. The meeting was attended by 16 Opposition parties. INLD was not included in this meeting.

The second meeting, was held in Bengaluru, Karnataka on 17–18 July. It was chaired by UPA Chairperson Sonia Gandhi when the proposal for an alliance was accepted and ten more parties were added to the list. The alliance's name was finalized and given the name Indian National Developmental Inclusive Alliance.

The third meeting was held in Mumbai, Maharashtra from 31 August to 1 September. The meeting was hosted by Shiv Sena (UBT) President Uddhav Thackeray and saw Sonia Gandhi, Rahul Gandhi, and chief ministers of 5 states in attendance. Over the two-day deliberations, the alliance discussed major electoral issues for the upcoming general elections, carved out the coordination committee, and passed a three-point resolution to fight 2024 Indian general elections together 'as far as possible'.

The fourth meeting was held in New Delhi on 19 December. The meeting was primarily held to discuss seat-sharing, joint rallies, and the prime ministerial face and/or convenor of the alliance. The alliance adopted a resolution to ensure maximum use of VVPATs in upcoming elections. "To enhance confidence in elections, VVPAT slips should be directly given to voters to self-verify and place in a separate box, instead of them falling into the main box. Eventually, all VVPAT slips must be 100% counted, ensuring truly free and fair elections," read the resolution passed by the alliance at the meeting. Seat sharing was also to be done by either 31 December 2023 or mid-January 2024. It was also decided that protests will be held across the country on 22 December 2023 against the suspensions of opposition MPs in the Indian Parliament. Some leaders said that the alliance would hold a grand joint rally at Patna on 30 January 2024, the death anniversary of Mahatma Gandhi, although this was not officially announced.

The alliance held its 5th meeting virtually with some leaders not attending. Following the meeting, the Indian National Congress President Mallikarjun Kharge was declared the alliance chairperson. Members also had discussions about seat sharing. Nitish Kumar, the chief minister of Bihar, was offered the post of national convenor of the alliance which he declined. Nitish Kumar went on to join the National Democratic Alliance in the 2024 Bihar political crisis two weeks later.

== Campaign ==
The bloc held its first event together on 22 December 2023, when nationwide protests were launched against the suspensions of opposition MPs in the Indian Parliament. Congress President Mallikarjun Kharge, party leader face Rahul Gandhi, NCP President Sharad Pawar, CPI(M) leader face Sitaram Yechury and other leaders held protests against the suspensions of MPs under the banner "Save Democracy" and "Save Constitution" at Jantar Mantar, New Delhi.

The bloc's first joint rally was held in Patna, Bihar on 3 March 2024. The rally saw, among others, Kharge, Rahul Gandhi, Rashtriya Janata Dal (RJD) chief Lalu Prasad Yadav, former Bihar Deputy Chief Minister Tejashwi Yadav, Samajwadi Party supremo Akhilesh Yadav, and senior Left leaders Sitaram Yechury and D. Raja. Kharge attacked Kumar for frequently changing alliances and criticised the BJP for not fulfilling its promise of job creation and neglecting the country's poor and the majority.

== Member parties ==
The Indian National Developmental Inclusive Alliance comprises a diverse range of political parties from across India. The member parties of the alliance are:

#	Party		Logo/Flag	Base	Political Position	Portrait	Leader	Ref.(s)
National Parties
1	INC	Indian National Congress		National Party	Centre to Centre-left		Mallikarjun Kharge	
2	CPI(M)	Communist Party of India (Marxist)		National Party	Left-wing		M. A. Baby	
Regional parties
3	SP	Samajwadi Party		Uttar Pradesh	Left-wing		Akhilesh Yadav	
4	MAITC	Mamata All India Trinamool Congress		West Bengal, Meghalaya	Centre		Mamata Banerjee	
5	SS(UBT)	Shiv Sena (Uddhav Balasaheb Thackeray)		Maharashtra	Centre-right to right-wing		Uddhav Thackeray	
6	NCP–SP	Nationalist Congress Party – Sharadchandra Pawar		Maharashtra	Centre-left		Sharad Pawar	
7	RJD	Rashtriya Janata Dal		Bihar, Jharkhand	Centre-left to left-wing		Lalu Prasad Yadav	
8	JMM	Jharkhand Mukti Morcha		Jharkhand	Regionalism		Hemant Soren	
9	JKNC	Jammu and Kashmir National Conference		Jammu and Kashmir	Regionalism		Farooq Abdullah	
10	JKPDP	Jammu and Kashmir Peoples Democratic Party		Jammu and Kashmir	Regionalism		Mehbooba Mufti	
11	TVK	Tamilaga Vettri Kazhagam		Tamil Nadu, Puducherry	Centre-left		C. Joseph Vijay	
12	CPI	Communist Party of India		Kerala	Left-wing		D. Raja	
13	CPI(ML)L	Communist Party of India (Marxist–Leninist) Liberation		Bihar	Far-left		Dipankar Bhattacharya	
14	RSP	Revolutionary Socialist Party		Kerala	Far-left		Manoj Bhattacharya	
15	AIFB	All India Forward Bloc		West Bengal	Far-left		G. Devarajan	
16	PWPI	Peasants and Workers Party of India		Maharashtra	Left-wing		Jayant Prabhakar Patil	
17	VCK	Viduthalai Chiruthaigal Katchi		Tamil Nadu	Syncretic		Thol. Thirumavalavan	
18	IUML	Indian Union Muslim League		Kerala	Centre-right		K. M. Kader Mohideen	
19	KC	Kerala Congress		Kerala	Centre		P. J. Joseph	
20	KC(J)	Kerala Congress (Jacob)		Kerala	Centre		Anoop Jacob	
21	KC(M)	Kerala Congress (Mani)		Kerala	Centre-left to left-wing		Jose K. Mani	
22	MDMK	Marumalarchi Dravida Munnetra Kazhagam		Tamil Nadu	Centre-left		Vaiko	
23	RLP	Rashtriya Loktantrik Party		Rajasthan	Regionalism		Hanuman Beniwal	
24	BAP	Bharat Adivasi Party		Rajasthan	Regionalism		Rajkumar Roat	
25	AJP	Apni Janata Party		Uttar Pradesh	Regionalism		Swami Prasad Maurya	

== Organisational structure ==
Organisational structure of the Alliance

Party	Coordination Committee and Election Strategy Committee	Campaign Committee	Working Group for Media	Working Group for Social Media	Working Group for Research
All India Forward Bloc	–	G. Devarajan	Naren Chatterjee	–	–
Communist Party of India	D. Raja	Binoy Viswam	Bhalchandran Kango	Bhalchandran Kango	–
Communist Party of India (Marxist)	TBD	R. Arun Kumar	Pranjal	Pranjal	–
Communist Party of India (Marxist–Leninist) Liberation	–	Ravi Rai	Sucheta Di	V Arun Kumar	–
Dravida Munnetra Kazhagam	T R Baalu	Tiruchi Siva	Kanimozhi Karunanidhi	Dayanidhi Maran	A Raja
Indian National Congress	K. C. Venugopal	Gurdeep Singh Sappal	Jairam Ramesh; Pawan Khera	Supriya Srinate	Amitabh Dubey
Indian Union Muslim League	–	K. M. Kader Mohideen	–	–	–
Jammu & Kashmir National Conference	Omar Abdullah	Hasnain Masoodi	Tanvir Sadiq	Ifra Ja	Imran Nabi Dar
Jammu and Kashmir People's Democratic Party	Mehbooba Mufti	Dr Mehboob Beg	Mohit Bhan	Iltija Mehbooba	Ad. Aditya
Jharkhand Mukti Morcha	Hemant Soren	Champai Soren	Supriyo Bhattacharya; Alok Kumar	Avindani	Sudivya Kumar Sonu
Kerala Congress (M)	–	Jose K. Mani	–	–	–
Nationalist Congress Party – Sharadchandra Pawar	Sharad Pawar	P. C. Chacko	Jitendra Ahwad	–	Vandana Chavan
Rashtriya Janata Dal	Tejashwi Yadav	Sanjay Yadav	Manoj Jha	Sumit Sharma	Prof. Subodh Mehta
Revolutionary Socialist Party	–	N. K. Premachandran	–	–	–
Samajwadi Party	Javed Ali Khan	Kiranmoy Nanda	Ashish Yadav; Rajeev Nigam	Ashish Yadav	Alok Ranjan
Shiv Sena (Uddhav Balasaheb Thackeray)	Sanjay Raut	Anil Desai	Arvind Sawant	–	Priyanka Chaturvedi
Mamata All India Trinamool Congress	Abhishek Banerjee	–	–	–	–
Viduthalai Chiruthaigal Katchi	–	Thirumavalavan	–	–	–

== List of current chief ministers ==

State	Portrait	Chief Minister	Ministry	Portrait	Deputy Chief Minister	Governing parties
Himachal Pradesh		Sukhvinder Singh Sukhu (INC)	Sukhu		Mukesh Agnihotri (INC)	INC
Karnataka		D. K. Shivakumar (INC)	Shivakumar		G. Parameshwara (INC)	INC
Karnataka		D. K. Shivakumar (INC)	Shivakumar		G. Parameshwara (INC)	IND
Keralam		V.D. Satheesan (INC)	Satheesan	Vacant		INC
Keralam		V.D. Satheesan (INC)	Satheesan	Vacant		IUML
Keralam		V.D. Satheesan (INC)	Satheesan	Vacant		KC
Keralam		V.D. Satheesan (INC)	Satheesan	Vacant		RSP
Keralam		V.D. Satheesan (INC)	Satheesan	Vacant		KC(J)
Keralam		V.D. Satheesan (INC)	Satheesan	Vacant		RMPI
Keralam		V.D. Satheesan (INC)	Satheesan	Vacant		CMP
Keralam		V.D. Satheesan (INC)	Satheesan	Vacant		IND
Telangana		Revanth Reddy (INC)	Reddy		Mallu Bhatti Vikramarka (INC)	INC
Telangana		Revanth Reddy (INC)	Reddy		Mallu Bhatti Vikramarka (INC)	CPI
Jammu and Kashmir		Omar Abdullah (JKNC)	Abdullah II		Surinder Kumar Choudhary (JKNC)	JKNC
Jammu and Kashmir		Omar Abdullah (JKNC)	Abdullah II		Surinder Kumar Choudhary (JKNC)	INC
Jammu and Kashmir		Omar Abdullah (JKNC)	Abdullah II		Surinder Kumar Choudhary (JKNC)	IND
Jammu and Kashmir		Omar Abdullah (JKNC)	Abdullah II		Surinder Kumar Choudhary (JKNC)	CPI(M)
Jharkhand		Hemant Soren (JMM)	Soren IV	Vacant		JMM
Jharkhand		Hemant Soren (JMM)	Soren IV	Vacant		INC
Jharkhand		Hemant Soren (JMM)	Soren IV	Vacant		RJD
Jharkhand		Hemant Soren (JMM)	Soren IV	Vacant		CPI(M-L)L
Tamil Nadu		C. Joseph Vijay (TVK)	Vijay I	Vacant		TVK
Tamil Nadu		C. Joseph Vijay (TVK)	Vijay I	Vacant		INC
Tamil Nadu		C. Joseph Vijay (TVK)	Vijay I	Vacant		IUML
Tamil Nadu		C. Joseph Vijay (TVK)	Vijay I	Vacant		VCK

== List of current opposition leaders ==
=== Parliament of India ===
This is the list of current opposition leaders in the Parliament of India:

Portrait	Name	Elected constituency	Term of office			Political party
Portrait	Name	Elected constituency	Assumed office	Left office	Time in office	Political party
Rajya Sabha
	Mallikarjun Kharge	Karnataka	16 February 2021	Incumbent	5 years, 279 days	Indian National Congress
Lok Sabha
	Rahul Gandhi	Rae Bareli	9 June 2024	Incumbent	2 years, 166 days	Indian National Congress

=== Legislatures of the States and Union territories ===
==== State Legislative Councils ====
This is the list of current opposition leaders in the legislative councils of the Indian states:

State	Portrait	Name	Party
Bihar		Rabri Devi	Rashtriya Janata Dal
Uttar Pradesh		Lal Bihari Yadav	Samajwadi Party

==== State Legislative Assemblies ====
This is the list of current opposition leaders in the legislative assemblies of the Indian states and union territories:

State/UT	Portrait	Name	Party
Bihar		Tejashwi Yadav	Rashtriya Janata Dal
Chhattisgarh		Charan Das Mahant	Indian National Congress
Goa		Yuri Alemao	Indian National Congress
Haryana		Bhupinder Singh Hooda	Indian National Congress
Keralam (Note: CPI(M) is a constituent of the INDIA Alliance at the national level. However, in Kerala, the CPI(M)-led LDF currently serves as the principal opposition, while the Congress-led UDF is the ruling alliance.)		Pinarayi Vijayan	Communist Party of India (Marxist)
Madhya Pradesh		Umang Singhar	Indian National Congress
Meghalaya		Mukul Sangma	Mamata Trinamool Congress
Punjab		Partap Singh Bajwa	Indian National Congress
Rajasthan		Tika Ram Jully	Indian National Congress
Tripura		Jitendra Chaudhury	Communist Party of India (Marxist)
Uttarakhand		Yashpal Arya	Indian National Congress
Uttar Pradesh		Mata Prasad Pandey	Samajwadi Party

== List of current speakers and deputy speakers ==
=== State Legislative Assemblies ===
This is the list of current Speakers and Deputy Speakers of the legislative assemblies of the Indian states and union territories:

States	Speaker	Party	Deputy Speaker	Party
Himachal Pradesh	Kuldeep Singh Pathania	INC	Vinay Kumar	INC
Jharkhand	Rabindra Nath Mahato	JMM	Vacant	N/A
Karnataka	U. T. Khader	INC	Rudrappa Manappa Lamani	INC
Keralam	Thiruvanchoor Radhakrishnan	INC	Shanimol Osman	INC
Telangana	Gaddam Prasad Kumar	INC	Jatoth Ram Chander Naik	INC

Union Territories	Speaker	Party	Deputy Speaker	Party
Jammu and Kashmir	Abdul Rahim Rather	JKNC	Vacant	N/A

== Strength in parliament ==
=== Party-wise strength ===
The following is the party-wise strength of INDIA parties in the Parliament of India:

Party	Lok Sabha	Rajya Sabha	Presence
Indian National Congress (INC)	98 / 543	30 / 245	National Party
Samajwadi Party (SP)	37 / 543	5 / 245	Uttar Pradesh
Mamata Trinamool Congress (MITC)	8 / 543	9 / 245	West Bengal
Nationalist Congress Party – Sharadchandra Pawar (NCP–SP)	8 / 543	1 / 245	Maharashtra
Communist Party of India (Marxist) (CPI(M))	4 / 543	3 / 245	National Party
Rashtriya Janata Dal (RJD)	4 / 543	3 / 245	Bihar
Indian Union Muslim League (IUML)	3 / 543	2 / 245	Kerala
Jharkhand Mukti Morcha (JMM)	3 / 543	2 / 245	Jharkhand
Shiv Sena (Uddhav Balasaheb Thackeray) (SS(UBT))	3 / 543	1 / 245	Maharashtra
Communist Party of India (CPI)	2 / 543	2 / 245	Tamil Nadu
Communist Party of India (Marxist–Leninist) Liberation (CPI(ML)L)	2 / 543	–	Bihar
Viduthalai Chiruthaigal Katchi (VCK)	2 / 543	–	Tamil Nadu
Jammu and Kashmir National Conference (JKNC)	1 / 543	3 / 245	Jammu and Kashmir
Bharat Adivasi Party (BAP)	1 / 543	–	Rajasthan
Marumalarchi Dravida Munnetra Kazhagam (MDMK)	1 / 543	–	Tamil Nadu
Kerala Congress (KEC)	1 / 543	–	Kerala
Rashtriya Loktantrik Party (RLP)	1 / 543	–	Rajasthan
Revolutionary Socialist Party (RSP)	1 / 543	–	Kerala
Kerala Congress (M) (KCM)	–	1 / 245	Kerala
IND	3 / 543	1 / 245	–
Total	183 / 543	62 / 245	India

=== State-UT-wise strength ===
State/UT	Lok Sabha			Rajya Sabha		
State/UT	Total seats	INDIA	Overall tally	Total Seats	INDIA	Overall tally
Andaman and Nicobar	1	None				
Andhra Pradesh	25	None		11	None	
Arunachal Pradesh	2	None		1	None	
Assam	14	INC (2)	2 / 14	7	None	
Bihar	40	RJD (4)	10 / 40	16	RJD (3)	4 / 16
Bihar	40	INC (4)	10 / 40	16	INC (1)	4 / 16
Bihar	40	CPI(ML)L (2)	10 / 40	16		4 / 16
Chandigarh	1	INC (1)	1 / 1			
Chhattisgarh	10	INC (1)	1 / 11	5	INC (3)	3 / 5
Dadra and Nagar Haveli	2	None				
Delhi	7	None		3	None	
Goa	2	INC (1)	1 / 2	1	None	
Gujarat	26	INC (1)	1 / 26	11	None	
Haryana	10	INC (5)	5 / 10	5	INC (1)	1 / 5
Himachal Pradesh	4	None		3	INC (1)	1 / 3
Jammu and Kashmir	5	JKNC (2)	2 / 5	4	JKNC (3)	3 / 4
Jharkhand	14	JMM (3)	5 / 14	6	JMM (3)	4 / 6
Jharkhand	14	INC (2)	5 / 14	6	INC (1)	4 / 6
Karnataka	28	INC (9)	9 / 28	12	INC (7)	7 / 12
Kerala	20	INC (14)	19 / 20	9	CPI(M) (4)	9 / 9
Kerala	20	IUML (2)	19 / 20	9	IUML (2)	9 / 9
Kerala	20	KEC (2)	19 / 20	9	INC (1)	9 / 9
Kerala	20	CPI(M) (1)	19 / 20	9	CPI (2)	9 / 9
Kerala	20	KEC (1)	19 / 20	9		9 / 9
Ladakh	1	IND (1)	1 / 1			
Lakshadweep	1	INC (1)	1 / 1			
Madhya Pradesh	29	None		11	INC (3)	3 / 11
Maharashtra	48	INC (14)	25 / 48	19	SS(UBT) (1)	4 / 19
Maharashtra	48	SS(UBT) (3)	25 / 48	19	INC (2)	4 / 19
Maharashtra	48	NCP-SP (8)	25 / 48	19	NCP-SP (1)	4 / 19
Manipur	2	INC (1)	2 / 2	1	None	
Meghalaya	2	INC (1)	1 / 2	1	None	
Mizoram	1	None		1	None	
Nagaland	1	INC (1)	1 / 1	1	None	
Odisha	21	INC (1)	1 / 21	10	None	
Puducherry	1	INC (1)	1 / 1	1	None	
Punjab	13	INC (7)	7 / 13	7	None	
Rajasthan	25	INC (8)	11 / 25	10	INC (5)	5 / 10
Rajasthan	25	RLP (1)	11 / 25	10		5 / 10
Rajasthan	25	BAP (1)	11 / 25	10		5 / 10
Rajasthan	25	CPI(M) (1)	11 / 25	10		5 / 10
Sikkim	1	None		1	None	
Tamil Nadu	39	INC (9)	17 / 39	18	INC (3)	4 / 18
Tamil Nadu	39	VCK (2)	17 / 39	18		4 / 18
Tamil Nadu	39	CPI (2)	17 / 39	18		4 / 18
Tamil Nadu	39	CPI(M) (2)	17 / 39	18	MNM (1)	4 / 18
Tamil Nadu	39	IUML (1)	17 / 39	18		4 / 18
Tamil Nadu	39	MDMK (1)	17 / 39	18		4 / 18
Telangana	17	INC (8)	8 / 17	7	INC (4)	4 / 7
Tripura	2	None		1	None	
Uttar Pradesh	80	SP (37)	43 / 80	31	SP (5)	6 / 31
Uttar Pradesh	80	INC (6)	43 / 80	31	IND (1)	6 / 31
Uttarakhand	5	None		3	None	
West Bengal	42	MAITC (8)	8 / 42	16	MAITC (9)	9 / 16
West Bengal	42	INC (1)	8 / 42	16		9 / 16

== Strength in legislative assemblies ==
- : In Power

State Wise strength in legislative assemblies
State/UT	Total Seats	Last Election	INDIA	Overall Tally	CM from
Andhra Pradesh	175	2024	None		TDP
Arunachal Pradesh	60	2024	INC (1)	1 / 60	BJP
Assam	126	2026	INC (19)	20 / 126	BJP
Assam	126	2026	MAITC (1)	20 / 126	BJP
Bihar	243	2025	RJD (25)	35 / 243	BJP
Bihar	243	2025	INC (6)	35 / 243	BJP
Bihar	243	2025	CPI(ML)L (2)	35 / 243	BJP
Bihar	243	2025	CPI(M) (1)	35 / 243	BJP
Bihar	243	2025	IIP (1)	35 / 243	BJP
Chhattisgarh	90	2023	INC (35)	35 / 90	BJP
Delhi	70	2025	None		BJP
Goa	40	2022	INC (3)	3 / 40	BJP
Gujarat	182	2022	INC (12)	13 / 182	BJP
Gujarat	182	2022	SP (1)	13 / 182	BJP
Haryana	90	2024	INC (37)	37 / 90	BJP
Himachal Pradesh	68	2022	INC (40)	40 / 68	INC
Jammu and Kashmir	90	2024	JKNC (41)	59 / 90	JKNC
Jammu and Kashmir	90	2024	INC (6)	59 / 90	JKNC
Jammu and Kashmir	90	2024	JKPDP (4)	59 / 90	JKNC
Jammu and Kashmir	90	2024	CPI(M) (1)	59 / 90	JKNC
Jammu and Kashmir	90	2024	Independent (6)	59 / 90	JKNC
Jharkhand	81	2024	JMM (34)	56 / 81	JMM
Jharkhand	81	2024	INC (16)	56 / 81	JMM
Jharkhand	81	2024	RJD (4)	56 / 81	JMM
Jharkhand	81	2024	CPI(ML)L (2)	56 / 81	JMM
Karnataka	224	2023	INC (138)	141 / 224	INC
Karnataka	224	2023	Independent (2)	141 / 224	INC
Kerala	140	2026	INC (63)	137 / 140	INC
Kerala	140	2026	CPI(M) (26)	137 / 140	INC
Kerala	140	2026	IUML (22)	137 / 140	INC
Kerala	140	2026	CPI (8)	137 / 140	INC
Kerala	140	2026	KEC (7)	137 / 140	INC
Kerala	140	2026	RSP (3)	137 / 140	INC
Kerala	140	2026	RJD (1)	137 / 140	INC
Kerala	140	2026	JKC (1)	137 / 140	INC
Kerala	140	2026	CMP (1)	137 / 140	INC
Kerala	140	2026	RMPI (1)	137 / 140	INC
Kerala	140	2026	Independent (3)	137 / 140	INC
Madhya Pradesh	230	2023	INC (65)	66 / 230	BJP
Madhya Pradesh	230	2023	BAP (1)	66 / 230	BJP
Maharashtra	288	2024	SS(UBT) (20)	50 / 288	BJP
Maharashtra	288	2024	INC (16)	50 / 288	BJP
Maharashtra	288	2024	NCP-SP (10)	50 / 288	BJP
Maharashtra	288	2024	SP (2)	50 / 288	BJP
Maharashtra	288	2024	PWPI (1)	50 / 288	BJP
Maharashtra	288	2024	CPI(M) (1)	50 / 288	BJP
Manipur	60	2022	INC (5)	5 / 60	BJP
Meghalaya	60	2023	MAITC (5)	5 / 60	NPP
Mizoram	40	2023	INC (1)	1 / 40	ZPM
Nagaland	60	2023	None		NPF
Odisha	147	2024	INC (14)	15 / 147	BJP
Odisha	147	2024	CPI(M) (1)	15 / 147	BJP
Puducherry	30	2026	TVK (2)	5 / 30	AINRC
Puducherry	30	2026	INC (1)	5 / 30	AINRC
Puducherry	30	2026	Independent (1)	5 / 30	AINRC
Punjab	117	2022	INC (16)	16 / 117	AAP
Rajasthan	200	2023	INC (67)	71 / 200	BJP
Rajasthan	200	2023	BAP (4)	71 / 200	BJP
Sikkim	32	2024	None		SKM
Tamil Nadu	234	2026	TVK (108)	121 / 234	TVK
Tamil Nadu	234	2026	INC (5)	121 / 234	TVK
Tamil Nadu	234	2026	VCK (2)	121 / 234	TVK
Tamil Nadu	234	2026	CPI (2)	121 / 234	TVK
Tamil Nadu	234	2026	CPI(M) (2)	121 / 234	TVK
Tamil Nadu	234	2026	IUML (2)	121 / 234	TVK
Telangana	119	2023	INC (76)	77 / 119	INC
Telangana	119	2023	CPI (1)	77 / 119	INC
Tripura	60	2023	CPI(M) (10)	13 / 60	BJP
Tripura	60	2023	INC (3)	13 / 60	BJP
Uttar Pradesh	403	2022	SP (100)	102 / 403	BJP
Uttar Pradesh	403	2022	INC (2)	102 / 403	BJP
Uttarakhand	70	2022	INC (20)	20 / 70	BJP
West Bengal	294	2026	MAITC (15)	18 / 294	BJP
West Bengal	294	2026	INC (2)	18 / 294	BJP
West Bengal	294	2026	CPI(M) (1)	18 / 294	BJP
Total	4036		INDIA	1,162 / 4,036	

== Strength in legislative councils ==
- : In power

State/UT	Total seats	INDIA	Overall tally	Party with a plurality/majority
Andhra Pradesh	58	None		TDP
Bihar	75	RJD (17)	19 / 75	BJP
Bihar	75	INC (1)	19 / 75	BJP
Bihar	75	CPI(ML)L (1)	19 / 75	BJP
Karnataka	75	INC (38)	39 / 75	INC
Karnataka	75	Independent (1)	39 / 75	INC
Maharashtra	78	INC (4)	12 / 78	BJP
Maharashtra	78	SS(UBT) (5)	12 / 78	BJP
Maharashtra	78	NCP-SP (3)	12 / 78	BJP
Telangana	40	INC (13)	15 / 40	INC
Telangana	40	CPI (1)	15 / 40	INC
Telangana	40	Independent (1)	15 / 40	INC
Uttar Pradesh	100	SP (12)	12 / 100	BJP
Total	426	INDIA	97 / 426	

== Electoral performances ==
=== Lok Sabha ===
Election
Seats won
Change
Total votes
Share of votes
Swing
Status
Leader
2024
234 / 543
New
267,717,018
40.6%
New
Opposition
Mallikarjun Kharge

2024 general election

Party or alliance		Votes	%	Seats	+/–		
Indian National Developmental Inclusive Alliance	Indian National Congress	136,758,952	51.08	99	+47		
Indian National Developmental Inclusive Alliance	Samajwadi Party	29,549,389	11.04	37	+32		
Indian National Developmental Inclusive Alliance	All India Trinamool Congress	28,213,393	10.54	29	+7		
Indian National Developmental Inclusive Alliance	Dravida Munnetra Kazhagam	11,754,710	4.39	22	–2		
Indian National Developmental Inclusive Alliance	Communist Party of India (Marxist)	11,342,553	4.24	4	+1		
Indian National Developmental Inclusive Alliance	Rashtriya Janata Dal	10,107,402	3.78	4	+4		
Indian National Developmental Inclusive Alliance	Shiv Sena (Uddhav Balasaheb Thackeray)	9,567,779	3.57	9	+9		
Indian National Developmental Inclusive Alliance	Aam Aadmi Party	7,147,800	2.67	3	+2		
Indian National Developmental Inclusive Alliance	Nationalist Congress Party – Sharadchandra Pawar	5,921,162	2.21	8	+8		
Indian National Developmental Inclusive Alliance	Communist Party of India	3,157,184	1.18	2	0		
Indian National Developmental Inclusive Alliance	Jharkhand Mukti Morcha	2,652,955	0.99	3	+2		
Indian National Developmental Inclusive Alliance	Indian Union Muslim League	1,716,186	0.64	3	0		
Indian National Developmental Inclusive Alliance	Communist Party of India (Marxist–Leninist) Liberation	1,736,761	0.65	2	+2		
Indian National Developmental Inclusive Alliance	Bharat Adivasi Party	1,257,056	0.47	1	+1		
Indian National Developmental Inclusive Alliance	Vikassheel Insaan Party	1,187,455	0.44	0	0		
Indian National Developmental Inclusive Alliance	Jammu and Kashmir National Conference	1,147,041	0.43	2	–1		
Indian National Developmental Inclusive Alliance	Viduthalai Chiruthaigal Katchi	990,237	0.37	2	+1		
Indian National Developmental Inclusive Alliance	Rashtriya Loktantrik Party	596,955	0.22	1	0		
Indian National Developmental Inclusive Alliance	Revolutionary Socialist Party	587,363	0.22	1	0		
Indian National Developmental Inclusive Alliance	Marumalarchi Dravida Munnetra Kazhagam	542,213	0.20	1	+1		
Indian National Developmental Inclusive Alliance	Jammu and Kashmir Peoples Democratic Party	435,980	0.16	0	0		
Indian National Developmental Inclusive Alliance	Assam Jatiya Parishad	414,441	0.15	0	0		
Indian National Developmental Inclusive Alliance	Kerala Congress	364,631	0.14	1	0		
Indian National Developmental Inclusive Alliance	All India Forward Bloc	284,269	0.11	0	0		
Indian National Developmental Inclusive Alliance	Kerala Congress (Mani)	277,365	0.10	0	0		
Indian National Developmental Inclusive Alliance	Independents					2	-
Indian National Developmental Inclusive Alliance	Total			267,711,232	100.00	236	0
Registered voters/turnout		968,821,926	–				
Source: ECI

=== Legislative Assembly ===
Election	Year	Seats won	Change	Total votes	Share of votes	Swing	Status
Haryana	2024	37 / 90	▲6	5,464,975	39.34%	▲11.1%	Opposition
Jammu and Kashmir	2024	49 / 90	New	20,52,447	35.99%	New	Government
Maharashtra	2024	49 / 288	▼26	22,710,220	35.16%	New	Opposition
Jharkhand	2024	56 / 81	▲9	7,911,028	44.33	▲8.98	Government
Delhi	2025	0 / 70		601,922	6.34	▲2.08	Lost
Bihar	2025	35 / 243	▼76	18,589,587	37.94	▲0.7	Opposition
Assam	2026	21 / 126	▼9	62,34,722	33.00	▼10.68	Opposition
Kerala	2026	102 / 140	▲61	1,00,51,695	46.55	▲7.07	Government
Puducherry	2026	6 / 30	▼2	2,72,202	31.42	▲1.42	Opposition
Tamil Nadu	2026	74 / 234	▼85	15,482,782	31.4	▼14.41	Opposition
West Bengal (Note: AITC, INC and Left Front contested elections separately.)	2026	80 / 294	▼135	26,190,093	41.08	▼7.38	Opposition
West Bengal	2026	2 / 294	▲2	1,894,984	2.96	▲0.03	Opposition
West Bengal	2026	1 / 294	▲1	4,330,575	6.77	▼0.34	Opposition
Uttarakhand	2027						
Goa	2027						
Manipur	2027						
Punjab	2027						
Uttar Pradesh	2027						

=== Vice presidential elections ===
Vice President of India
Year	Candidate	Party	Home State	Election		Result
Year	Candidate	Party	Home State	Votes	%	Result
2025	B. Sudarshan Reddy	Independent	Telangana	300	39.9%	Lost

=== Candidates in election ===
==== 2024 general elections ====
2024 general election
- List of Indian National Developmental Inclusive Alliance candidates for the 2024 Indian general election

===== Seat sharing summary =====
INDIA parties seat-sharing

Seat-sharing under INDIA bloc
Party	States/UTs	Seats contested		Seats won	
Indian National Congress	Karnataka	28	326	9	99
Indian National Congress	Madhya Pradesh	27	326	0	99
Indian National Congress	Andhra Pradesh	23	326	0	99
Indian National Congress	Gujarat	23	326	1	99
Indian National Congress	Rajasthan	22	326	8	99
Indian National Congress	Odisha	20	326	1	99
Indian National Congress	Maharashtra	17	326	13	99
Indian National Congress	Telangana	17	326	8	99
Indian National Congress	Uttar Pradesh	17	326	6	99
Indian National Congress	Kerala	16	326	14	99
Indian National Congress	Assam	13	326	3	99
Indian National Congress	Punjab	13	326	7	99
Indian National Congress	West Bengal	12	326	1	99
Indian National Congress	Chhattisgarh	11	326	1	99
Indian National Congress	Bihar	9	326	3	99
Indian National Congress	Haryana	9	326	5	99
Indian National Congress	Tamil Nadu	9	326	9	99
Indian National Congress	Jharkhand	7	326	2	99
Indian National Congress	Uttarakhand	5	326	0	99
Indian National Congress	Himachal Pradesh	4	326	0	99
Indian National Congress	Delhi	3	326	0	99
Indian National Congress	Arunachal Pradesh	2	326	0	99
Indian National Congress	Dadra Nagar Haveli and Daman Diu	2	326	0	99
Indian National Congress	Goa	2	326	1	99
Indian National Congress	Jammu and Kashmir	2	326	0	99
Indian National Congress	Manipur	2	326	2	99
Indian National Congress	Meghalaya	2	326	1	99
Indian National Congress	Andaman and Nicobar Islands	1	326	0	99
Indian National Congress	Chandigarh	1	326	1	99
Indian National Congress	Ladakh	1	326	0	99
Indian National Congress	Lakshadweep	1	326	1	99
Indian National Congress	Mizoram	1	326	0	99
Indian National Congress	Nagaland	1	326	1	99
Indian National Congress	Puducherry	1	326	1	99
Indian National Congress	Sikkim	1	326	0	99
Indian National Congress	Tripura	1	326	0	99
Samajwadi Party	Uttar Pradesh	62		37	
Communist Party of India (Marxist)	West Bengal	23	29	0	3
Communist Party of India (Marxist)	Tamil Nadu	2	29	2	3
Communist Party of India (Marxist)	Andhra Pradesh	1	29	0	3
Communist Party of India (Marxist)	Bihar	1	29	0	3
Communist Party of India (Marxist)	Rajasthan	1	29	1	3
Communist Party of India (Marxist)	Tripura	1	29	0	3
Rashtriya Janata Dal	Bihar	23	24	4	4
Rashtriya Janata Dal	Jharkhand	1	24	0	4
Dravida Munnetra Kazhagam	Tamil Nadu	21	22	21	22
Kongunadu Makkal Desia Katchi	Tamil Nadu	1	22	1	22
Shiv Sena (Uddhav Balasaheb Thackeray)	Maharashtra	21		9	
Nationalist Congress Party (Sharadchandra Pawar)	Maharashtra	10		8	
Aam Aadmi Party	Delhi	4	7	0	
Aam Aadmi Party	Gujarat	2	7	0	
Aam Aadmi Party	Haryana	1	7	0	
Communist Party of India	Tamil Nadu	2	6	2	2
Communist Party of India	West Bengal	2	6	0	2
Communist Party of India	Andhra Pradesh	1	6	0	2
Communist Party of India	Bihar	1	6	0	2
Jharkhand Mukti Morcha	Jharkhand	5	6	3	3
Jharkhand Mukti Morcha	Odisha	1	6	0	3
Communist Party of India (Marxist–Leninist) Liberation	Bihar	3	4	2	2
Communist Party of India (Marxist–Leninist) Liberation	Jharkhand	1	4	0	2
Revolutionary Socialist Party	West Bengal	3	4	0	1
Revolutionary Socialist Party	Kerala	1	4	1	1
All India Forward Bloc	West Bengal	2	3	0	
All India Forward Bloc	Madhya Pradesh	1	3	0	
Indian Union Muslim League	Kerala	2	3	2	3
Indian Union Muslim League	Tamil Nadu	1	3	1	3
Jammu & Kashmir National Conference	Jammu and Kashmir	3		2	
Vikassheel Insaan Party	Bihar	3		0	
Viduthalai Chiruthaigal Katchi	Tamil Nadu	2		2	
All India Trinamool Congress	Uttar Pradesh	1		0	
Assam Jatiya Parishad	Assam	1		0	
Bharat Adivasi Party	Rajasthan	1		1	
Kerala Congress	Kerala	1		1	
Marumalarchi Dravida Munnetra Kazhagam	Tamil Nadu	1		1	
Rashtriya Loktantrik Party	Rajasthan	1		1	
Total		541		201	

INDIA parties under regional coalition/outside the alliance

Seats contested by INDIA parties outside the alliance
Parties	States/UTs	Seats contested		Seats Won	
All India Trinamool Congress	West Bengal	42	47	29	29
All India Trinamool Congress	Assam	4	47	0	29
All India Trinamool Congress	Meghalaya	1	47	0	29
All India Forward Bloc	Maharashtra	8	29	0	
All India Forward Bloc	Andhra Pradesh	5	29	0	
All India Forward Bloc	Uttar Pradesh	5	29	0	
All India Forward Bloc	Telangana	3	29	0	
All India Forward Bloc	Bihar	2	29	0	
All India Forward Bloc	Delhi	2	29	0	
All India Forward Bloc	Jammu and Kashmir	2	29	0	
All India Forward Bloc	Odisha	1	29	0	
All India Forward Bloc	West Bengal	1	29	0	
Communist Party of India	Uttar Pradesh	6	24	0	
Communist Party of India	Jharkhand	4	24	0	
Communist Party of India	Kerala	4	24	0	
Communist Party of India	Madhya Pradesh	3	24	0	
Communist Party of India	Punjab	3	24	0	
Communist Party of India	Assam	1	24	0	
Communist Party of India	Chhattisgarh	1	24	0	
Communist Party of India	Maharashtra	1	24	0	
Communist Party of India	Odisha	1	24	0	
Communist Party of India (Marxist)	Kerala	15	23	1	1
Communist Party of India (Marxist)	Andaman and Nicobar Islands	1	23	0	1
Communist Party of India (Marxist)	Assam	1	23	0	1
Communist Party of India (Marxist)	Jharkhand	1	23	0	1
Communist Party of India (Marxist)	Karnataka	1	23	0	1
Communist Party of India (Marxist)	Maharashtra	1	23	0	1
Communist Party of India (Marxist)	Odisha	1	23	0	1
Communist Party of India (Marxist)	Punjab	1	23	0	1
Communist Party of India (Marxist)	Telangana	1	23	0	1
Bharat Adivasi Party	Madhya Pradesh	5	21	0	
Bharat Adivasi Party	Rajasthan	5	21	0	
Bharat Adivasi Party	Maharashtra	4	21	0	
Bharat Adivasi Party	Gujarat	2	21	0	
Bharat Adivasi Party	Jharkhand	2	21	0	
Bharat Adivasi Party	Andhra Pradesh	1	21	0	
Bharat Adivasi Party	Chhattisgarh	1	21	0	
Bharat Adivasi Party	Dadra Nagar Haveli and Daman Diu	1	21	0	
Aam Aadmi Party	Punjab	13	15	3	3
Aam Aadmi Party	Assam	2	15	0	3
Viduthalai Chiruthaigal Katchi	Telangana	7	11	0	
Viduthalai Chiruthaigal Katchi	Karnataka	2	11	0	
Viduthalai Chiruthaigal Katchi	Andhra Pradesh	1	11	0	
Viduthalai Chiruthaigal Katchi	Kerala	1	11	0	
Samajwadi Party	Andhra Pradesh	7	9	0	
Samajwadi Party	Gujarat	1	9	0	
Samajwadi Party	Odisha	1	9	0	
Revolutionary Socialist Party	Andhra Pradesh	3	6	0	
Revolutionary Socialist Party	Punjab	2	6	0	
Revolutionary Socialist Party	Telangana	1	6	0	
Communist Party of India (Marxist–Leninist) Liberation	Andhra Pradesh	1	3	0	
Communist Party of India (Marxist–Leninist) Liberation	Odisha	1	3	0	
Communist Party of India (Marxist–Leninist) Liberation	West Bengal	1	3	0	
Jammu and Kashmir Peoples Democratic Party	Jammu and Kashmir	3		0	
Indian National Congress	West Bengal	1	2	0	
Indian National Congress	Rajasthan	1	2	0	
Nationalist Congress Party (Sharadchandra Pawar)	Haryana	1	2	0	
Nationalist Congress Party (Sharadchandra Pawar)	Lakshadweep	1	2	0	
Kerala Congress (M)	Kerala	1		0	
Total		196		33	

== Ideology and objectives ==
According to the Congress president Mallikarjun Kharge, the alliance's ideology revolves around the principles of developmentalism, inclusivity, and social justice. By combining their efforts, the member parties aim to protect democratic values, promote welfare and progress, and counter what they perceive as an ideology that threatens the idea of India. It was formed with the objective of defeating the incumbent BJP led NDA in the 2024 Indian general election.

=== Resolution ===
The alliance passed a three-point resolution in its third meeting on 1 September 2023 to collectively contest 2024 Indian General elections.

- We, the INDIA parties, hereby resolve to contest the forthcoming Lok Sabha elections together as far as possible. Seat-sharing arrangements in different states will be initiated immediately and concluded at the earliest in a collaborative spirit of give-and-take.
- We, the INDIA parties, hereby resolve to organize public rallies at the earliest in different parts of the country on issues of public concern and importance.
- We, the INDIA parties, hereby resolve to coordinate our respective communications and media strategies and campaigns with the theme Judega BHARAT, Jeetega INDIA in different languages.

== Timeline ==
=== 2024 ===
- 14 January – 17 March: Rahul Gandhi led the Bharat Jodo Nyay Yatra from Thoubal, Manipur to Mumbai, Maharashtra, covering 15 states to highlight social, economic, and political justice; alliance leaders including Tejashwi Yadav and Akhilesh Yadav joined legs of the march before it concluded with a joint INDIA bloc rally at Mumbai's Shivaji Park.
- In January 2024, Nitish Kumar led Janata Dal (United) left the alliance and joined NDA.
- On 3 March 2024, the alliance held its first major joint rally in Patna, Bihar, followed by another joint rally at Shivaji Park in Mumbai on 17 March 2024.
- On 31 March 2024, the bloc organized a Loktantra Bachao (Save Democracy) rally at Ramlila Maidan in New Delhi to protest the arrest of Delhi Chief Minister Arvind Kejriwal and former Jharkhand Chief Minister Hemant Soren.

===== Seat sharing =====
  - Assam - AAP declared candidates for three Lok Sabha seats in Assam after claiming they were tired of negotiations with Congress for seat sharing.
  - Delhi - The AAP is likely to fight on 4 seats whereas the Congress may get 3 seats in Delhi.
  - Punjab - The Congress and AAP declared that they will contest separately in Punjab, in what AAP supremo Arvind Kejriwal described as a "mutual agreement" with "no bad blood" between the parties.
  - Uttar Pradesh - On 21 February 2024, in a joint press conference, the Congress and the Samajwadi Party announced that the Congress will fight in 17 of the 80 seats in Uttar Pradesh, leaving the rest for other alliance members. There were also reported to be talks between the Congress and the SP for seat-sharing in Madhya Pradesh, in which the SP may be offered to contest the Khajuraho seat.
  - West Bengal - West Bengal Chief Minister Mamata Banerjee announced on 24 January 2024 that the Trinamool Congress (TMC) party would run alone in the state's forthcoming general elections. Other members of the alliance will contest as part of there Secular Democratic Alliance.
- In the 2024 Indian general election, the INDIA bloc won 234 out of 543 Lok Sabha seats, falling short of a majority but emerging as the principal opposition against the National Democratic Alliance (NDA).
- On 9 June 2024, Indian National Congress leader Rahul Gandhi was appointed as the Leader of the Opposition in Lok Sabha.
- In the late 2024 state assembly elections, the alliance won and formed governments in Jammu and Kashmir (49/90 seats) and Jharkhand (56/81 seats), while remaining in the opposition in Haryana (37/90) and Maharashtra (49/288).

=== 2025 ===
- In July 2025, the Aam Aadmi Party officially withdrew from the alliance, stating that the bloc had been formed solely for the 2024 Lok Sabha elections.
- On 7 August 2025, Rahul Gandhi hosted a strategy dinner in New Delhi attended by around 50 leaders from over 25 opposition parties to address alleged electoral manipulation and the Special Intensive Revision (SIR) of voter rolls.
- In September 2025, the alliance nominated former judge B. Sudarshan Reddy as its joint Independent candidate for the Vice Presidential election, who lost after securing 300 votes (39.9%).
- In late 2025, the bloc lost the Bihar Legislative Assembly election, winning only 35 out of 243 seats and remaining in the opposition.

=== 2026 ===
- In the April–May 2026 state assembly polls, the Indian National Congress led United Democratic Front formed the government in Kerala winning 102 of 140 seats. The INDIA alliance ended up in the opposition in West Bengal winning 80 of 294, 74 of 234 in Tamil Nadu, 21 of 126 Assam, and 6 of 30 Puducherry.
- In May 2026, following the Tamil Nadu assembly elections, the Dravida Munnetra Kazhagam quit the bloc after the INC, VCK, IUML and left parties decided to supported Tamilaga Vettri Kazhagam to form the state government.
- On 8 June 2026, leaders of 23 opposition parties met at the Constitution Club in New Delhi to reinforce bloc unity after recent electoral setbacks and adopt a five-point agenda against the ruling government.
- In September 2026, Congress terminated ties with Assam's Raijor Dal over a breach of alliance ethics, while the Goa Forward Party exited to form an alliance with AAP ahead of the 2027 assembly polls.
- In October 2026, the Tamilaga Vettri Kazhagam formally joined the alliance.
- On 30 September 2026, the bloc launched a nationwide six-point agitation against alleged irregularities in the voter roll revision (SIR) and demanded the resignation of Chief Election Commissioner Gyanesh Kumar. This included a protest march toward the Supreme Court on 12 October and a massive Vote Bachao, Desh Bachao rally at Delhi's Ramlila Maidan on 1 November 2026.

== Former members ==
Party		Base State	Year of withdrawal	Reference(s)
AD(K)	Apna Dal (Kamerawadi)	Uttar Pradesh	2024	
RLD	Rashtriya Lok Dal	Uttar Pradesh	2024	
JD(U)	Janata Dal (United)	Bihar	2024	
HAM(S)	Hindustani Awam Morcha	Bihar	2023	
AAP	Aam Aadmi Party	National Party	2025	
DMK	Dravida Munnetra Kazhagam	Tamil Nadu; Puducherry	2026	
RD	Raijor Dal	Assam	2026	
GFP	Goa Forward Party	Goa	2026	

=== Exits ===
On 28 January 2024, Nitish Kumar resigned as the Chief Minister of Bihar and decided to leave the Mahagathbandhan alliance, a part of the INDIA bloc in Bihar, by expressing dissatisfaction with the functioning of the government. He rejoined the National Democratic Alliance (NDA). The Rashtriya Lok Dal left the bloc to join the BJP-led NDA on 14 January 2024. In July 2025, the Aam Aadmi Party quit the bloc, stating that the alliance had only been formed for the 2024 Indian general election. Following the 2026 Tamil Nadu Legislative Assembly election, the Dravida Munnetra Kazhagam quit the bloc after the Indian National Congress expressed its support for the Tamilaga Vettri Kazhagam in forming the state government. Prior to its withdrawal, it had submitted a request to the Speaker of Lok Sabha seeking separate seating arrangement for its Members of Parliament away from those of INDIA bloc.

== See also ==
- Mahagathbandhan (Bihar)
- Mahagathbandhan (Jharkhand)
- United Democratic Front (Kerala)
- Maha Vikas Aghadi (Maharashtra)
- Manipur Progressive Secular Alliance (Manipur)
- Secular Democratic Forces (Tripura)
- 2024 Indian general election
