= Religion in India =

Religion in India (2011 census)
1. Hinduism (79.8%)
2. Islam (14.2%)
3. Christianity (2.30%)
4. Sikhism (1.70%)
5. Buddhism (0.70%)
6. Sarnaism (0.40%)
7. Jainism (0.40%)
8. Other religions (0.30%)
9. Not stated (0.20%)
Religion in India (Pew Research Center 2020)
1. Hinduism (79.4%)
2. Islam (15.2%)
3. Christianity (2.20%)
4. Other religions (3.20%)

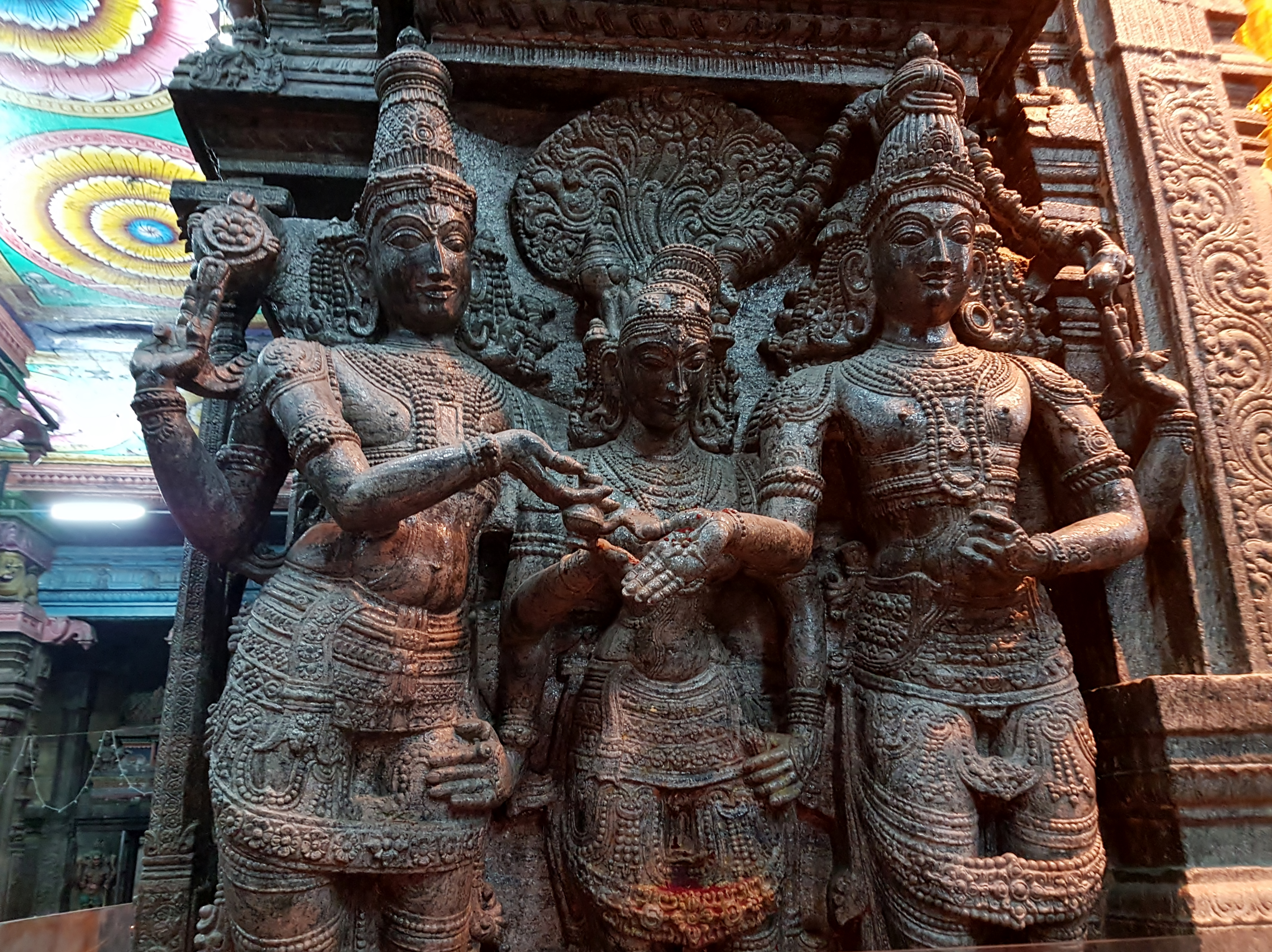
Goddess Meenakshi with consort Shiva and brother Vishnu inside the Meenakshi Temple in Madurai, Tamil Nadu

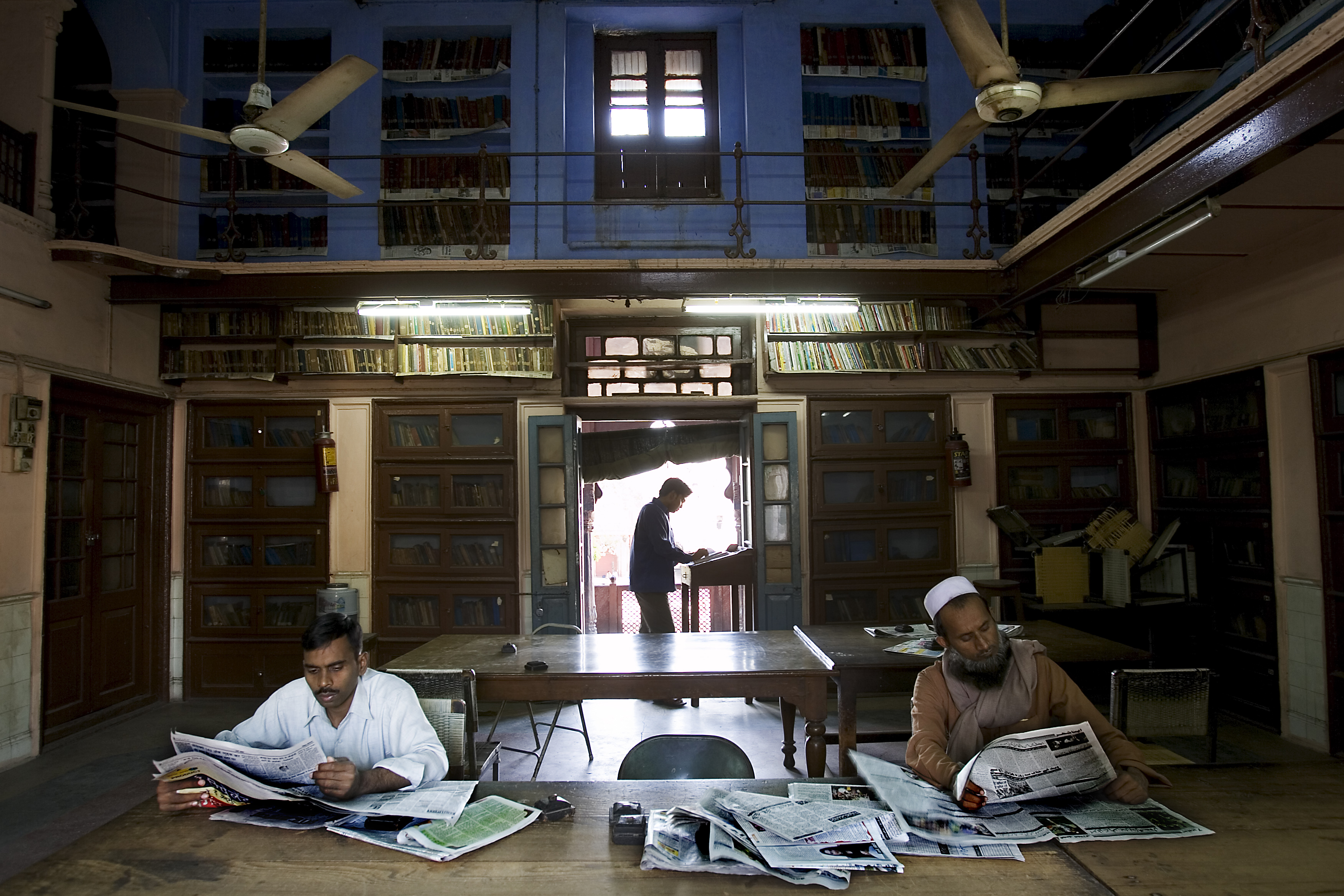
Muslim men in an Islamic library in Delhi

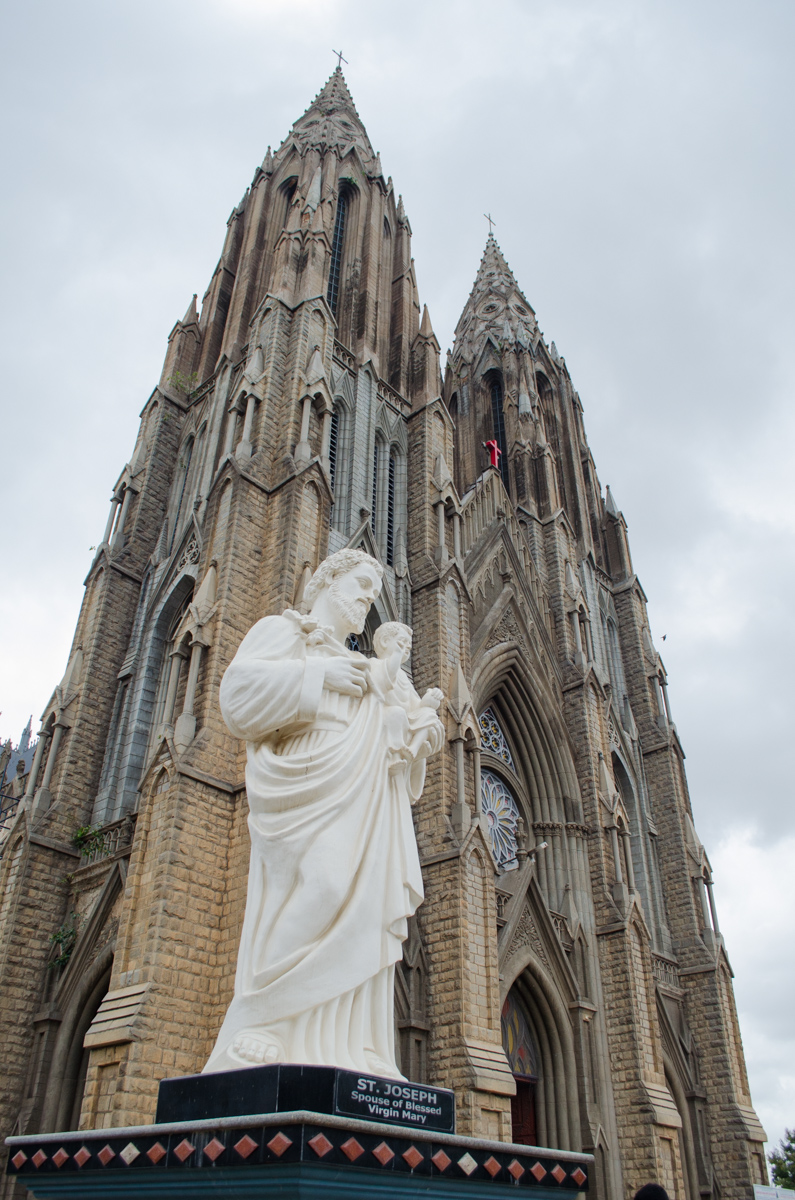
St. Philomena's Cathedral in Mysore, Karnataka, is one of the tallest churches in Asia.

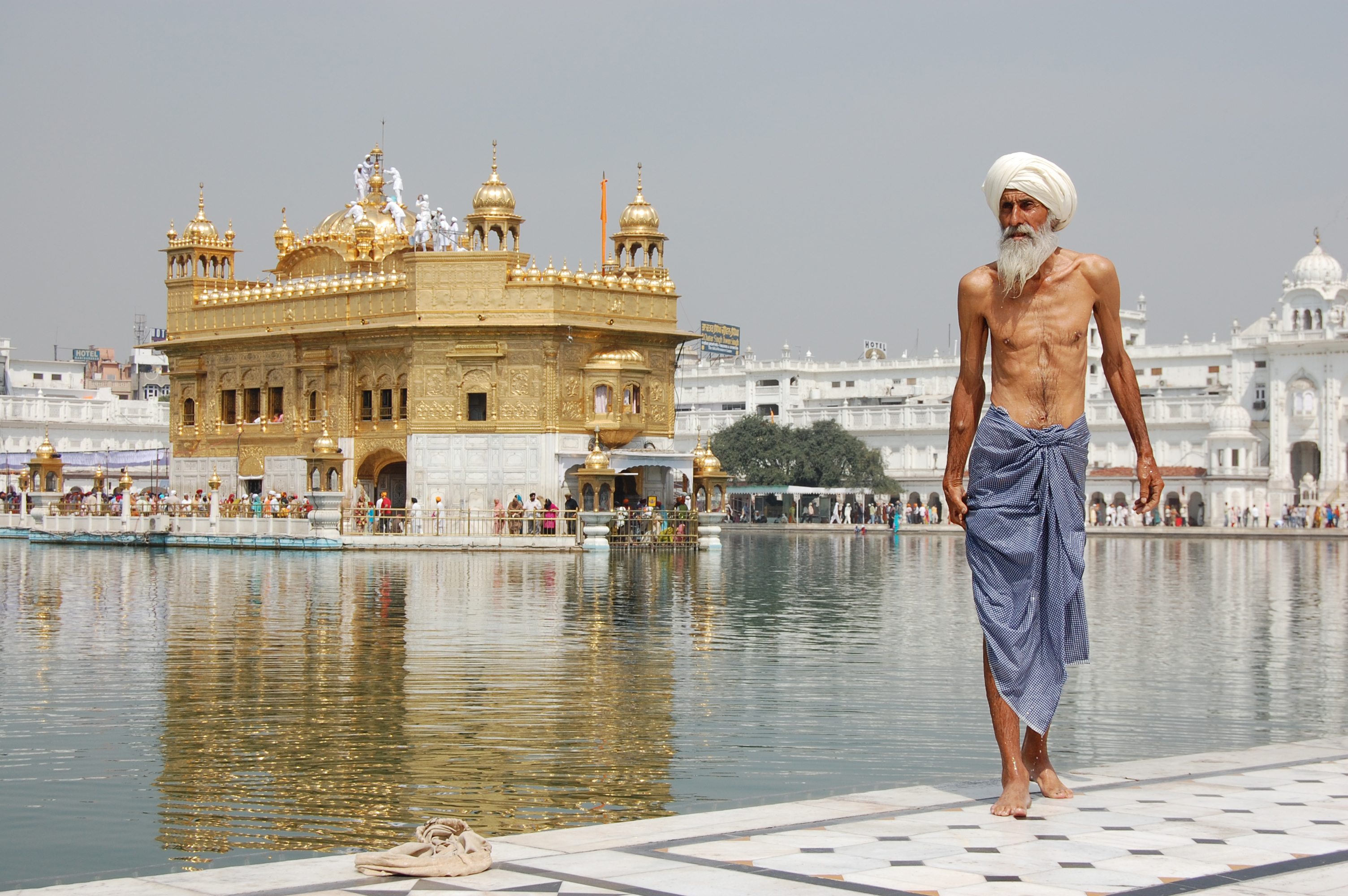
A Sikh pilgrim at the Golden Temple in Amritsar, Punjab

Religion in India is characterised by a diversity of religious beliefs and practices. Throughout India's history, religion has been an important part of the country's culture and the Indian subcontinent is the birthplace of four of the world's major religions, namely Hinduism, Buddhism, Jainism, and Sikhism, which are collectively known as native Indian religions or Dharmic religions and represent approx. 83% of the total population of India.

India has the largest number of followers of Hinduism, Sikhism, Zoroastrianism, Jainism, and the Bahá'í Faith in the world. It further hosts the third most followers of Islam, behind Indonesia and Pakistan, and the ninth largest population of Buddhists.

The Preamble to the Constitution of India states that India is a secular state, and the Constitution of India has declared the right to freedom of religion to be a fundamental right.

According to the 2011 census, 79.8% of the population of India follows Hinduism, 14.2% Islam, 2.3% Christianity, 1.7% Sikhism, 0.7% Buddhism and 0.4% Jainism. Zoroastrianism, Sanamahism and Judaism also have an ancient history in India, and each has several thousands of Indian adherents. India has the largest population of people adhering to both Zoroastrianism (i.e. Parsis and Iranis) and the Bahá'í Faith in the world; these religions are otherwise largely exclusive to their native Iran where they originated from. Several tribal religions are also present in India, such as Donyi-Polo, Sanamahism, Sarnaism, Niamtre, and others.

== Constitutional status ==
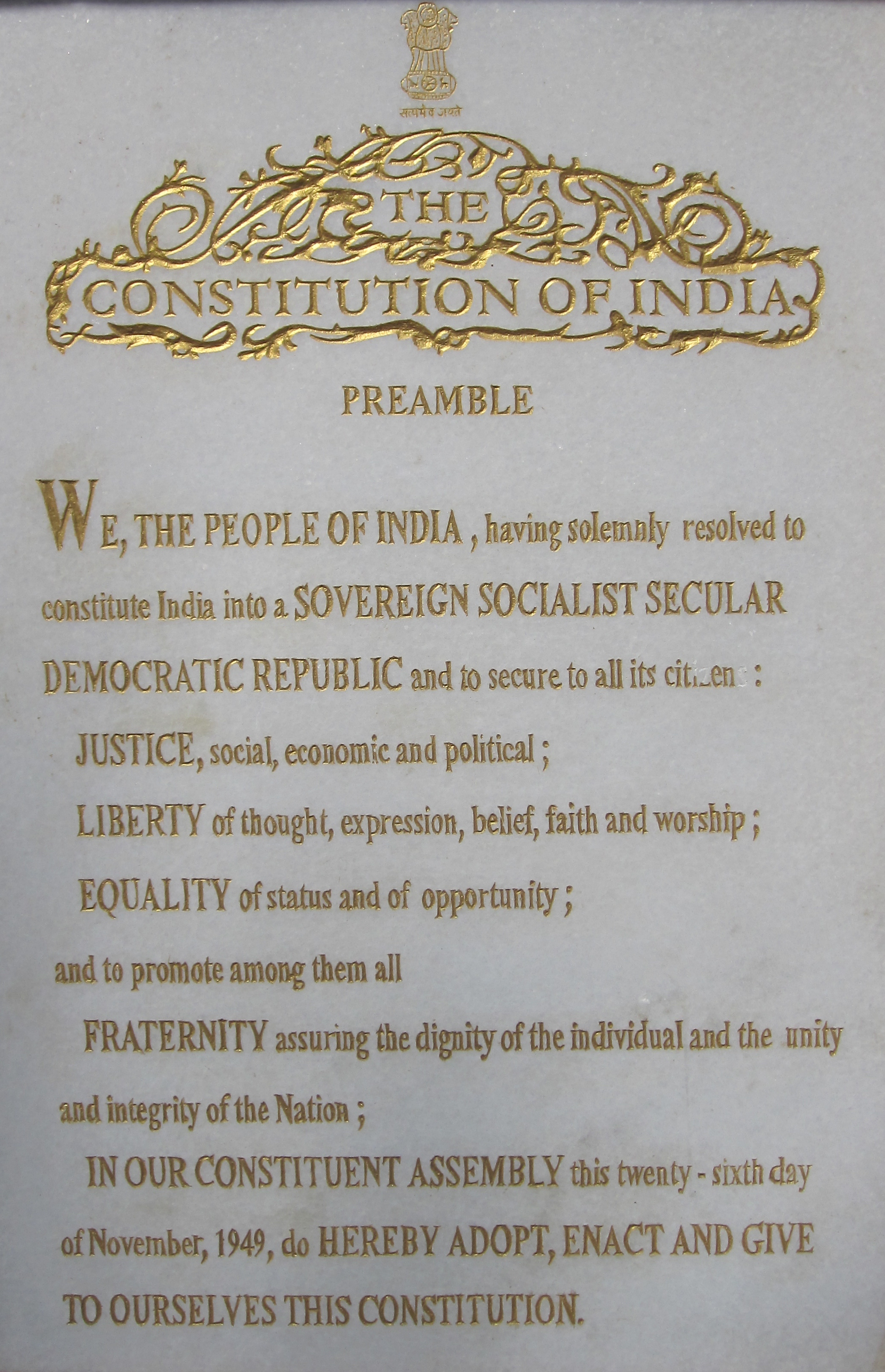
Preamble of the Indian Constitution

The Constitution of India declares India to be a secular state with no state religion. The Forty-second Amendment of the Constitution of India enacted in 1976 asserts the Preamble to the Constitution of India as secular. The Supreme Court of India in the 1994 case S. R. Bommai v. Union of India established that India had been secular since the formation of the Republic on 26 January 1950. Secularism in India is understood to mean not a complete separation of religion from state, but a state that participates in a neutral manner in the affairs of all religious groups and as well as atheism while maintaining equidistance from all.

However, the original copy of the Indian constitution has an illustration of Rama, Sita, and Lakshmana in Part III on Fundamental Rights and Rama has been considered as the true guardian of people's rights. Article 48 of the Indian constitution prohibits the slaughter of cows or calves (a sacred animal in Hinduism) and the same is a criminal offence in most states of India.

Secularism is defined as a basic structure doctrine of the constitution through the argument of Kesavananda Bharati v. State of Kerala case, that cannot be removed or amended by any means. However, there is no mention of the term “Basic Structure” anywhere in the Constitution of India. The idea that the Parliament cannot introduce laws that would amend the basic structure of the constitution have been evolved judicially over time and many cases.

The particular provisions regarding secularism and freedom of religion in India in the constitution are:

- Article 14: grants equality before the law and equal protection of the laws to all.
- Article 15: enlarges the concept of secularism to the widest possible extent by prohibiting discrimination on grounds of religion, race, caste, sex or place of birth.
- Article 25: Freedom of conscience and free profession, practice and propagation of any religion.
- Article 26: Freedom to manage religious affairs.
- Article 27: Freedom as to payment of taxes for promotion of any particular religion.
- Article 28: Freedom as to attendance at religious instruction or religious worship in certain educational institutions.
- Articles 29 and 30: provide cultural and educational rights to the minorities.
- Article 51A: i.e. Fundamental Duties obliges all the citizens to promote harmony and the spirit of common brotherhood and to value and preserve the heritage of the country's composite diverse culture.

== History ==
=== Prehistoric religion ===
Evidence attesting to prehistoric religion in the Indian subcontinent derives from scattered Mesolithic rock paintings depicting dances and rituals. Neolithic pastoralists inhabiting the Indus Valley buried their dead in a manner suggestive of spiritual practices that incorporated notions of an afterlife. Other South Asian Stone Age sites, such as the Bhimbetka rock shelters in central Madhya Pradesh and the Kupgal petroglyphs of eastern Karnataka, contain rock art portraying religious rites and evidence of possible ritualised music.

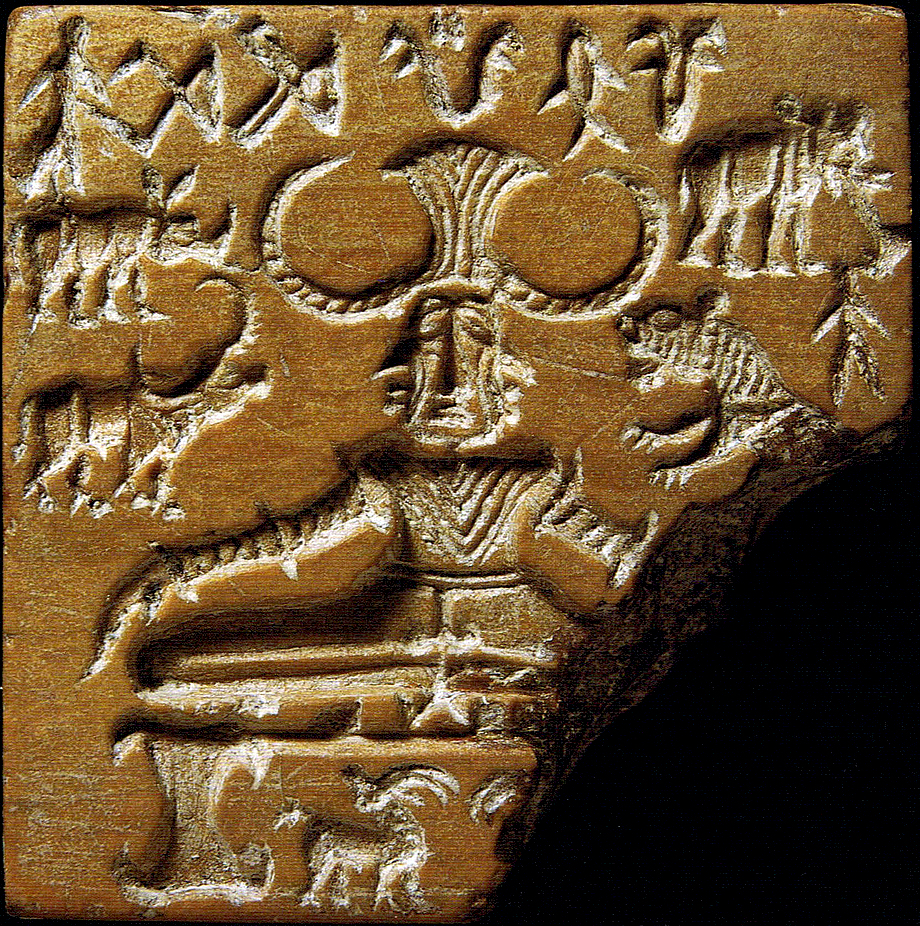
The Pashupati seal, discovered at the Indus Valley Civilization city of Mohenjo-daro

=== Indus Valley Civilisation ===
The Harappan people of the Indus Valley Civilisation, which lasted from 3300 to 1300 BCE and was centered on the Indus and Ghaggar-Hakra river valleys, may have worshiped an important mother goddess symbolising fertility. Excavations of Indus Civilisation sites show seals with animals and "fire‑altars", indicating rituals associated with fire. A Shivlinga of a type similar to that which is now worshiped by Hindus has also been found, however this interpretation has been disputed by Srinivasan.

=== Evolution of Hinduism ===
Hinduism is often regarded as the oldest surviving religion in the world, with roots tracing back to prehistoric times, over 5,000 years ago. Hinduism spread through parts of Southeastern Asia, China, and Afghanistan. Hindus worship a single divine entity (paramatma, lit."first-soul") with different forms.

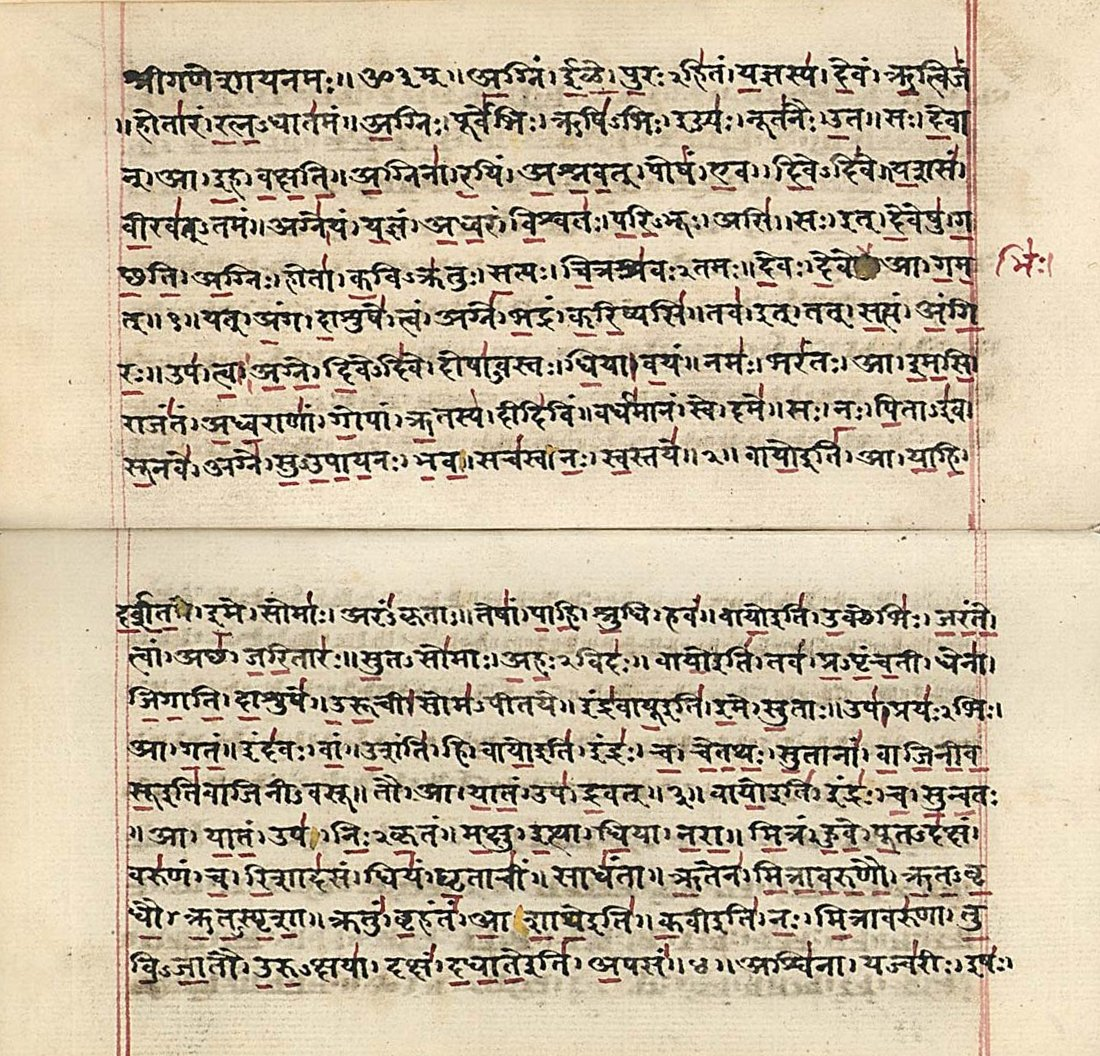
An early 19th century manuscript of the Rigveda written in Devanagari

Hinduism's origins include the cultural elements of the Indus Valley Civilisation along with other Indian civilisations. The oldest surviving text of Hinduism is the Rigveda, produced during the Vedic period and dating to 1700–1100 BCE. During the Epic and Puranic periods, the earliest versions of the epic poems, in their current form including Ramayana and Mahabharata were written roughly from 500 to 100 BCE, although these were orally transmitted through families for centuries prior to this period.

After 200 BCE, several schools of thought were formally codified in the Indian philosophy, including Samkhya, Yoga, Nyaya, Vaisheshika, Purva-Mimamsa, and Vedanta.

=== Rise of Śramaṇa religions ===
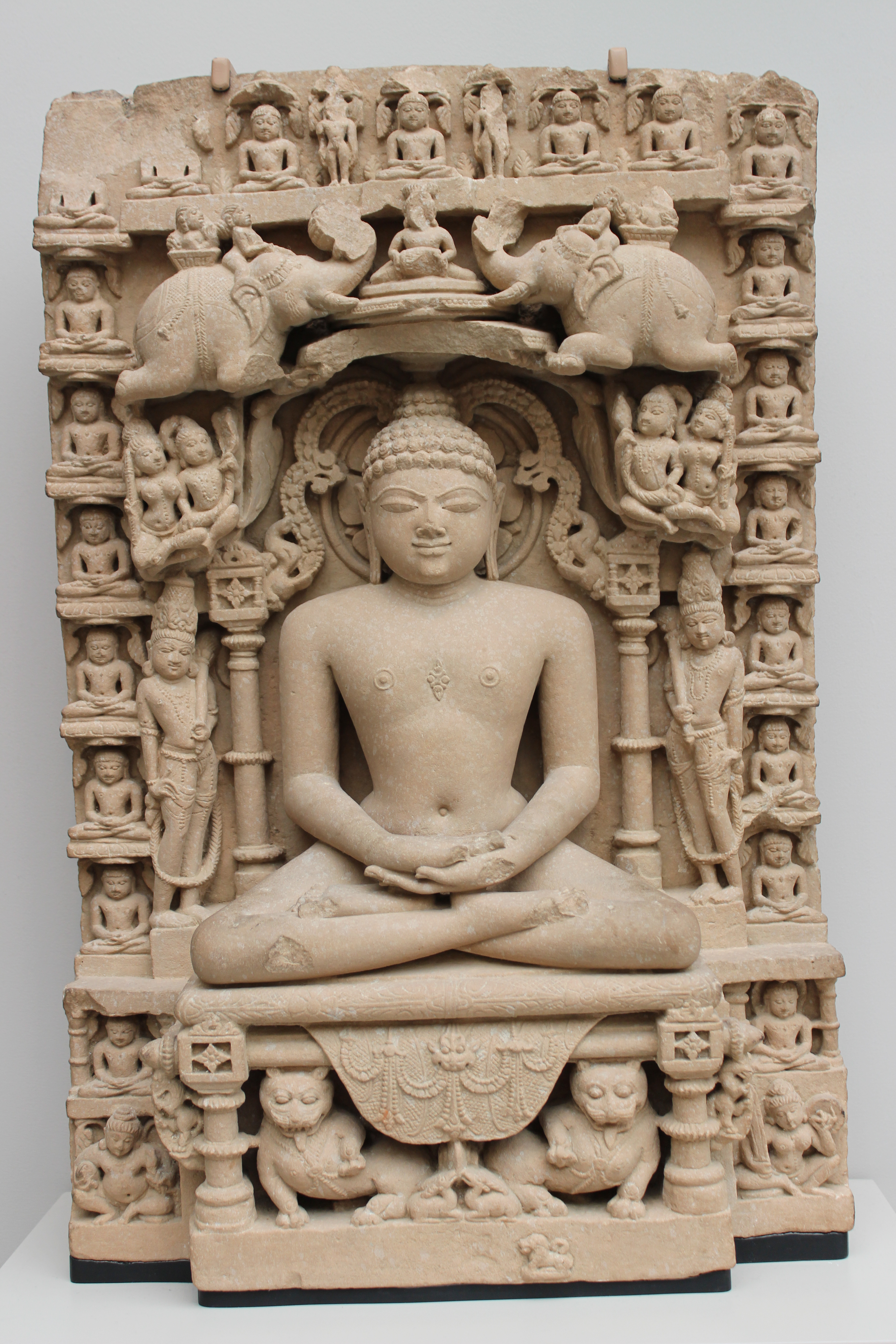
A statue of 24th and last Jain Tirthankar, Mahavira

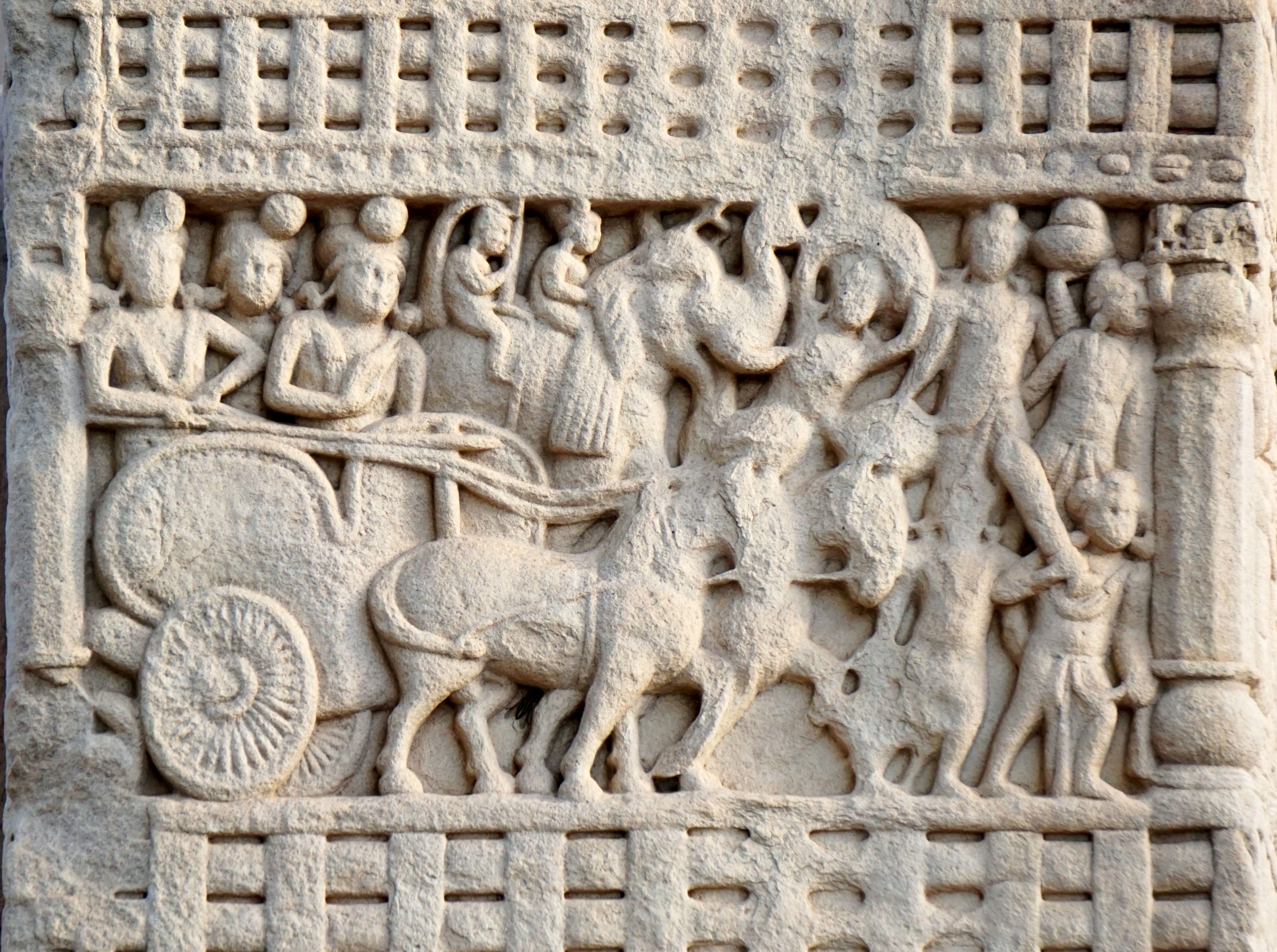
A carving of Ashoka at Sanchi. Ashoka is credited with promoting the spread of Buddhism in India and throughout Asia.

The Śramaṇa tradition includes Jainism, known endonymically as Jain Dharm, and Buddhism known endonymically as Bauddh Dharm, and others such as the Ājīvikas, Ajñanas, and others.

The historical roots of Jainism in India have been traced to the 9th century BCE with the rise of Parshvanatha, the 23rd Tirthankara, and his Jain philosophy, and to Mahavira (599–527 BCE), the 24th Jain Tirthankara. Jainism traces its roots further back to the first Tirthankara, Rishabhanatha. Mahavira stressed on the five vows.

Gautama Buddha, who founded Buddhism, was born to the Shakya clan just before Magadha (which lasted from 546 to 324 BCE) rose to power. His family was native to the plains of Lumbini, in what is now southern Nepal. Indian Buddhism peaked during the reign of Ashoka the Great of the Maurya Empire, who patronised Buddhism following his conversion and unified the Indian subcontinent in the 3rd century BCE. He sent missionaries abroad, allowing Buddhism to spread across Asia. Indian Buddhism declined following the loss of royal patronage offered by the Kushan Empire and such kingdoms as Magadha and Kosala.

The decline of Buddhism in India has been attributed to a variety of factors, which include the resurgence of Hinduism in the 10th and 11th centuries under Sankaracharya, the later Turkish invasion, the Buddhist focus on renunciation as opposed to familial values and private property, Hinduism's own use and appropriation of Buddhist and Jain ideals of renunciation and ahimsa, and others. Although Buddhism virtually disappeared from mainstream India by the 11th century CE, its presence remained and manifested itself through other movements such as the Bhakti tradition, Vaishnavism, and the Bauls of Bengal, who are influenced by the Sahajjyana form of Buddhism that was popular in Bengal during the Pala period.

=== Bhakti movement ===
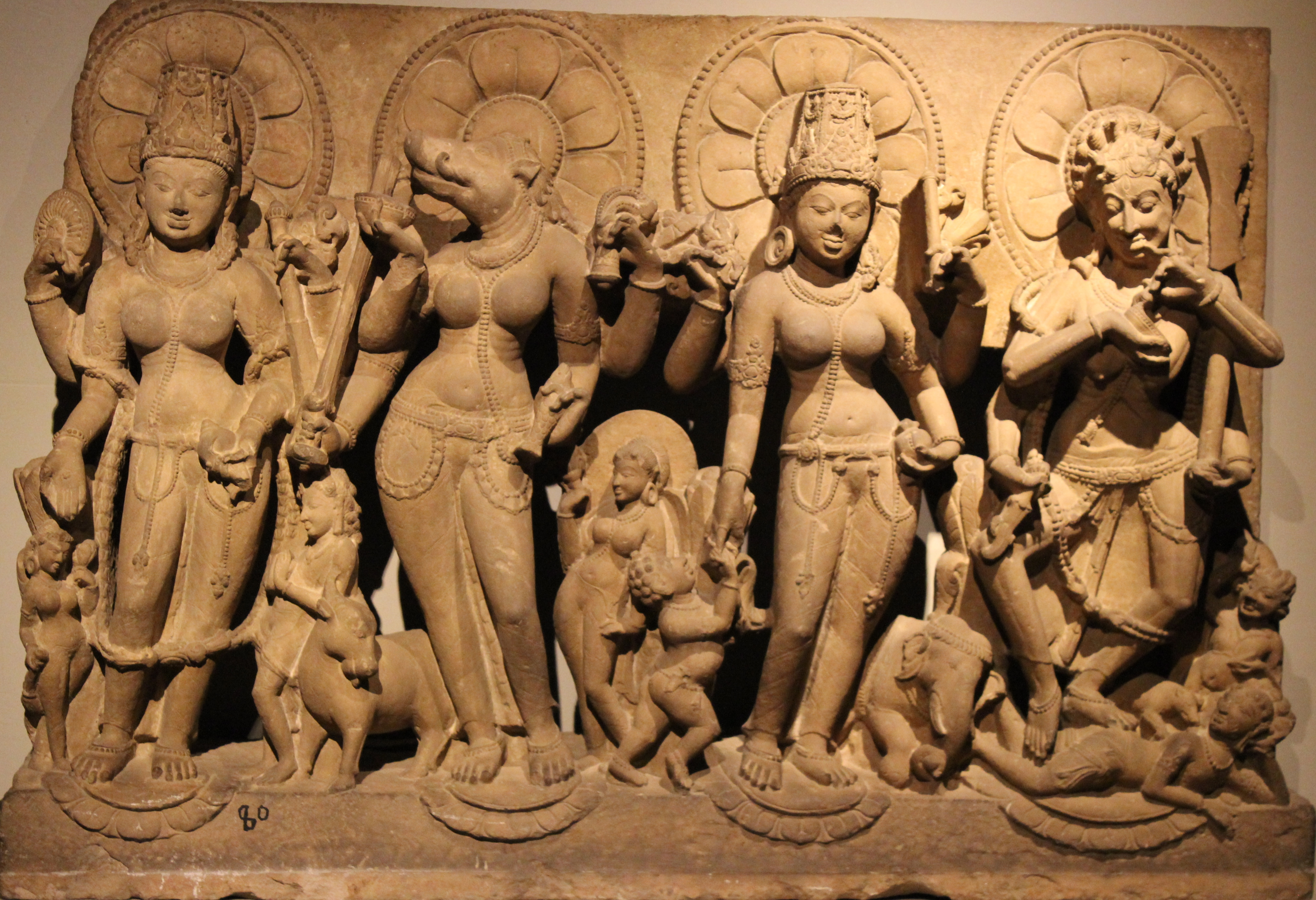
A relief depicting Hindu goddesses (from left to right) Vaishnavi, Varahi, Indrani, and Chamunda; National Museum of India

During the 14th–17th centuries, when North India was under Muslim rule, the Bhakti movement swept through Central and Northern India. The Bhakti movement actually started in the eighth century in south India (present-day Tamil Nadu and Kerala), and gradually spread northwards. It was initiated by a loosely associated group of teachers or saints. Dnyaneshwar, Chaitanya Mahaprabhu, Vallabhacharya, Surdas, Meera Bai, Kabir, Tulsidas, Ravidas, Namdeo, Eknath, Ramdas, Tukaram, and other mystics were some of the saints in the North. They taught that people could cast aside the heavy burdens of ritual and caste and the subtle complexities of philosophy, and simply express their overwhelming love for God. This period was also characterised by an abundance of devotional literature in vernacular prose and poetry in the ethnic languages of the various Indian states or provinces. The Bhakti movement gave rise to several different movements throughout India

During the Bhakti movement, many Hindu groups regarded as outside the traditional Hindu caste system followed Bhakti traditions by worshipping/following saints belonging to their respective communities. For example, Guru Ravidas was a Chamar of Uttar Pradesh; Guru Parsuram Ramnami was a Chura of Chhattisgarh, and Maharishi Ram Naval was a Bhangi of Rajasthan. In their lifetimes, several of these saints even went to the extent of fighting conversion from foreign missionaries, encouraging only Hinduism within their communities. In Assam for example, tribals were led by Gurudev Kalicharan Bramha of the Brahmo Samaj; in Nagaland by Kacha Naga; and in Central India by Birsa Munda, Hanuman Aaron, Jatra Bhagat, and Budhu Bhagat.

==== Kabir Sect ====
The Kabir Panth is a religious movement based on the teachings of the Indian poet saint Kabir (1398–1518).

Kabir sermonised a monotheism that appealed clearly to the poor and convinced them of their access to god with no liaison. He denied both Hinduism and Islam, as well as meaningless religious rituals, and condemned double standards. This infuriated the orthodox aristocracy. No one could frighten Kabir who was bold enough to stand up for himself and his beliefs.

The Kabir Panth considers Kabir as its principal guru or even as a divinity—truth incarnate. Kabir's influence is testimony to his massive authority, even for those whose beliefs and practices he condemned so unsparingly. For Sikhs he is a forerunner and converser of Nanak, the originating Sikh Guru (spiritual guide). Muslims place him in Sufi (mystical) lineages, and for Hindus he becomes a Vaishnavite with universalist leanings.

=== Sikhism ===
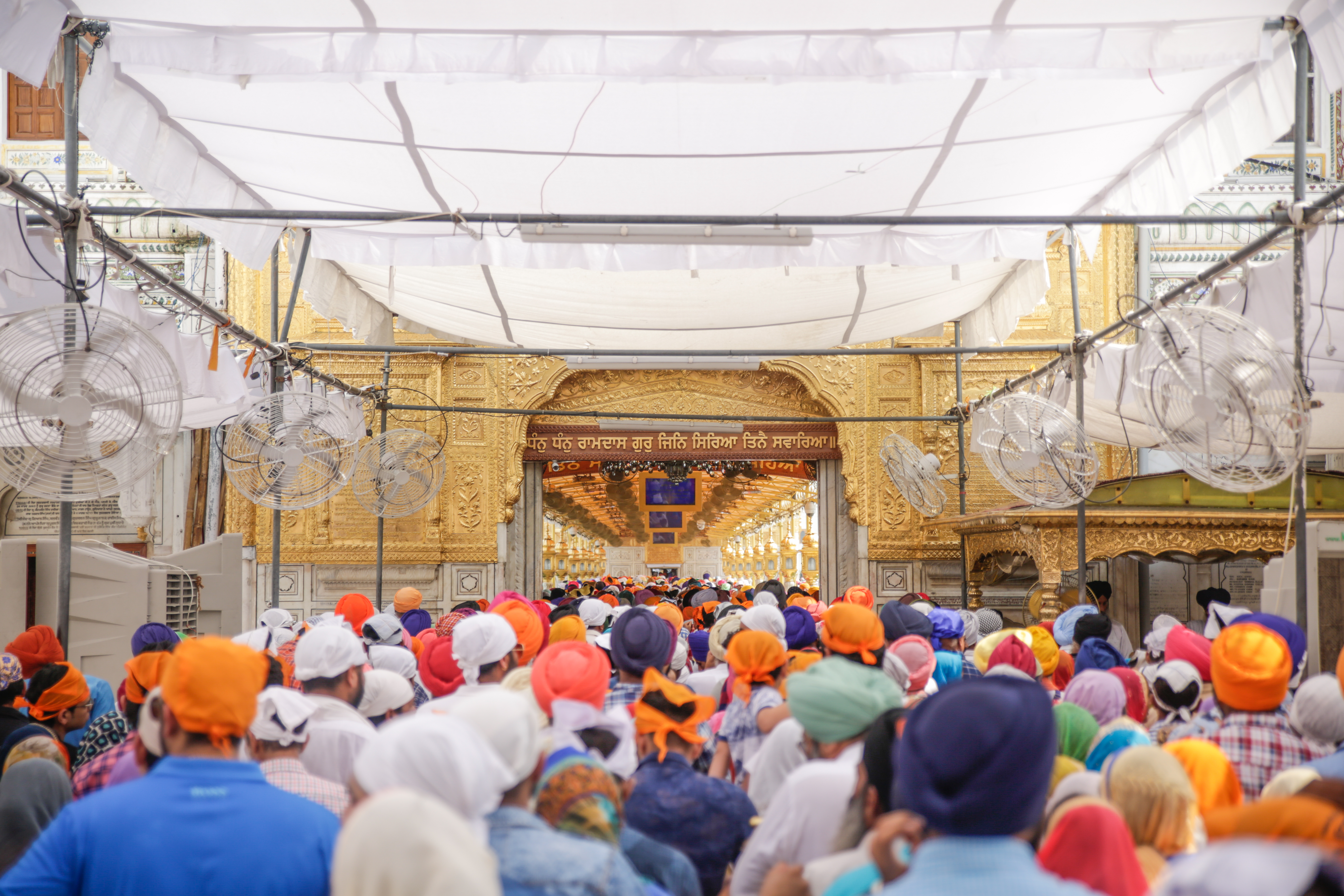
Sikh pilgrims at the causeway to the sanctum of the Harmandir Sahib, the holiest Sikh Gurdwara

Guru Nanak Dev Ji (1469–1539) was the founder of Sikhism, known endonymically as Sikh Dharm. The Guru Granth Sahib was first compiled by the fifth Sikh guru, Guru Arjan Dev, from the writings of the first five Sikh gurus and others saints who preached the concept of universal brotherhood, including those of the Hindu and Muslim faith. Before the death of Guru Gobind Singh, the Guru Granth Sahib was declared the eternal guru. Sikhism recognises all humans as equal before Waheguru, regardless of colour, caste, or lineage. Sikhism strongly rejects the beliefs of fasting (vrata), superstitions, idol worship, and circumcision. The Sikhs believe in one eternal god and follow the teachings of the 10 gurus, the 5 K's of Sikhism, the hukums of Guru Gobind Singh, Sikh Rehat Maryada, and Nitnem.

=== Introduction of Abrahamic religions ===
==== Judaism ====
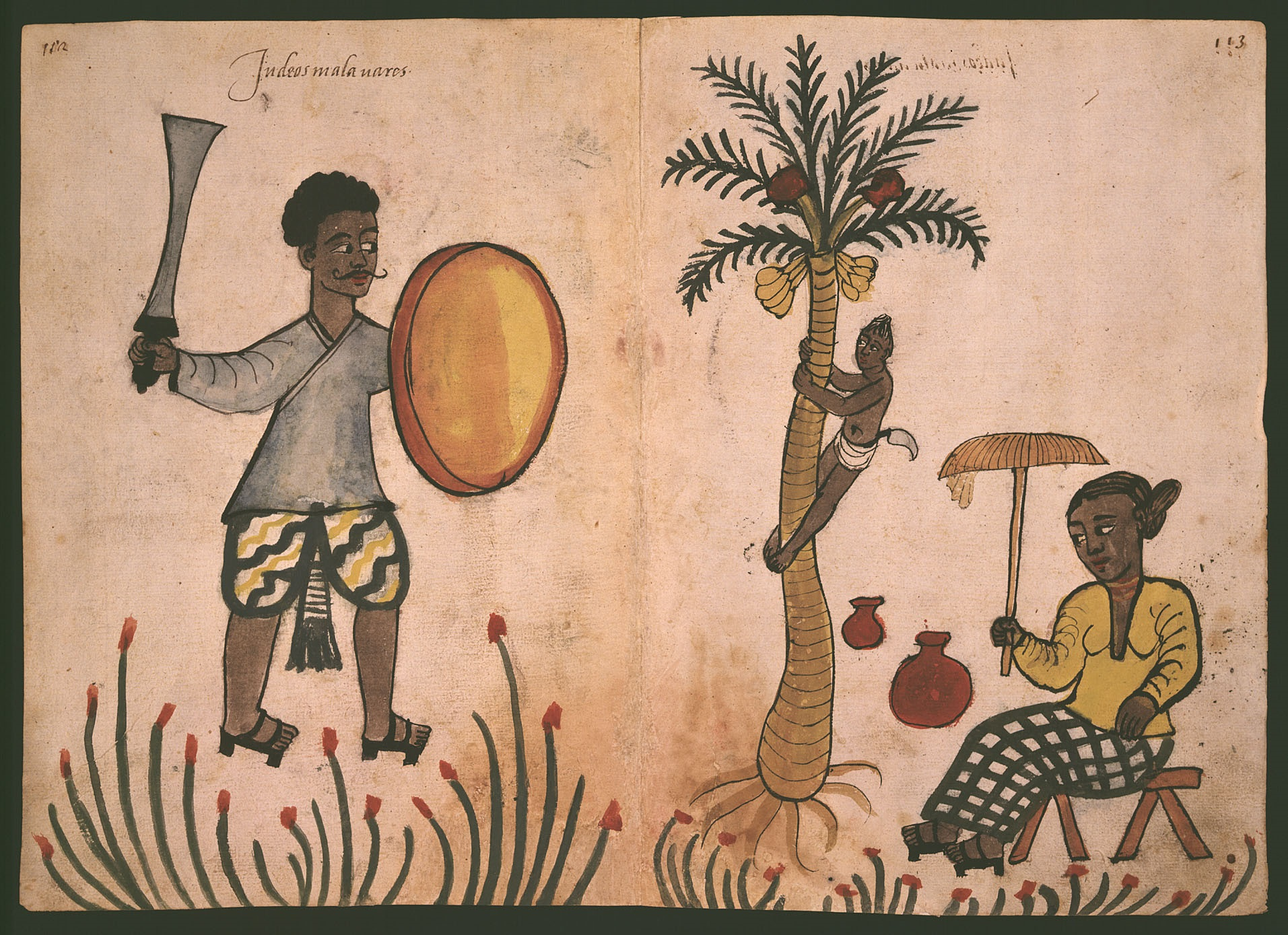
Jewish family from Malabar, 1540

Jews first arrived as traders from Judea in the city of Kochi, Kerala, in 562 BCE. More Jews came as exiles from Jerusalem in the year 70 CE, after the destruction of the Second Temple.

==== Christianity ====
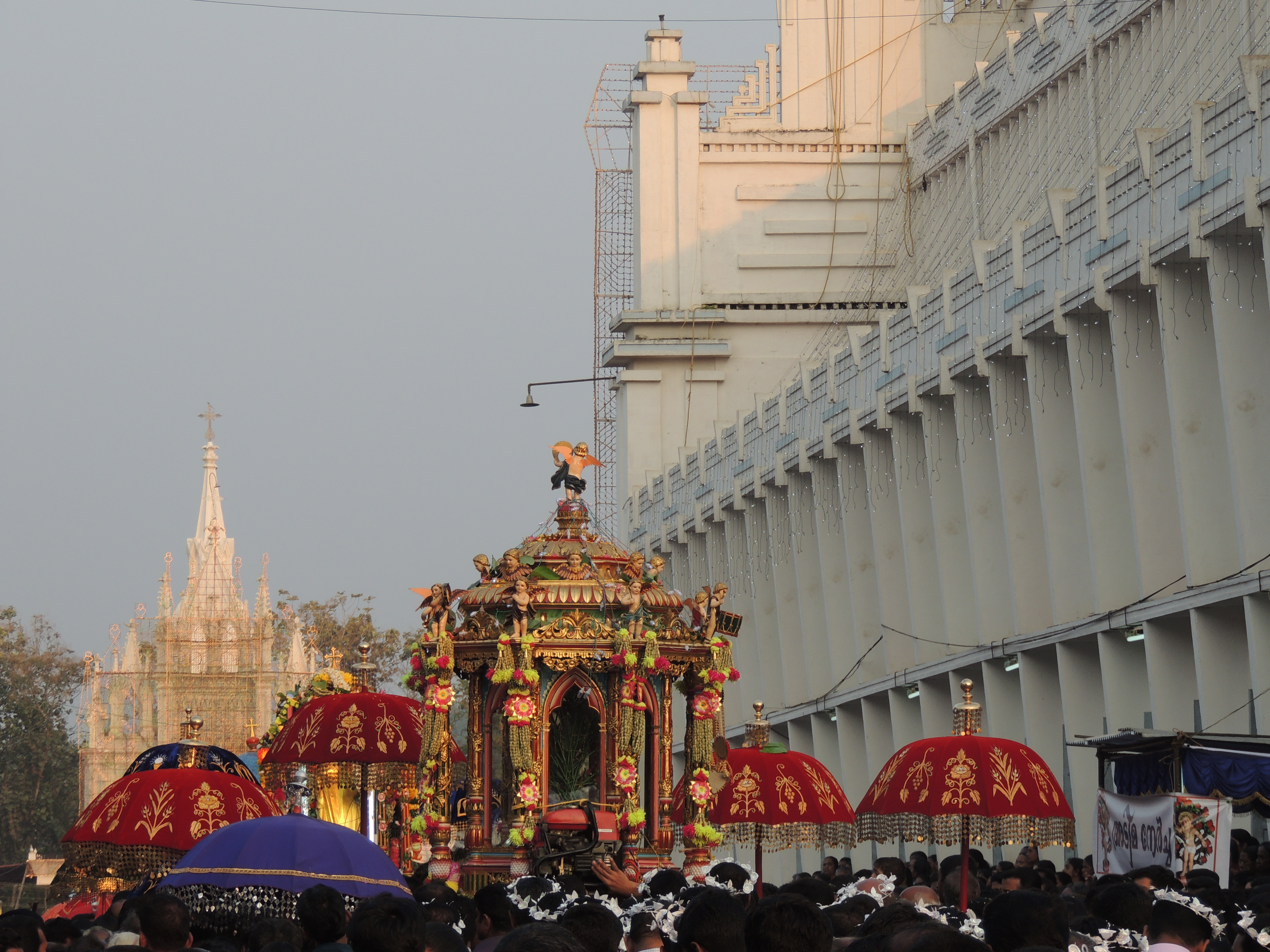
A procession during the Feast of St Sebastian at St Mary's Forane Church, Athirampuzha, Kerala

Christianity was believed to be introduced to India by Thomas the Apostle (a direct disciple of Jesus Christ), who visited Muziris in Kerala in 52 CE and proselytised natives, who are known as Saint Thomas Christians (also known as Syrian Christians or Nasrani) today. India's oldest church, the world's oldest existing church structure is believed to be built by Thomas the Apostle in 57 CE, called Thiruvithamcode Arappally or Thomaiyar or Kovil as named by the then Chera king Udayancheral, is located at Thiruvithancode in Kanyakumari (Cape Comorin) district of Tamil Nadu, it was declared an international St Thomas Pilgrim Centre. There is a general scholarly consensus that Christianity was rooted in India by the 6th century CE, including some communities who used Syriac liturgically. Christianity in India consists of various denominations such as the Assyrian Church, Catholicism, Protestantism, Oriental Orthodoxy and others.

Most Christians live in South India, particularly in Kerala, Tamil Nadu, Goa, and the average number of Christians is at 3.45% in areas such as Bombay (Mumbai). There are also large Christian populations in Northeast India. Catholic Christianity was spread in the 16th century, particularly by the Portuguese in Goa and Bombay. Protestantism was introduced by Protestant missionaries in the 18th century.

==== Islam ====
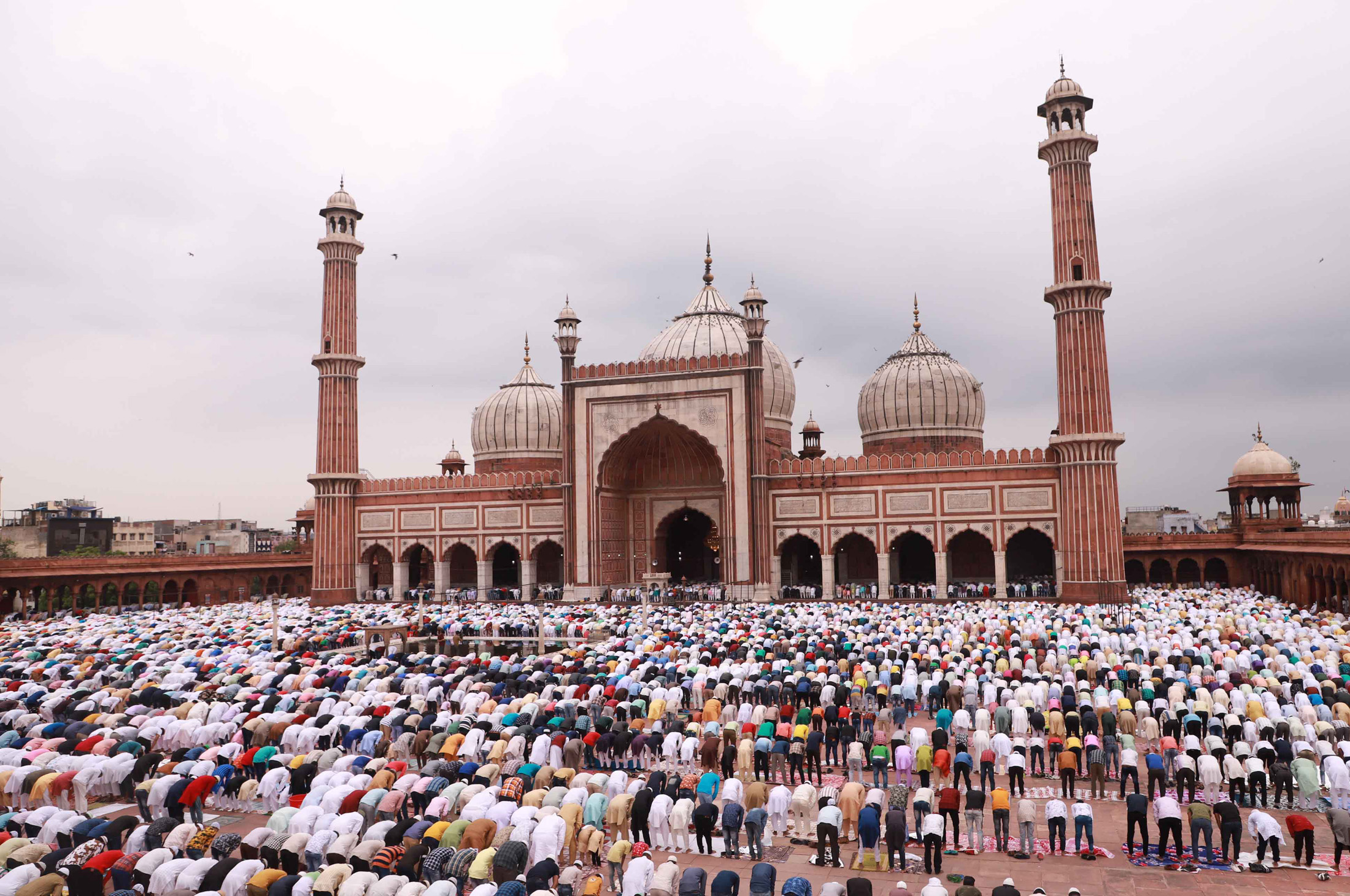
Muslims praying at Jama Masjid in Delhi, one of the largest mosques in India.

Islam came to India in the early 7th century through the Arab traders in Malabar coast. It started to become a major religion during the Muslim rule in the Indian subcontinent. The Cheraman Juma Mosque is the first mosque in India located in Methala, Kodungallur Taluk, Thrissur District in Kerala. A legend claims that it was built in 629 CE, which makes it the oldest mosque in the Indian subcontinent which is still in use. The growth of Islam in India mostly took place under the Delhi Sultanate (1206–1526) and the Mughal Empire (1526–1858), greatly aided by the mystic Sufi tradition. The growth of Islam was regionally uneven, and Islam had the greatest appeal to those who were not, or only superficially integrated into the Brahmanical fold, as in the case of Bengal.

Currently, Islam is the second largest religion in India, with 14.2% of the country's population or roughly 172 million people identifying as adherents of Islam (2011 census). The estimated number of Muslims in India for 2024 is projected to be around 204,760,392.

It makes India the country with the largest Muslim population outside Muslim-majority countries

== Census statistics ==
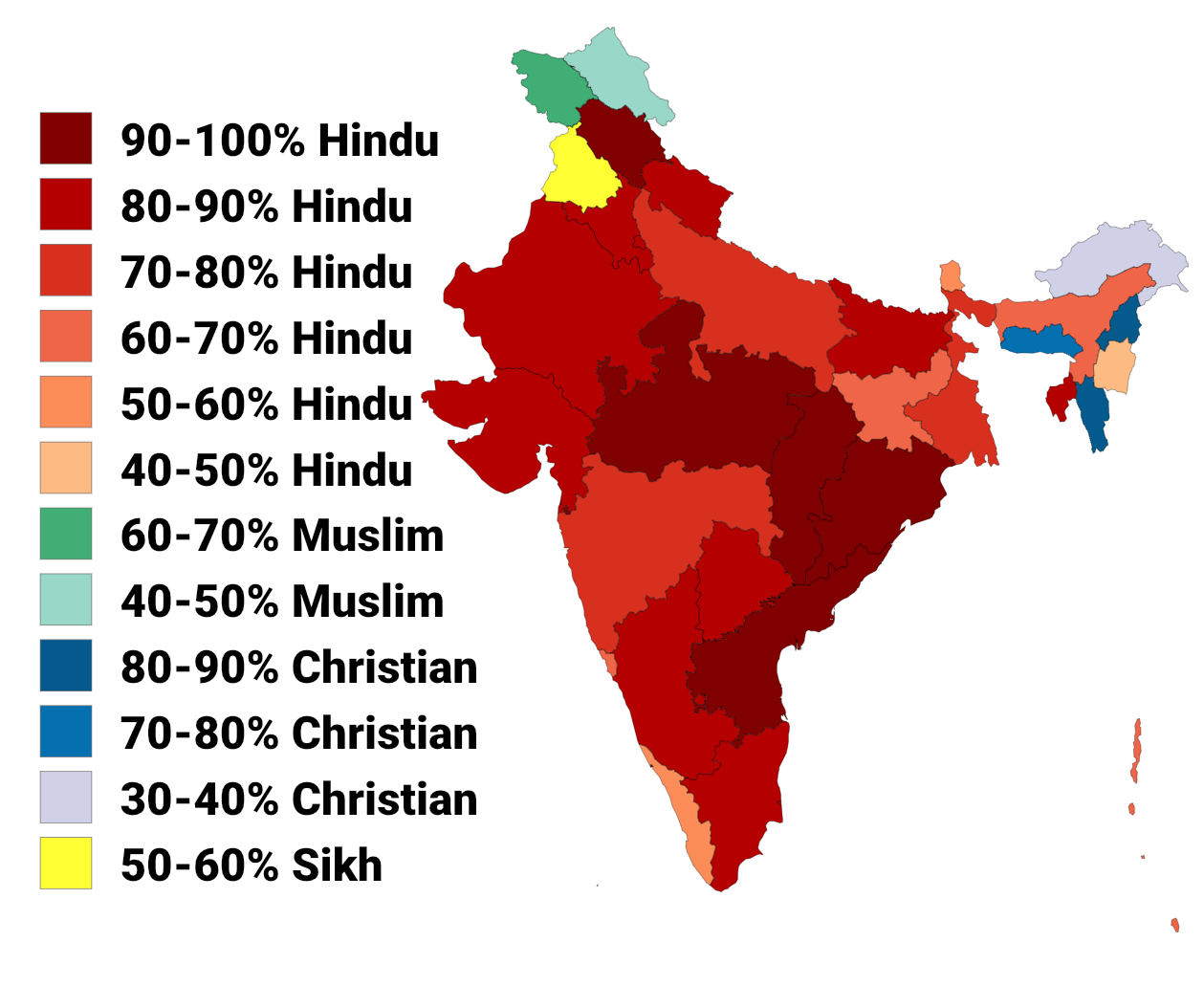
Largest religion in India by administrative division, 2011 census

India's Religious diversity as of the 2011 census
Religion (Note: Major denominations with over 1 million adherents.)	Population	%
Hindus	966,257,353	79.8%
Muslims	172,245,158	14.2%
Christians	27,819,588	2.3%
Sikhs	20,833,116	1.72%
Buddhists	8,442,972	0.7%
Sarnaism	4,957,467	0.41%
Jains	4,451,753	0.37%
Gondi (Koyapunem)	1,026,344	0.08%
Other religious beliefs (Note: Other religious beliefs comprising nearly 80 denominations, each with a population between 100 and 800,000. See also Tribal religions in India)	1,953,923	0.16%
Not stated	2,867,303	0.24%
Total	1,210,854,977	100%

There are six religions in India which have been awarded "National minority" status—Muslims, Christians, Sikhs, Jains, Buddhists, and Zoroastrians (Parsis).

Population trends for major religious groups in India (1951–2011)
Religious group	Population % (of total population) as per census							Change in growth rate since 1951
Religious group	1951	1961	1971	1981	1991	2001	2011	Change in growth rate since 1951
Hinduism	84.1%	83.45%	82.73%	82.30%	81.53%	80.46%	79.80%	▼5.12%
Islam	9.8%	10.69%	11.21%	11.75%	12.61%	13.43%	14.23%	▲45.21%
Christianity	2.3%	2.44%	2.60%	2.44%	2.32%	2.34%	2.37%	▲3.04%
Sikhism	1.79%	1.79%	1.89%	1.92%	1.94%	1.87%	1.72%	▼3.91%
Buddhism	0.74%	0.74%	0.70%	0.70%	0.77%	0.77%	0.70%	▼5.41%
Jainism	0.46%	0.46%	0.48%	0.47%	0.40%	0.41%	0.37%	▼19.56%
Zoroastrianism	0.13%	0.09%	0.09%	0.09%	0.08%	0.06%	0.05%	▼61.53%
Atheism or other religion	0.8%	0.8%	0.41%	0.42%	0.44%	0.8%	0.9%	▲12.51%

The following is a breakdown of India's religious communities:

Characteristics of religious groups
Religious group	Population (2011) %	Growth (2001–2011)	Sex ratio (2011) (females per 1000 males)				Literacy (2011) (%)	Work participation (2011) (%)
Religious group	Population (2011) %	Growth (2001–2011)	total	rural	urban	child	Literacy (2011) (%)	Work participation (2011) (%)
Hinduism	79.80%	16.8%	939	946	921	913	73.3%	41.0%
Islam	14.23%	24.6%	951	957	941	943	68.5%	32.6%
Christianity	2.30%	15.5%	1023	1008	1046	958	84.5%	41.9%
Sikhism	1.72%	8.4%	903	905	898	828	75.4%	36.3%
Buddhism	0.70%	6.1%	965	960	973	933	81.3%	43.1%
Jainism	0.37%	5.4%	954	935	959	889	94.9%	35.5%
Others/Religion not specified	0.90%	n/a	959	947	975	974	n/a	n/a

Note: When compared with 2001, India's population rose by 17.7% in 2011 with an average sex ratio of 943 and a literacy rate of 74.4%. The average work participation stood at 39.79%.

== Hinduism ==
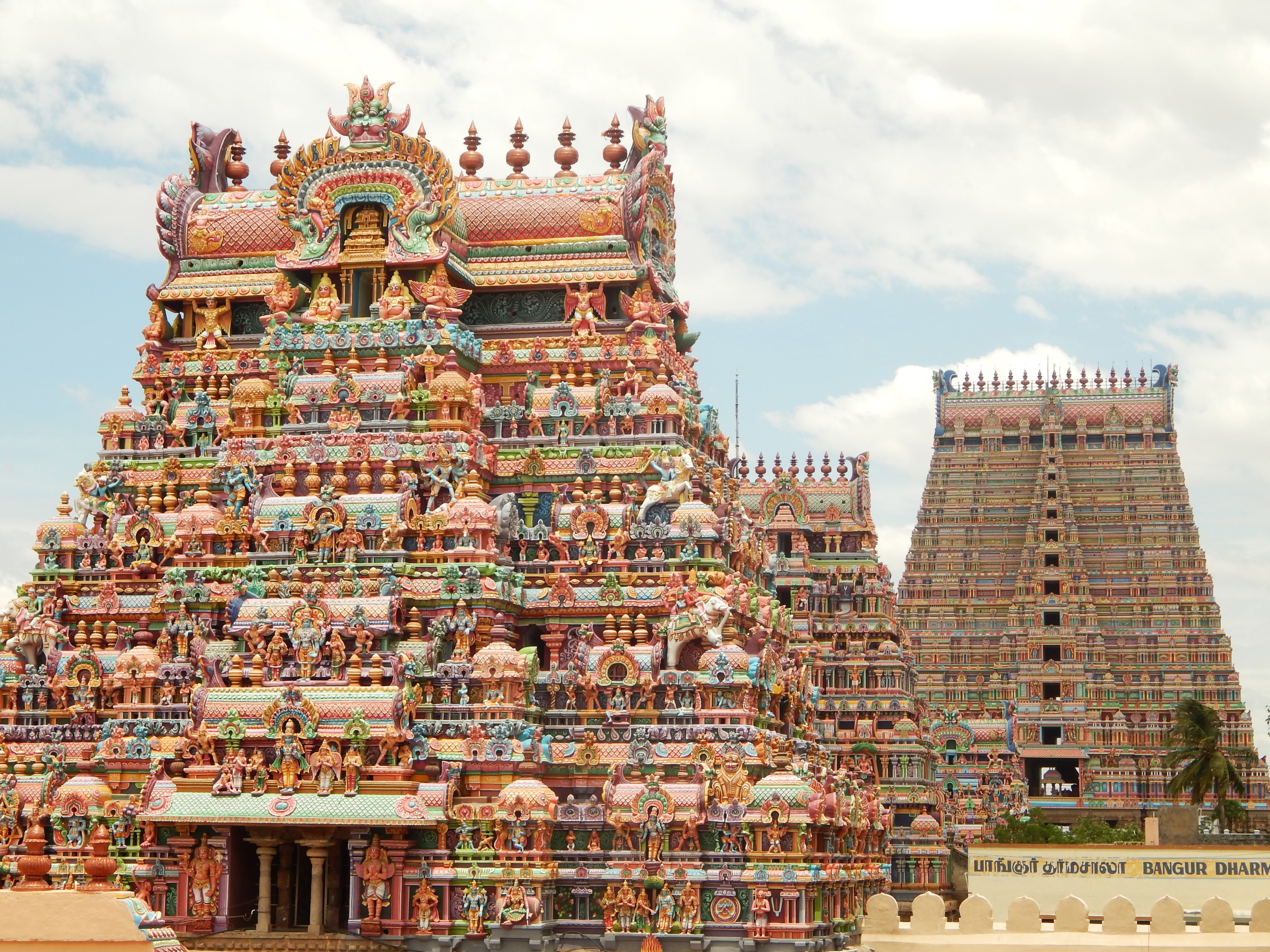
Ranganathaswamy Temple, Srirangam

Hinduism is an ancient religion with the largest religious grouping in India, with around 966 million adherents as of 2011, composing 79.8% of the population. Hinduism is diverse, with monotheism, henotheism, polytheism, panentheism, pantheism, monism, atheism, animism, agnosticism, and gnosticism being represented. The term Hindu, originally a geographical description, derives from the Sanskrit, Sindhu (the historical appellation for the Indus River), and refers to a person from the land of the river Sindhu. Hindus following the traditional religion call it Sanatana Dharma (or "Eternal Way"). The adherents of Sanatana Dharma call themselves as "Sanatani", the original word for the adherents of Sanatana Dharma.

== Religious minorities ==
=== Islam ===
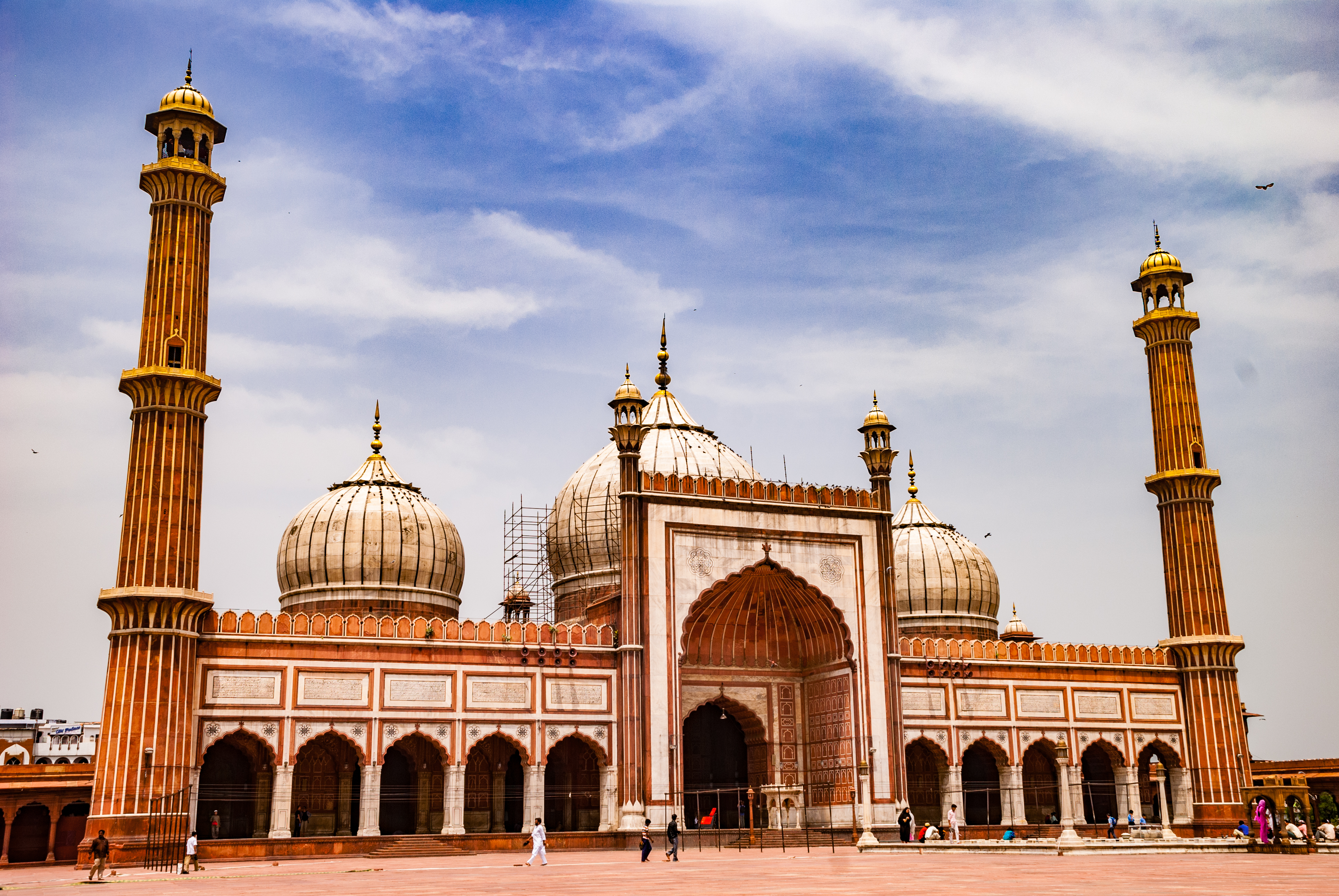
Jama Masjid, Delhi

Islam is a monotheistic religion centered on the belief in one God and following the example of Muhammad; it is the largest minority religion in India. About 14.2% of the country's population or approximately 172.2 million people identify as adherents of Islam (2011 census). It makes India the country with the largest Muslim population outside Muslim-majority countries, and third among all countries. Muslims are a majority in states Jammu and Kashmir and Lakshadweep, and live in high concentrations in Uttar Pradesh, Bihar, West Bengal, Assam, and Kerala. There has been no particular census conducted in India with regards to sects, but sources suggest the largest denomination is Sunni Islam, with substantial populations of Shia and Ahmadiyya Muslims. Indian sources like Times of India and DNA reported the Indian Shia Muslims population in mid-2005–2006 to be between 25% and 31% of entire Muslim population of India, which accounts them in numbers between 40 and 50 million.

=== Christianity ===
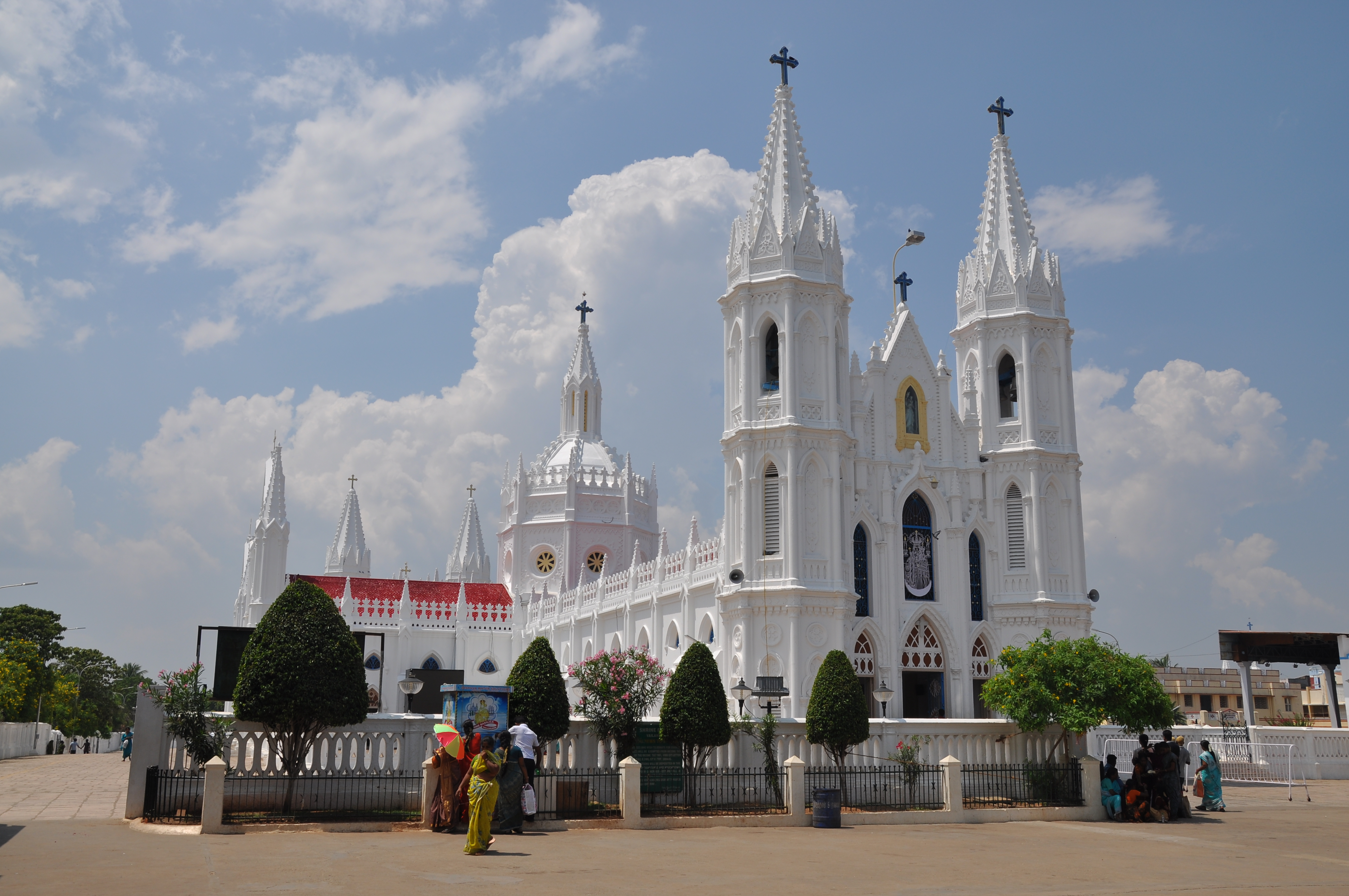
The Basilica of Our Lady of Good Health of Velankanni, in Tamil Nadu, is a devoted Catholic Marian shrine.

Christianity is a monotheistic religion centred on the life and teachings of Jesus as presented in the New Testament. It is the third largest religion of India, making up 2.3% of the population. St. Thomas is credited with introduction of Christianity in India. He arrived on the Malabar Coast in 52 CE. The tradition of origin among Saint Thomas Christians relates to the arrival of Saint Thomas, one of the 12 disciples of Jesus at the ancient seaport Muziris on the Kerala coast in 52 CE. The families Sankaramangalam, Pakalomattam, Kalli, and Kaliyankal were considered particularly preeminent, and historically the most aristocratic Syriac Christian families tended to claim descent from these families.

It is also possible for Aramaic-speaking Jews from Galilee to make a trip to Kerala in the 1st century. The Cochin Jews are known to have existed in Kerala around that time. The earliest known source connecting the apostle to India is the Acts of Thomas, likely written in the early 3rd century, perhaps in Edessa.

Marth Mariam Syro-Malabar Catholic Forane Church, Arakuzha was founded in 999.

The text describes Thomas' adventures in bringing Christianity to India, a tradition later expanded upon in early Indian sources such as the "Thomma Parvam" ("Song of Thomas"). Generally he is described as arriving in or around Maliankara and founding Seven Churches and half churches, or Ezharapallikal: Kodungallur, Kollam, Niranam, Nilackal (Chayal), Kokkamangalam, Kottakkavu, Palayoor, Thiruvithamcode Arappalli and Aruvithura church (half church). A number of 3rd- and 4th-century Roman writers also mention Thomas' trip to India, including Ambrose of Milan, Gregory of Nazianzus, Jerome, and Ephrem the Syrian, while Eusebius of Caesarea records that his teacher Pantaenus visited a Christian community in India in the 2nd century. There came into existence a Christian community who were mainly merchants.

Christianity expanded in the rest of India during the period of British colonial rule. Christians constitute the majority of natives of Nagaland and Mizoram as well as of Meghalaya and have significant populations in Manipur, Goa, Kerala and Mumbai.

=== Sikhism ===
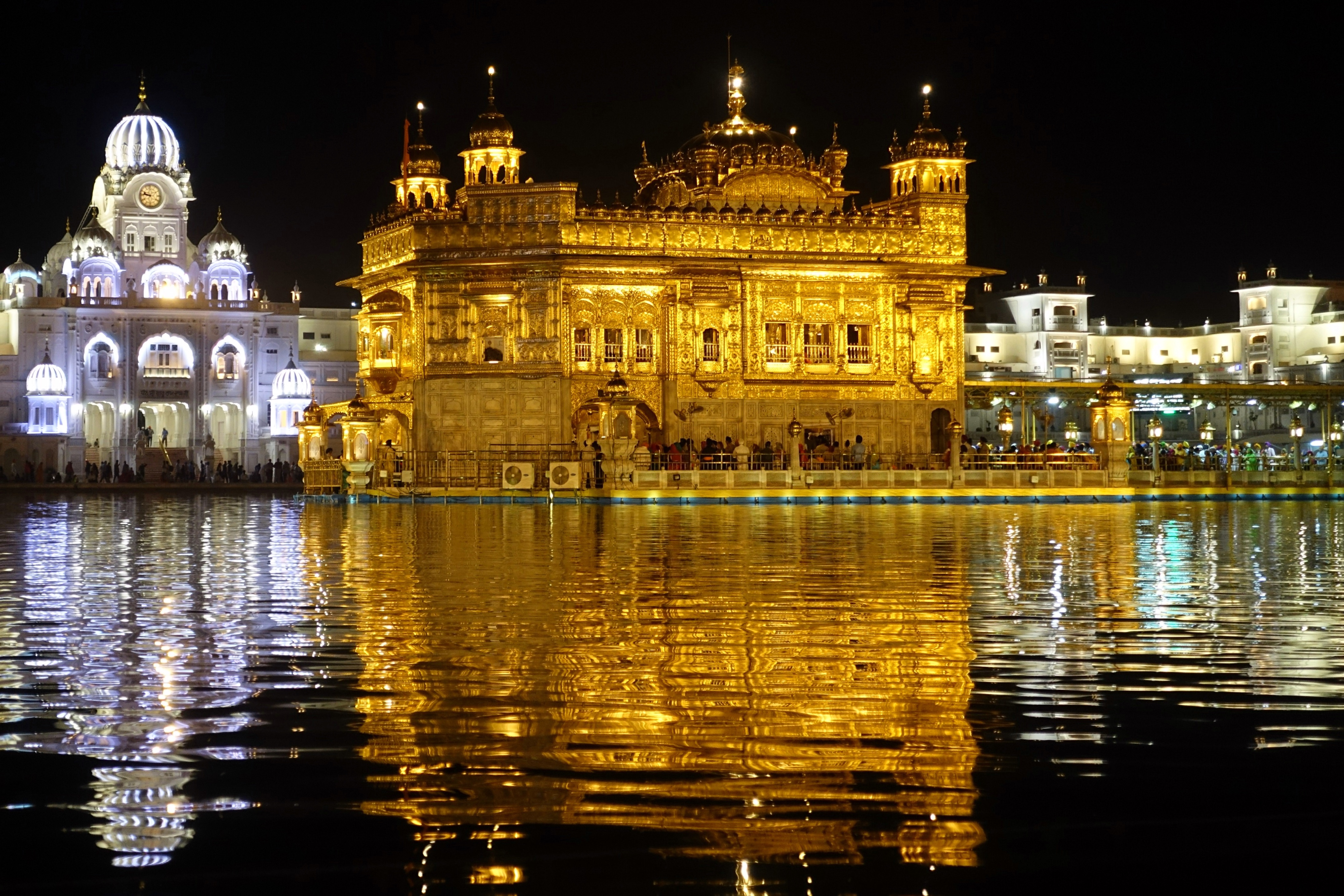
Siri Harmandir Sahib (Golden Temple)

Sikhism is a monotheistic religion that began in fifteenth-century Punjab with the teachings of Guru Nanak and nine successive Sikh gurus. As of 2011, there were 20.8 million Sikhs in India. Punjab is the spiritual home of Sikhs, and is the only state in India where Sikhs form a majority. There are also significant populations of Sikhs in neighbouring Chandigarh, Himachal Pradesh, Jammu division of Jammu and Kashmir, Delhi, and Haryana. These areas were historically a part of Greater Punjab. However, there is no data for specific number of Nanak followers (Nanakpanthis) in India, but they are believed to be in crores somewhere around 14 crores. Karnail Singh Panjoli, member, Shiromani Gurdwara Prabandhak Committee, says that there are several communities within the term ‘Nanakpanthis’ too. “There are groups like Sikhligarh, Vanjaarey, Nirmaley, Lubaney, Johri, Satnamiye, Udaasiyas etc. who call themselves Nanakpanthis. They follow guru Nanak and Sri Guru Granth Sahib.

=== Buddhism ===
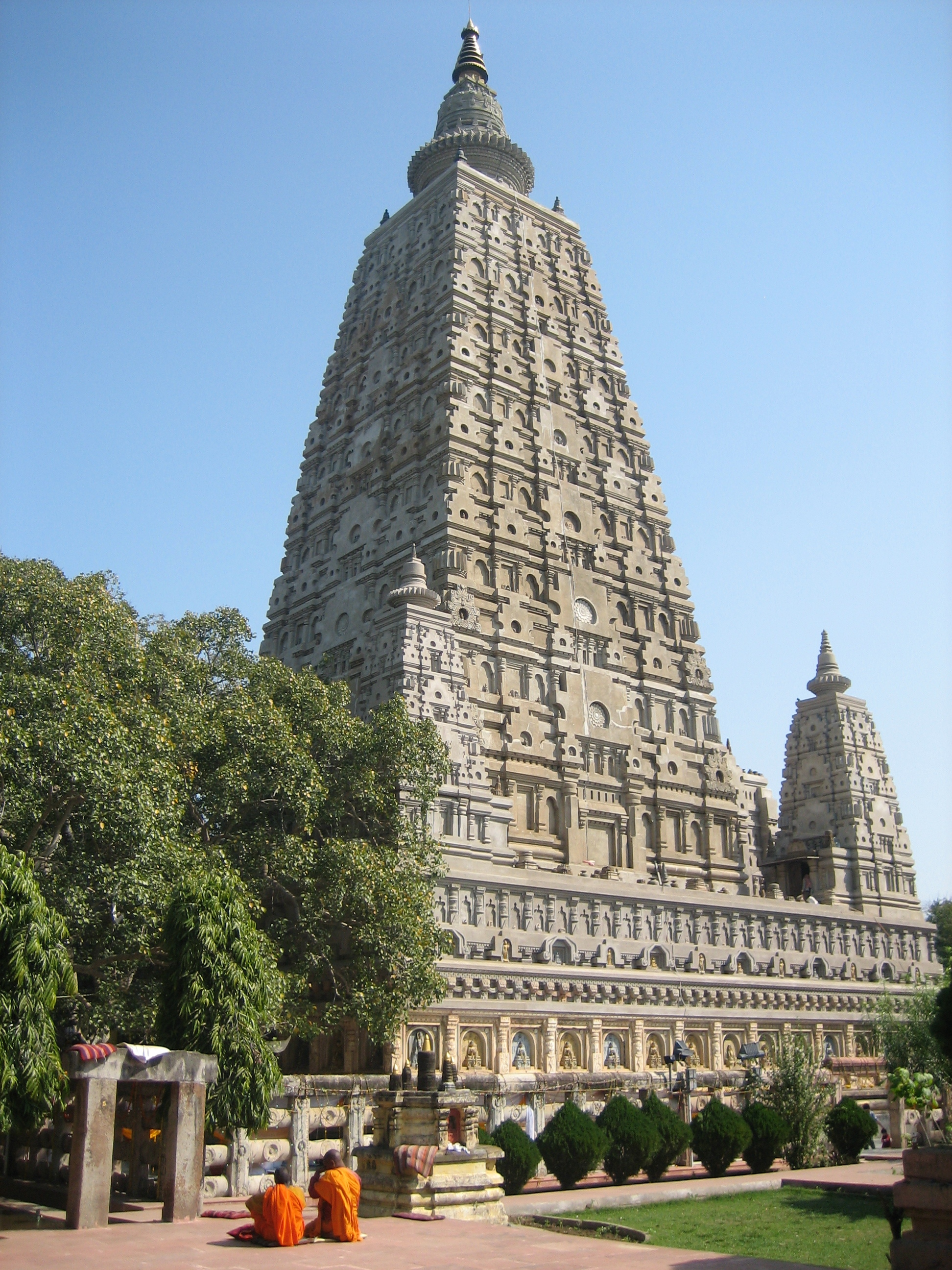
Mahabodhi Temple

Buddhism is an Indian, transtheistic religion and philosophy. Around 8.5 million Buddhists live in India, about 0.7% of the total population. Buddhism as a religion is practised mainly in the foothills of the Himalayas and is a significant religion in Sikkim, Arunachal Pradesh, Ladakh, Darjeeling in West Bengal, and the Lahaul and Spiti districts of Himachal Pradesh. Besides, a significant number of Buddhists reside in Maharashtra. They are the Buddhists or Navayana Buddhists who, under the influence of B. R. Ambedkar embraced Buddhism in order to escape the casteist practices within Hinduism. Ambedkar is a crucial figure, along with Anagarika Dharmapala of Sri Lanka and Kripasaran Mahasthavira of Chittagong behind the revival of Buddhism in India in the 19th and 20th centuries. The escape of the 14th Dalai Lama, Tenzing Gyatso to India fleeing Chinese occupation of Tibet in 1959 and the setting up of the Tibetan Government in Exile at Dharamshala in Mcleodganj in Himachal Pradesh has also accelerated the resurgence of Buddhism in India. The effective religion in Sikkim, which joined the Indian Union in 1975 (making it India's 22nd state) remains Vajrayana Buddhism, and Padmasambhava or Guru Ugyen is a revered presence there.

=== Jainism ===
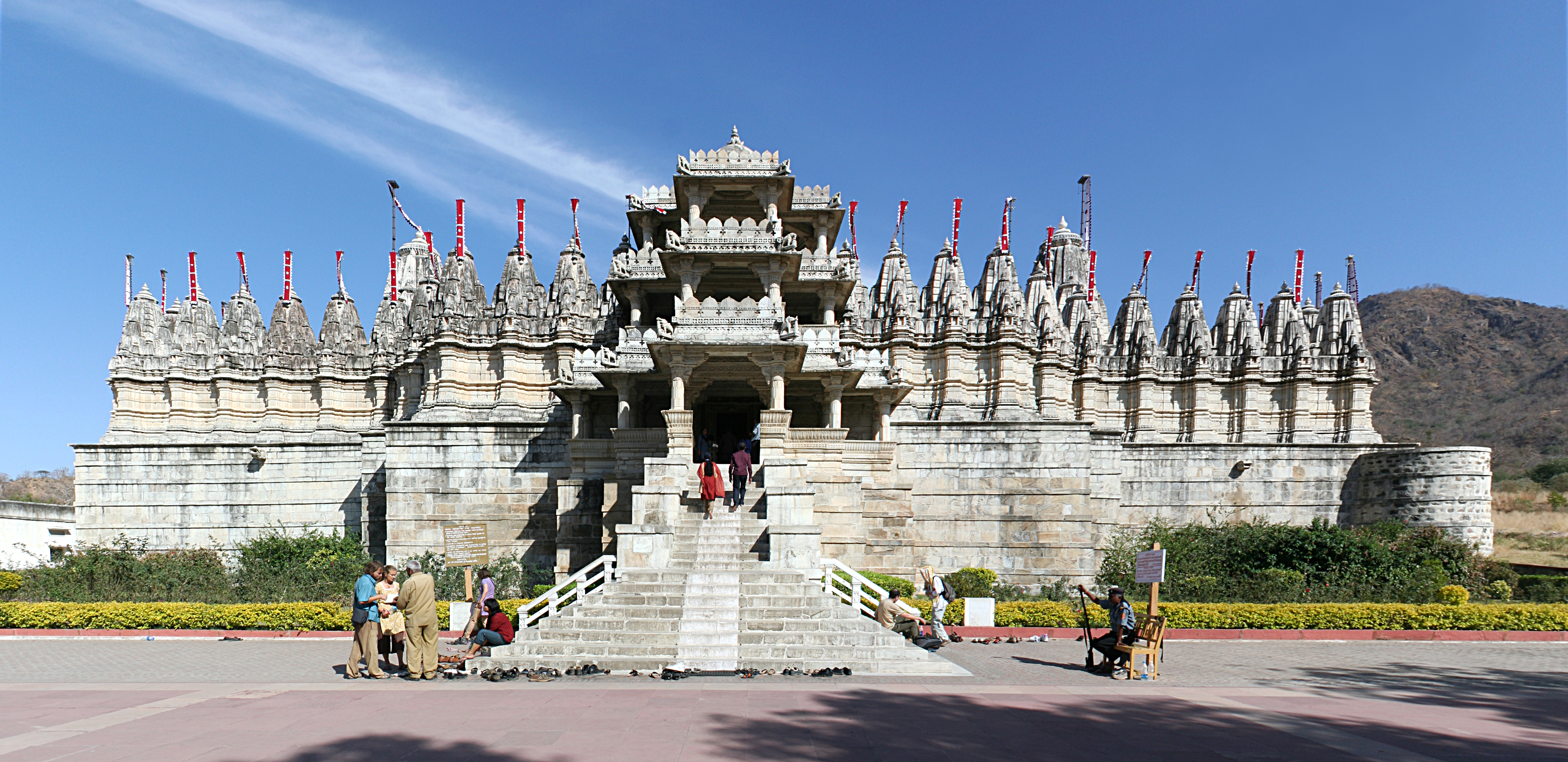
Ranakpur Jain temple

Jainism is a non-theistic Indian religion and philosophical system originating in Iron Age India. Jains compose 0.4% (around 4.45 million) of India's population, and are concentrated in the states of Gujarat, Karnataka, Madhya Pradesh, Maharashtra, and Rajasthan.

=== Judaism ===
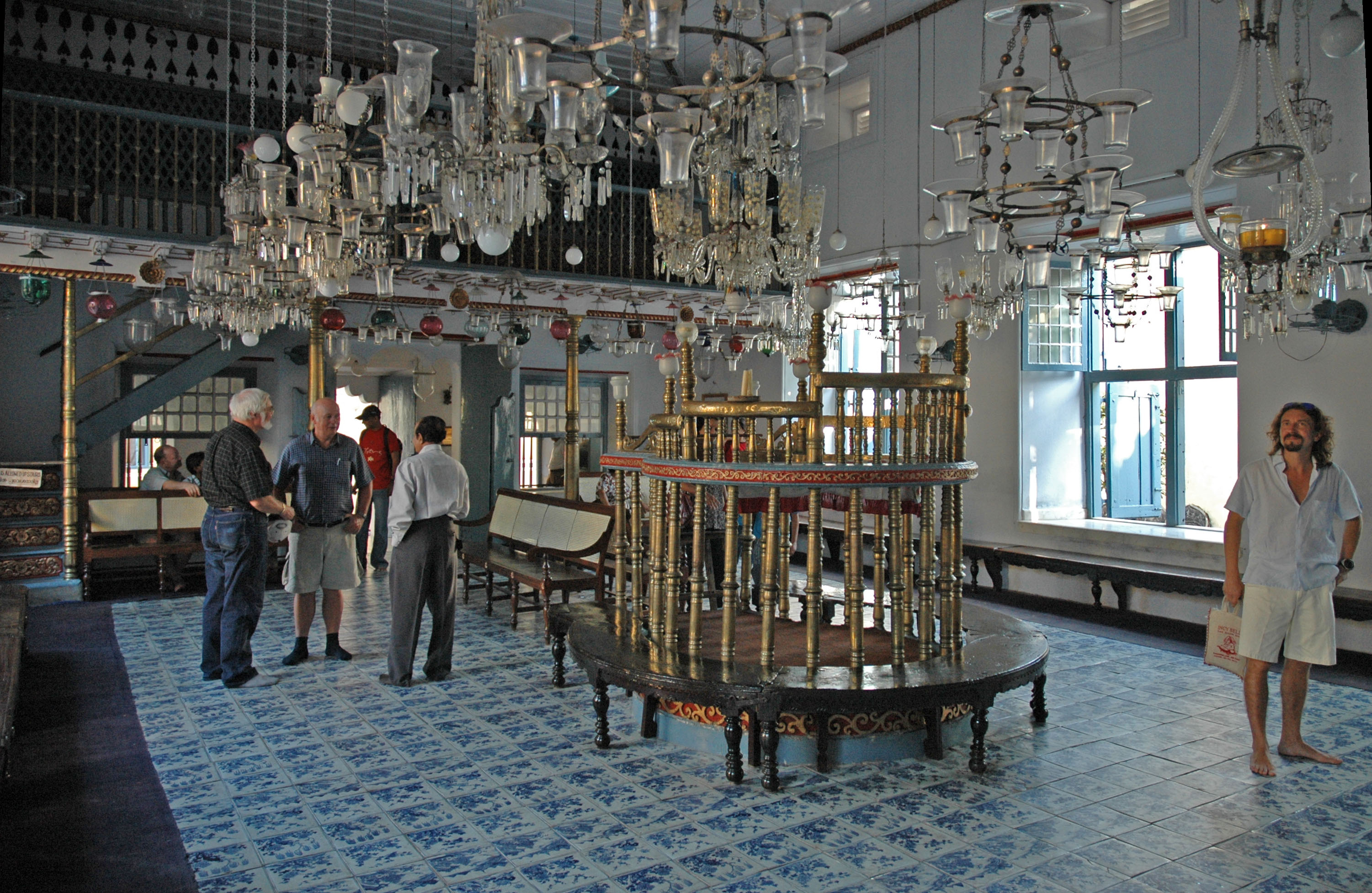
The interior of the Paradesi Synagogue in Cochin

Also present in India, Judaism is a monotheistic religion from the Levant. There is today a very small community of Indian Jews. There were more Jews in India historically, including the Cochin Jews of Kerala, the Bene Israel of Maharashtra, and the Baghdadi Jews near Mumbai. Since Indian independence, two primarily proselyte Indian Jewish communities have developed in India: the Bnei Menashe of Mizoram and Manipur, and the Bene Ephraim, also called Telugu Jews. Of the approximately 95,000 Jews of Indian extraction, fewer than 20,000 remain in India. Some parts of India are especially popular with Israelis, swelling local Jewish populations seasonally.

== Other religions ==
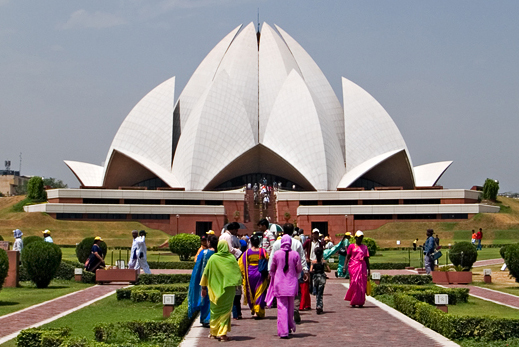
The Baháʼí Faith's Lotus Temple in Delhi, India

As of the census of 2001, Parsis (followers of Zoroastrianism in India) represent approximately 0.006% of the total population of India, with relatively high concentrations in and around the city of Mumbai. Parsis number around 61,000 in India.

There are several tribal religions in India, such as Donyi-Polo. Santhal is also one of the many tribal religions followed by the Santhal people who number around 4 million but only around 23,645 follow the religion. Bathousim is another tribal religion of Boro community of Assam.

It is difficult to establish the exact numbers of Baháʼís in India. The religion came to India from Iran in about 1850 and gained some converts from the Muslim population of India. The first Sikh and Hindu converts came by 1910, and in 1960 there were fewer than 1,000 Baháʼís in all of India. Beginning in 1961, large numbers from scheduled castes became Baháʼís, and by 1993 Baháʼís reported about 2.2 million members, though later sources have claimed 2 million, or "more than 1 million".

Sanamahism is the indigenous religion of Meitei community in Manipur which they follow along with Vaishnavism.

== Irreligion ==
=== Atheism ===
Around 2.9 million people in India did not state their religion in the 2011 census and were counted in the category, "religion not stated". They were 0.24% of India's population. Their number have significantly increased 4 times from 0.7 million in 2001 census at an average annual rate of 15%. K. Veeramani, a Dravidar Kazhagam leader, said that he believed that the number of atheists in India was actually higher as many people don't reveal their atheism out of fear.

According to the 2012 WIN-Gallup Global Index of Religion and Atheism report, 81% of Indians were religious, 13% were non-religious, 3% were convinced atheists, and 3% were unsure or did not respond.

== Legal status and personal law ==
The preamble to the Constitution of India proclaims India a "sovereign socialist secular democratic republic". The word secular was inserted into the Preamble by the Forty-second Amendment Act of 1976. It mandates equal treatment and tolerance of all religions. India does not have an official state religion; it enshrines the right to practice, preach, and propagate any religion. No religious instruction is imparted in government-supported schools. In S. R. Bommai v. Union of India, the Supreme Court of India held that secularism was an integral tenet of the Constitution and that there was separation of state and religion.

Freedom of religion is a fundamental right according to the Indian Constitution. The Constitution also suggests a uniform civil code for its citizens as a Directive Principle. This has not been implemented until now as Directive Principles are Constitutionally unenforceable. The Supreme Court has further held that the enactment of a uniform civil code all at once may be counter-productive to the unity of the nation, and only a gradual progressive change should be brought about (Pannalal Bansilal v State of Andhra Pradesh, 1996). In Maharishi Avadesh v Union of India (1994) the Supreme Court dismissed a petition seeking a writ of mandamus against the government to introduce a common civil code, and thus laid the responsibility of its introduction on the legislature.

Major religious communities not based in India continue to be governed by their own personal laws. While Muslims, Christians, Zoroastrians, and Jews have personal laws exclusive to themselves; Hindus, Jains, Buddhists, and Sikhs are governed by a single personal law known as Hindu personal law. Article 25 (2)(b) of the Constitution of India states that references to Hindus include "persons professing the Sikh, Jain, or Buddhist religion". Furthermore, the Hindu Marriage Act, 1955 defines the legal status of Jains, Buddhists, and Sikhs as legal Hindus but not "Hindus by religion". Supreme Court in 2005 gave verdict that Jains, Sikhs, and Buddhist are part of broader Hindu fold, as they are Indic religions and interconnected to each other, though they are distinct religions.

== Aspects ==
Religion plays a major role in the Indian way of life. Rituals, worship, and other religious activities are very prominent in an individual's daily life; it is also a principal organiser of social life. The degree of religiosity varies among individuals; in recent decades, religious orthodoxy and observances have become less common in Indian society, particularly among young urban-dwellers.

=== Rituals ===
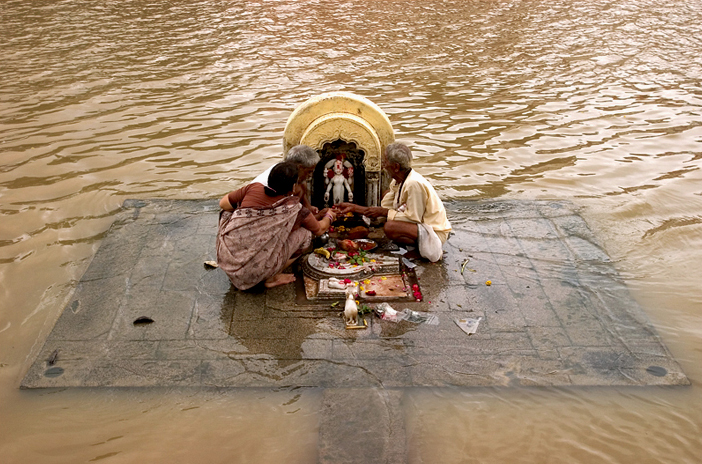
A puja performed on the banks of the overflowing Shipra River in Ujjain during the summer monsoon

The vast majority of Indians engage in religious rituals daily. Most Hindus observe religious rituals at home. Observation of rituals vary greatly among regions, villages, and individuals. Devout Hindus perform daily chores such as worshiping puja, fire sacrifice called Yajna at the dawn after bathing (usually at a family shrine, and typically includes lighting a lamp and offering foods before the images of deities), recitation from religious scripts like Vedas, and Puranas singing hymns in praise of gods.

A notable feature in religious ritual is the division between purity and pollution. Religious acts presuppose some degree of impurity, or defilement for the practitioner, which must be overcome or neutralised, before or during ritual procedures. Purification, usually with water, is thus a typical feature of most religious action. Other characteristics include a belief in the efficacy of sacrifice and concept of merit, gained through the performance of charity or good works, that will accumulate over time and reduce sufferings in the next world.

Muslims offer five daily prayers at specific times of the day, indicated by adhan (call to prayer) from the local mosques. Before offering prayers, they must ritually clean themselves by performing wudu, which involves washing parts of the body that are generally exposed to dirt or dust. A recent study by the Sachar Committee found that 3–4% of Muslim children study in madrasas (Islamic schools).

=== Diet ===
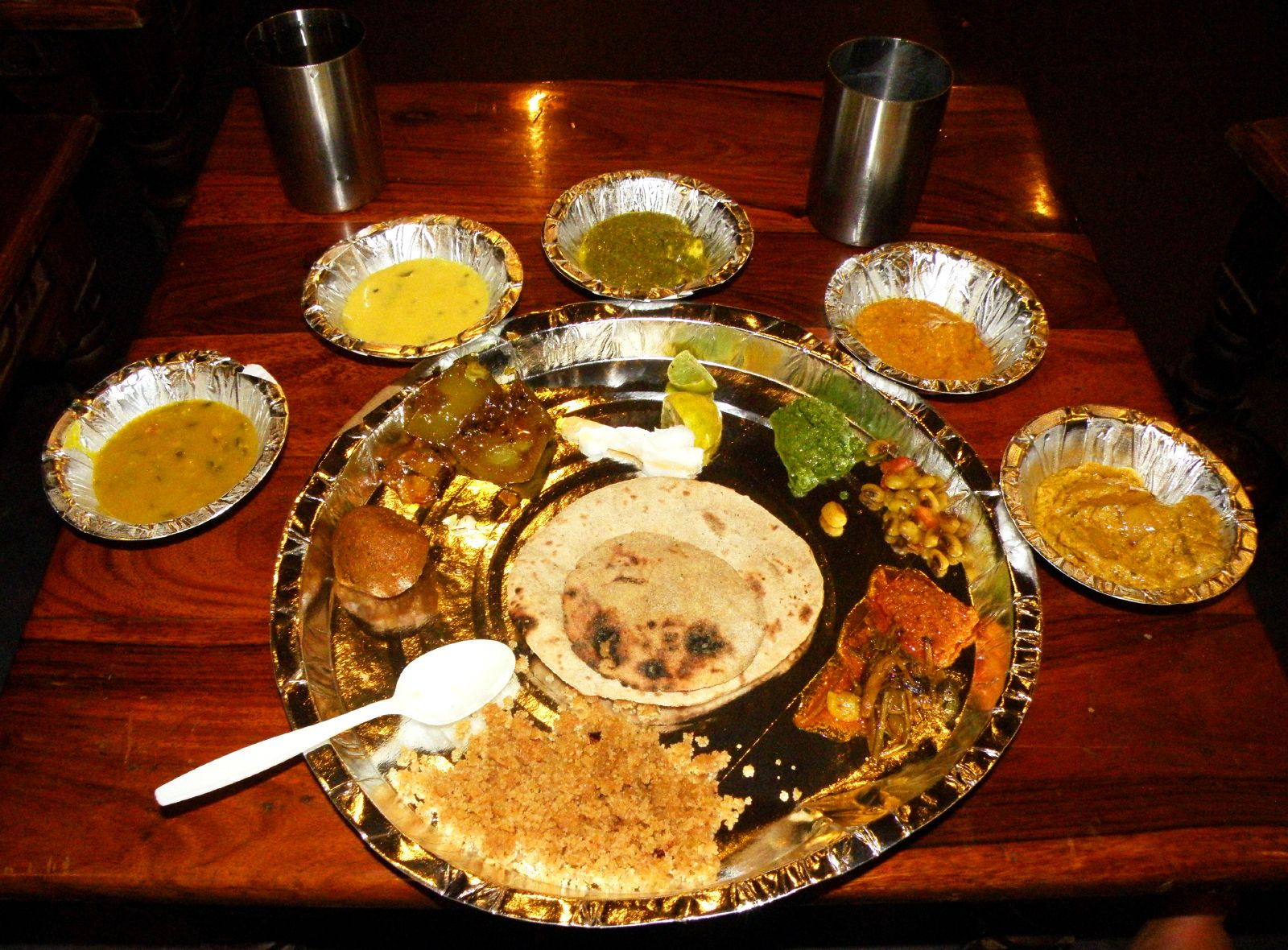
A vegetarian thali from Rajasthan

Dietary habits in India are significantly influenced by religion. According to a survey, 31% of Indian population claims to be vegetarian, and mainly practice lacto-vegetarianism. Vegetarianism is less common among Sikhs, Muslims, Christians, Bahá'ís, Parsis, and Jews. Despite the majority of population having no objection to meat consumption, globally India has the lowest meat consumption per capita. Non-vegetarian Indians mostly prefer poultry, fish, other seafood, goat, and sheep as their sources of meat. Hinduism forbids beef while Islam forbids pork. The smaller populations of Christians, tribals, and some dalit communities have no objection to eating either beef or pork. Jainism requires followers, from all its sects and traditions, to be vegetarian. Furthermore, the religion also forbids Jains from eating any vegetable that involves digging it from the ground. This rule, therefore, excludes all root vegetables such as potatoes, sweet potatoes, ginger, carrots, garlic, radishes, etc. from a Jain diet.

=== Ceremonies ===
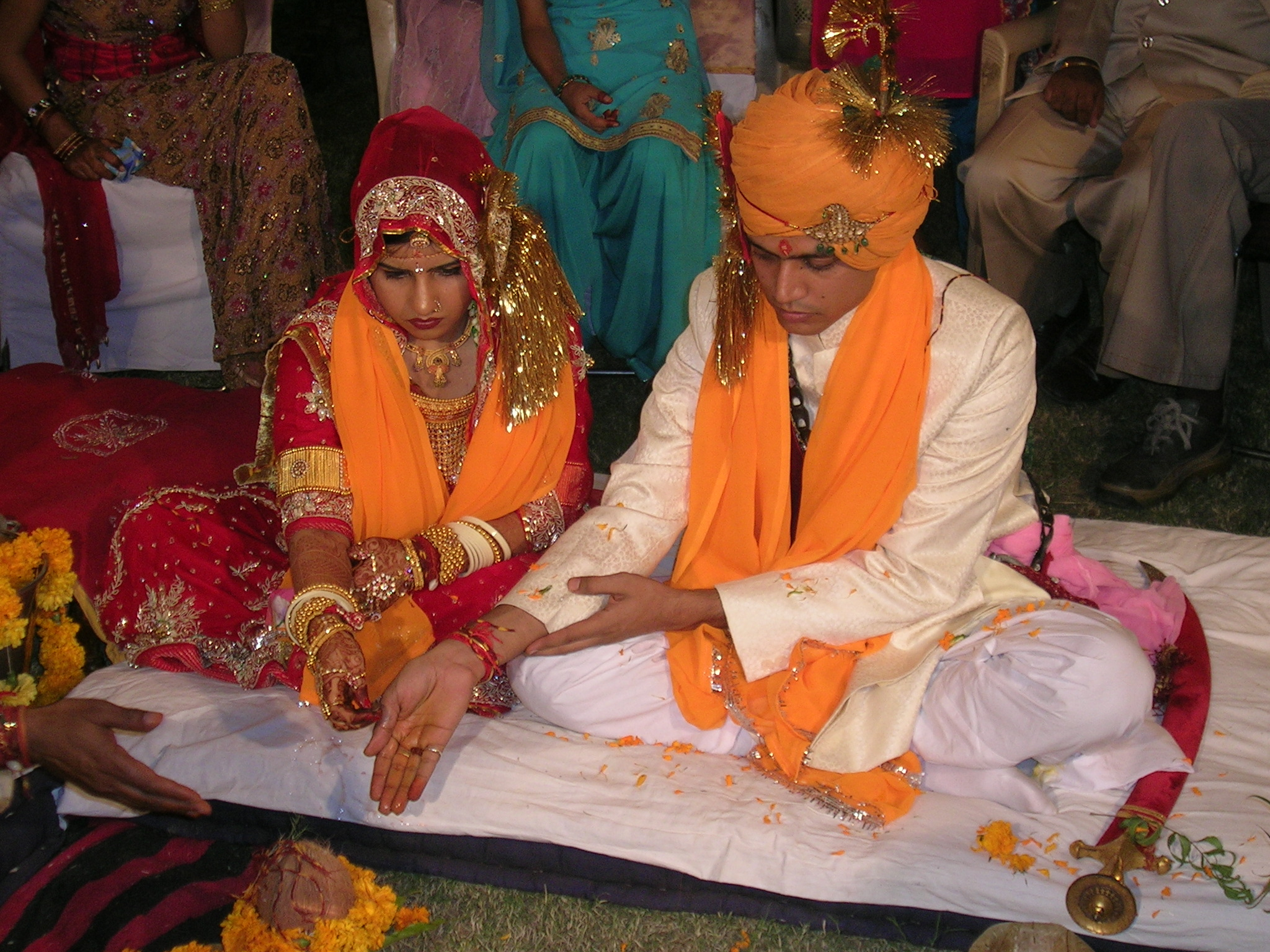
A Hindu wedding ceremony

Occasions like birth, marriage, and death involve what are often elaborate sets of religious customs. In Hinduism, major life-cycle rituals include annaprashan (a baby's first intake of solid food), upanayanam ("sacred thread ceremony" undergone by boys belonging to some upper-castes such as Brahmin and Kshatriya only), and shraadh (paying homage to a deceased individual). According to the findings of a 1995 national research paper, for most people in India, a betrothal of a young couple placing an expectation upon an exact date and time of a future wedding was a matter decided by the parents in consultation with astrologers. A significant reduction in the proportion of arranged marriages has however taken place since 1995, reflecting an incremental change.

Muslims practice a series of life-cycle rituals that differ from those of Hindus, Jains, and Buddhists. Several rituals mark the first days of life—including the whispering call to prayer, first bath, and shaving of the head. Religious instruction begins early. Male circumcision usually takes place after birth; in some families, it may be delayed until after the onset of puberty.

Marriage requires a payment by the husband to the wife, called Meher, and the solemnisation of a marital contract in a social gathering. After the burial of the dead, friends and relatives gather to console the bereaved, read and recite the Quran, and pray for the soul of the deceased. Indian Islam is distinguished by the emphasis it places on shrines commemorating great Sufi saints.

=== Pilgrimages ===
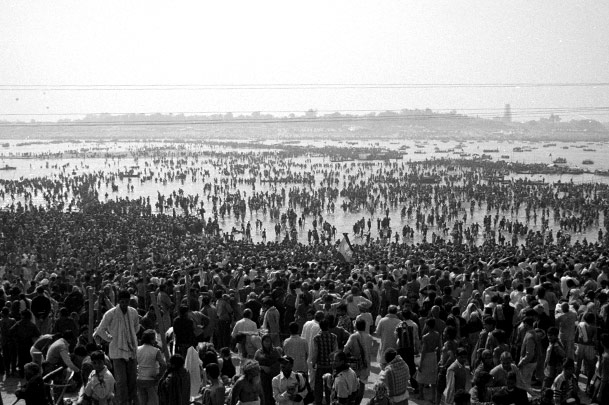
The largest religious gathering ever held on Earth, 2019 Prayag Kumbh Mela held in Allahabad (officially known as Prayagraj) attracted around 120 million people from around the world.

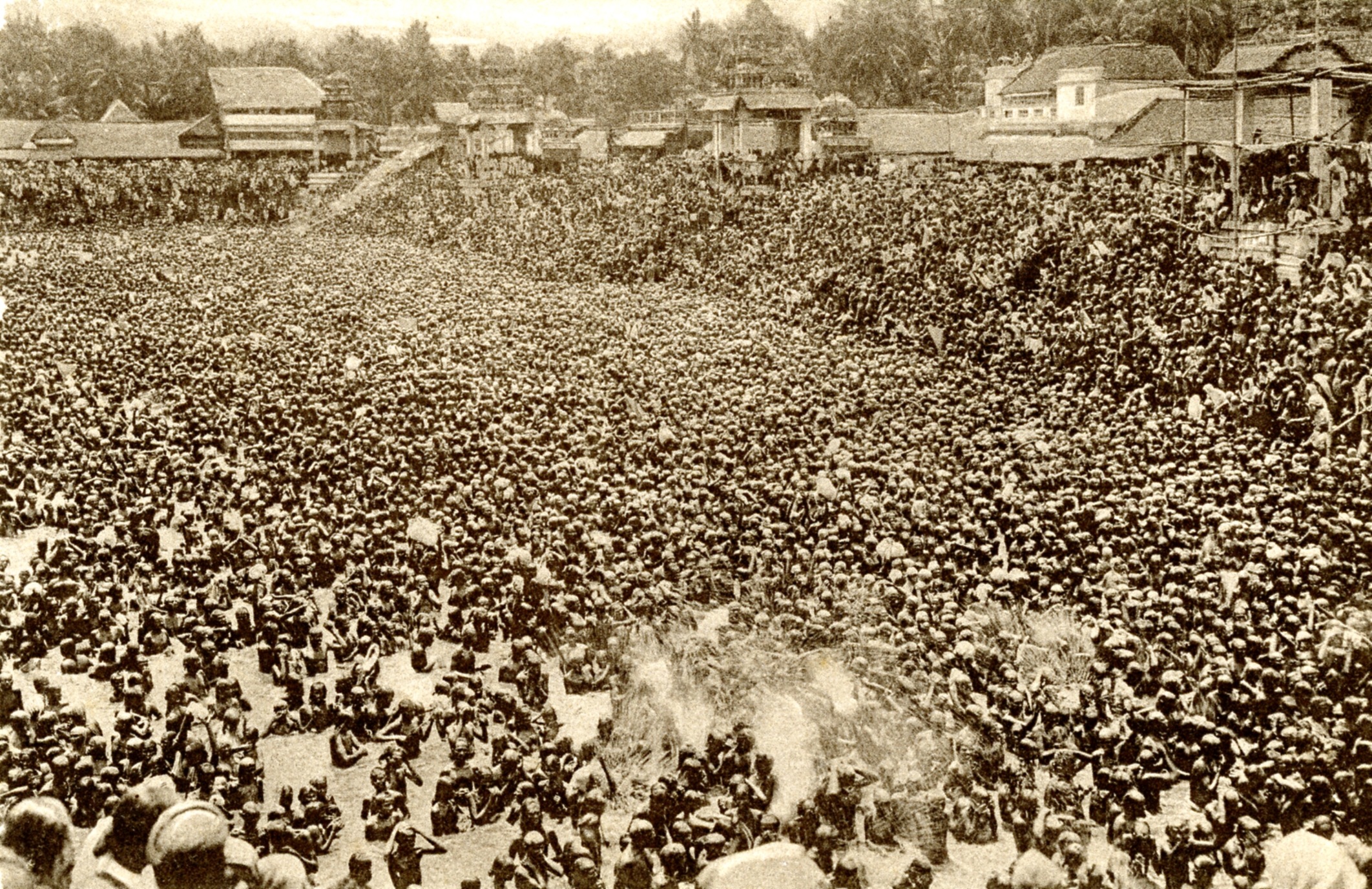
Mahamagam Festival is a holy festival celebrated once in twelve years in Tamil Nadu. Mahamagam Festival, which is held at Kumbakonam. This festival is also called as Kumbamela of South.

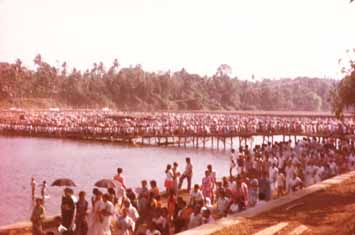
Maramon Convention, the largest annual Christian gathering in Asia, organised by the Mar Thoma Syrian Church

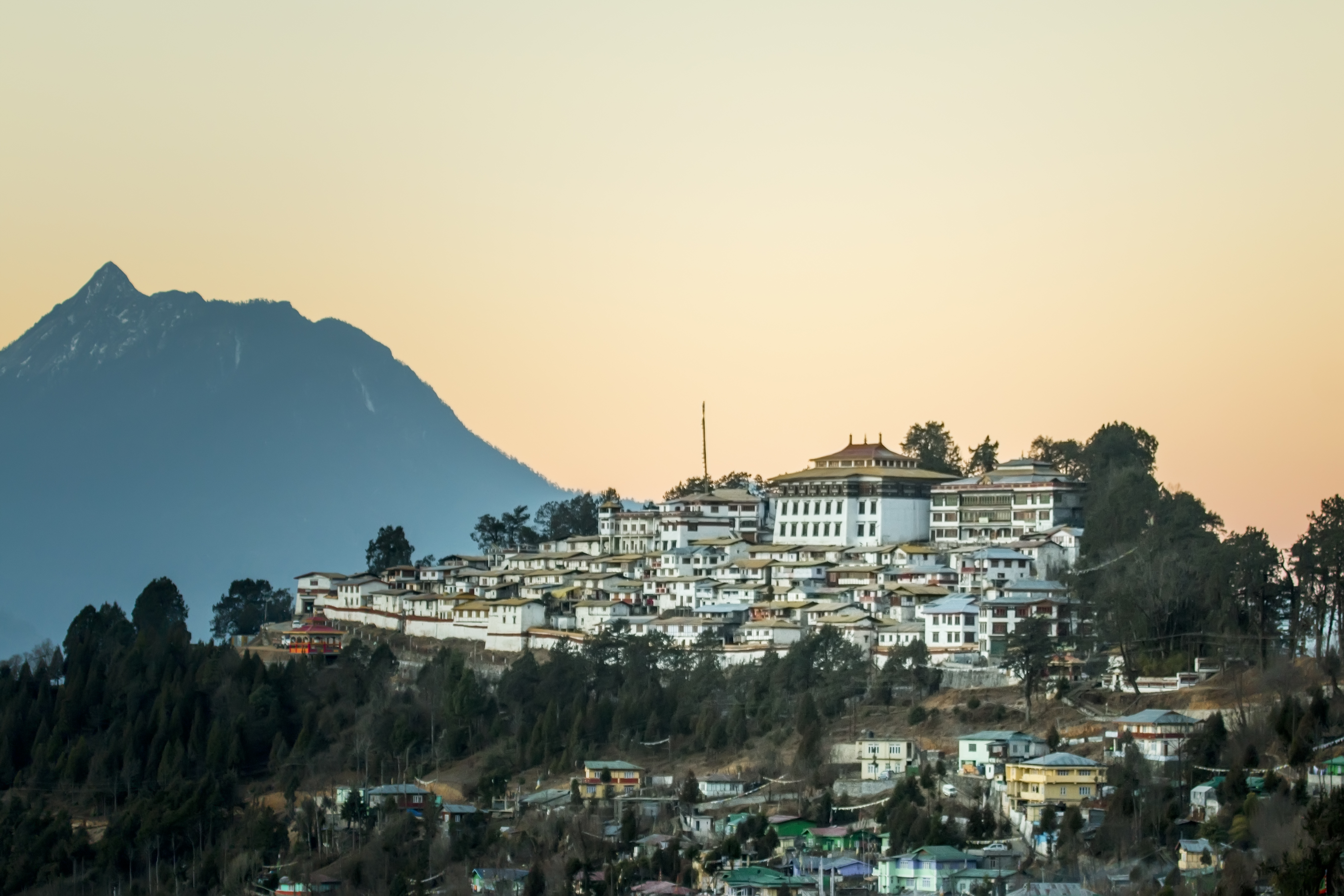
Tawang Monastery in Arunachal Pradesh, was built in the 1600s, is the largest monastery in India and second-largest in the world after the Potala Palace in Lhasa, Tibet.

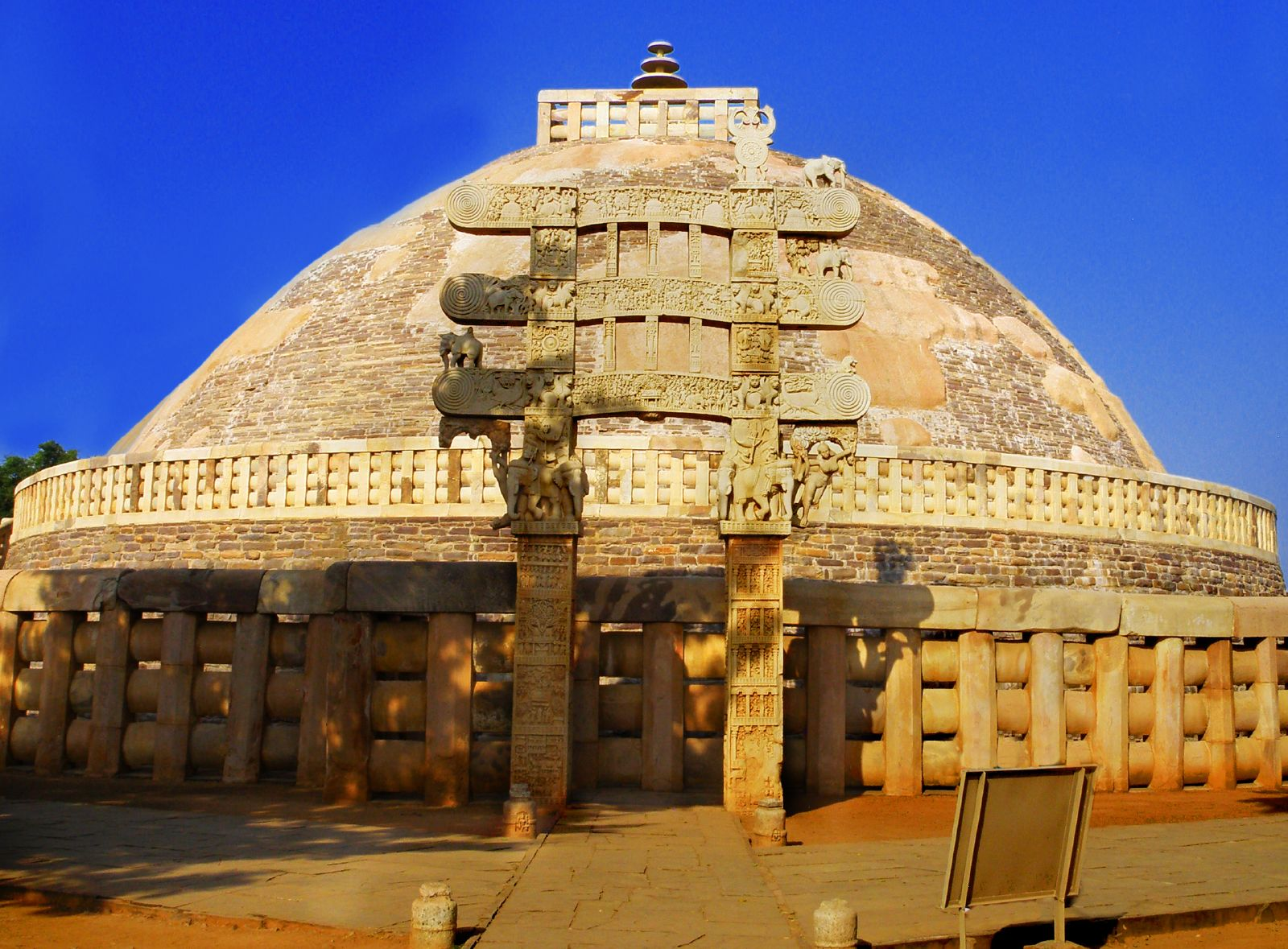
The Sanchi Stupa in Madhya Pradesh is the oldest stone structure in India. Built by Emperor Asoka in the 3rd century BCE, it houses the relics of Buddha Siddhartha Gautama.

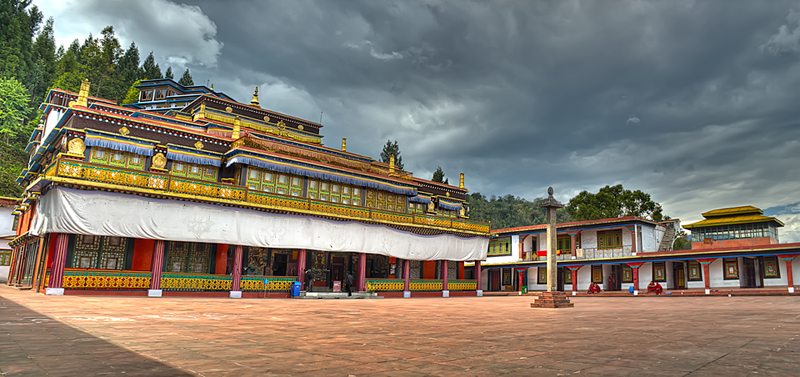
Rumtek Monastery in Sikkim is one of the major tourist attractions of Northeast India.

Many Hindu families have their own family patron deity or the kuladevata. This deity is common to a lineage or a clan of several families who are connected to each other through a common ancestor. The Khandoba of Jejuri is an example of a Kuladevata of some Maharashtrian families; he is a common Kuladevata to several castes ranging from Brahmins to Dalits. The practice of worshipping local or territorial deities as Kuladevata began in the period of the Yadava dynasty. Other family deities of the people of Maharashtra are Bhavani of Tuljapur, Mahalaxmi of Kolhapur, Renuka of Mahur, and Balaji of Tirupati.

India hosts numerous pilgrimage sites belonging to many religions. Hindus worldwide recognise several Indian holy cities, including Allahabad (officially known as Prayagraj), Haridwar, Varanasi, Ujjain, Rameshwaram, and Vrindavan. Notable temple cities include Puri, which hosts a major Jagannath temple and Rath Yatra celebration; Tirumala - Tirupati, home to the Tirumala Venkateswara Temple; and Katra, home to the Vaishno Devi temple.

Badrinath, Puri, Dwarka, and Rameswaram compose the main pilgrimage circuit of Char Dham (four abodes) hosting the four holiest Hindu temples: Badrinath Temple, Jagannath Temple, Dwarkadheesh Temple and Ramanathaswamy Temple, respectively. The Himalayan towns of Badrinath, Kedarnath, Gangotri, and Yamunotri compose the smaller Chota Char Dham (mini four abodes) pilgrimage circuit. The Kumbh Mela (the "pitcher festival") is one of the holiest of Hindu pilgrimages that is held every four years; the location is rotated among Allahabad (Prayagraj), Haridwar, Nashik, and Ujjain. The Thalaimaippathi at Swamithope is the leading pilgrim center for the Ayyavazhis.

Seven of the Eight Great Places of Buddhism are in India. Bodh Gaya, Sarnath, and Kushinagar are the places where important events in the life of Gautama Buddha took place. Sanchi hosts a Buddhist stupa erected by the emperor Ashoka. Many Buddhist monasteries dot the Himalayan foothills of India, where Buddhism remains a major presence. These include the Rumtek Monastery, Enchey Monastery, and Pemayangtse Monastery in Sikkim, the Tawang Monastery in Arunachal Pradesh, the Kye Monastery and Tabo Monastery in Spiti, the Ghum Monastery in Darjeeling, and Durpin Dara Monastery in Kalimpong, the Thikse Monastery in Leh, the Namgyal Monastery in Dharamshala, among many others.

For Sunni Muslims, the Dargah Shareef of Khwaza Moinuddin Chishti in Ajmer is a major pilgrimage site. Other Islamic pilgrimages include those to the Tomb of Sheikh Salim Chishti in Fatehpur Sikri, Jama Masjid in Delhi, and to Haji Ali Dargah in Mumbai. Dilwara Temples in Mount Abu, Palitana, Pavapuri, Girnar, and Shravanabelagola are notable pilgrimage sites (tirtha) in Jainism.

The Harmandir Sahib in Amritsar is the most sacred gurdwara of Sikhism.

Relatively new pilgrimage sites include the samadhi of Meher Baba in Meherabad, which is visited by his followers from around the world and the Saibaba temple in Shirdi.

=== Minority beliefs and sects ===
Hinduism contains many different sub-cultures just like most other religions. The major aspects outlined above hold true for the majority of the Hindu population, but not all. Just as each state is home to an individual language, Hinduism harbours various sub-cultures whose traditions may or may not be shared by other Indians. A sect from Gujarat called the Prajapatis for example, holds water as the sacred ornament to every meal. Before and after a meal, an individual is expected to pour water in the palms of their right hand and sip the water three times. This is often seen as a purification gesture: food is regarded as being holy and every individual must purify themselves before touching their food.

Other minor sects in India carry no specific name, but they are uniquely identified by the last names of each family. This convention is used more frequently in South India than in North India. For example, a relatively prominent sect in southern India prohibits making important decisions, commencing new tasks, and doing other intellectually or spiritually engaged actions after sunset. Historians believe that this tradition was derived from the concept of Rahukaalam, in which Hindus believe that a specific period of the day is inauspicious. Stringent family beliefs are thought to have led to the development of a more constrained religious hierarchy. Over time, this belief was extended to discourage taking major actions and even staying awake for long periods after sunset. Examples of families which follow this tradition include Gudivada, Padalapalli, Pantham, and Kashyap.

== Religiosity ==
Religiosity among Indians (2012 Survey)
1. Religious (81%)
2. Atheists (3%)
3. No religion (13%)
4. Not stated (3%)

India has a population of 123 crore (1,230,000,000) per a 2012 demographic survey by Indian government.

Cambridge University Press in a 2004 demographic study found that there are 102.87 million atheists and agnostics living in India, thus constituting 9.1% of the total population, out of total 1.1296 billion people respectively. According to the 2012 WIN-Gallup Global Index of Religion and Atheism report, 81% of Indians were religious, 13% were non-religious, 3% were convinced atheists, and 3% were unsure or did not respond.

=== By age ===
Survey evidence indicates that younger Indians display lower levels of religiosity than older youth cohorts. According to the CSDS–Lokniti Youth Survey (2017), 40% of youth overall fall into the category of low, very low, or no religiosity. Among the youngest respondents (ages 15–17 and 18–21), this proportion rises to 44%, suggesting that non-religiosity is more prevalent at younger ages. As age increases, the share of respondents reporting low or no religiosity declines gradually, falling to 37% among those aged 26–29 and 35% among those aged 30–34.

=== By religion ===
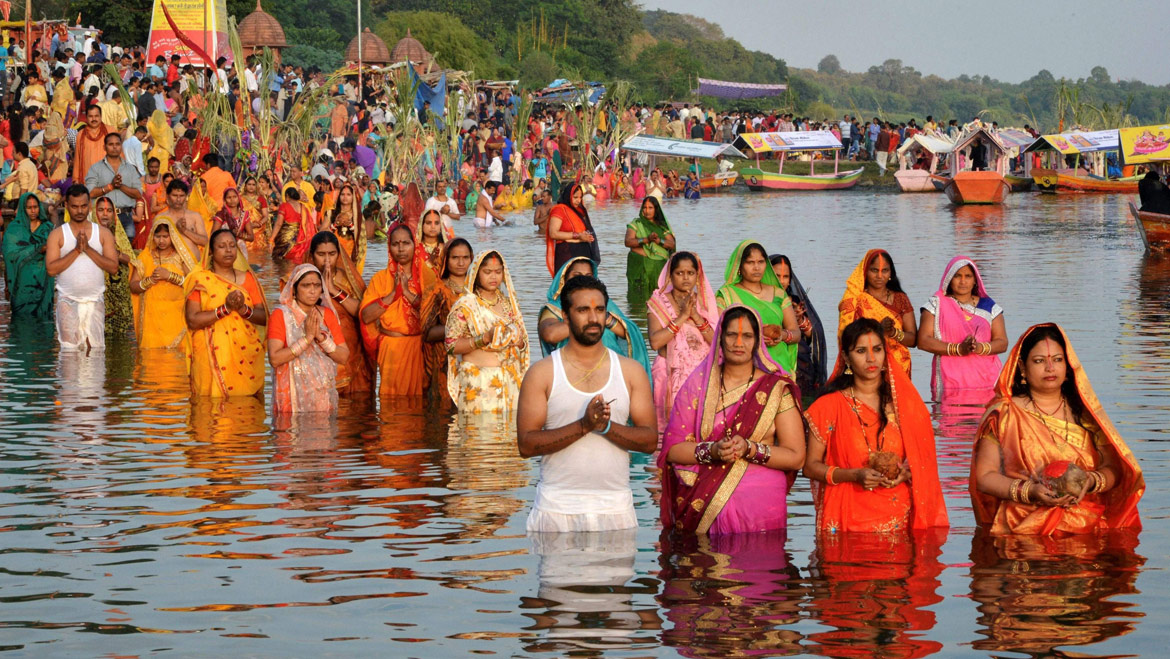
Hindu devotees performing puja to the sun god Surya during Chhath Puja

The CSDS–Lokniti Youth Survey (2017) also reveals substantial variation in religiosity across religious communities. Among Indian Muslims, 38% of youth report high or very high religiosity, while only 29% report low or no religiosity. Christian youth similarly show relatively high religious commitment, with 47% reporting high religiosity and 36% reporting low or no religiosity. Sikh youth display a more balanced distribution, with 36% reporting high religiosity and 40% reporting low or no religiosity. Within Hindu youth, the data indicate significant internal diversity. Hindu upper-caste youth report the highest levels of religiosity within the Hindu population (41% high religiosity), while Hindu OBC youth report 35%, Hindu Scheduled Caste youth 32%, and Hindu Scheduled Tribe youth 29%. Correspondingly, the proportion reporting low or no religiosity increases from 37% among Hindu upper castes to 47% among Hindu Scheduled Tribes, highlighting variation in religious intensity across caste groups within Hinduism.

== Religion and politics ==
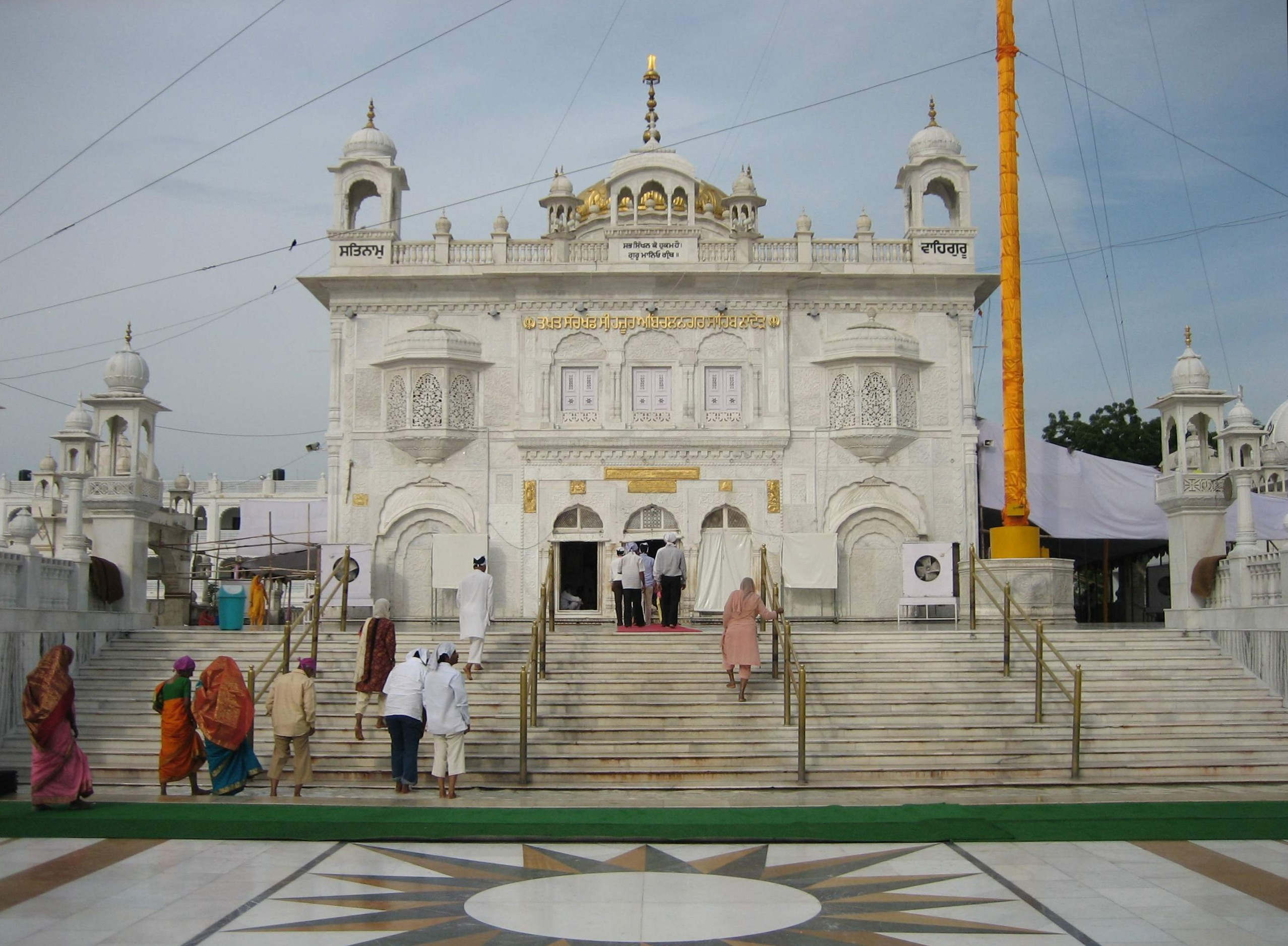
Takht Sri Hazur Sahib in Nanded was built over the place where Guru Gobind Singh Ji was cremated in 1708; the inner chamber is still called Angitha Sahib.

=== Politics ===
Religious politics, particularly that expressed by the Hindutva movement, has strongly influenced Indian politics in the last quarter of the 20th century. Many of the elements underlying India's casteism and communalism originated during the colonial era, when the colonial government frequently politicised religion in an attempt to stave off increasing nationalistic sentiments in India. The Indian Councils Act 1909 (widely known as the Morley-Minto Reforms Act), which established separate Hindu and Muslim electorates for the Imperial Legislature and provincial councils, was particularly divisive, increasing tensions between the two communities.

Due to the high degree of oppression faced by the lower castes, the Constitution of India included provisions for affirmative action for certain sections of Indian society. Many states ruled by the Bharatiya Janata Party (BJP) introduced laws that made conversion more difficult; they assert that such conversions are often forced or allured. The BJP, a national political party, also gained widespread media attention after its leaders associated themselves with the Ram Janmabhoomi movement and other prominent religious issues.

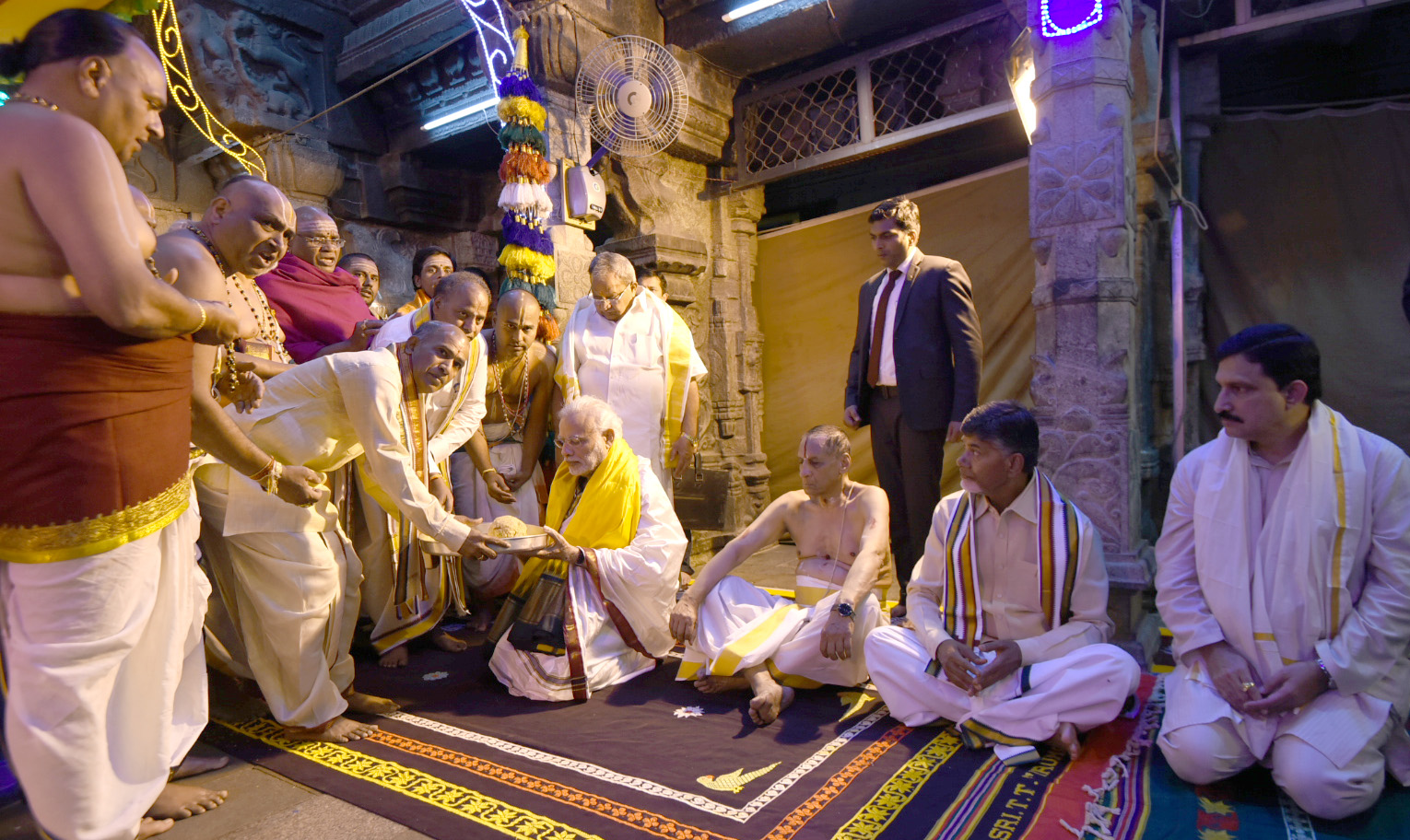
Indian Prime Minister Narendra Modi pays obeisance at Tirumala Temple in Andhra Pradesh

A well-known accusation that Indian political parties make for their rivals is that they play vote bank politics, meaning give political support to issues for the sole purpose of gaining the votes of members of a particular community. Both the Congress Party and the BJP have been accused of exploiting the people by indulging in vote bank politics. The Shah Bano case, a divorce lawsuit, generated much controversy when the Congress was accused of appeasing the Muslim orthodoxy by bringing in a parliamentary amendment to negate the Supreme Court's decision. After the 2002 Gujarat violence, there were allegations of political parties indulging in vote bank politics. All the political parties in India are known to grant money to the State Waqf Boards to appease a particular community.

Caste-based politics is also important in India; caste-based discrimination and the reservation system continue to be major issues that are hotly debated.

=== Communalism ===
Communalism has played a key role in shaping the religious history of modern India. After Indian independence in 1947, India was partitioned along religious lines into two states—the Muslim-majority Dominion of Pakistan (comprising what is now the Islamic Republic of Pakistan and the People's Republic of Bangladesh) and the Hindu-majority Union of India (later the Republic of India). The partition led to rioting among Hindus, Muslims, and Sikhs in Punjab, Bengal, Delhi, and other parts of India; 500,000 died as a result of the violence. The twelve million refugees that moved between the newly founded nations of India and Pakistan composed one of the largest mass migrations in modern history. Since its independence, India has periodically witnessed large-scale violence sparked by underlying tensions between sections of its majority Hindu and minority Muslim communities. The Republic of India is secular; the Indian government recognises no official religion.

=== Communal conflicts ===
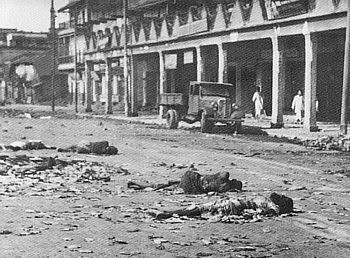
Aftermath of Hindu-Muslim clashes in Calcutta, following the 1946 Direct Action Day, which was announced by the All India Muslim League to show the strength of Muslim feelings towards its demand for an "autonomous and sovereign" Muslim state called Pakistan.

Communal conflicts have periodically plagued India since it became independent in 1947. The roots of such strife lie largely in the underlying tensions between sections of its majority Hindu and minority Muslim communities, which emerged under the Raj and during the bloody Partition of India. Such conflict also stems from the competing ideologies of Hindu nationalism versus Islamic fundamentalism; both are prevalent in parts of the Hindu and Muslim populations. This issue has plagued India since before independence. The lack of education among the masses and the ease with which corrupt politicians can take advantage of the same has been attributed as the major reason for religious conflicts in India. Even though Freedom of religion is an integral part of the India constitution, the inability to hold a communal mob accountable for its collective actions has limited the exercise of religious freedom in India.

Alongside other major Indian independence leaders, Mahatma Gandhi and his Shanti sainiks ("peace soldiers") worked to quell early outbreaks of religious conflict in Bengal, including riots in Calcutta (now in West Bengal) and Noakhali District (in modern-day Bangladesh) that accompanied Muhammad Ali Jinnah's Direct Action Day, which was launched on 16 August 1946. These conflicts, waged largely with rocks and knives and accompanied by widespread looting and arson, were crude affairs. Explosives and firearms, which are rarely found in India, were far less likely to be used.

Major post-independence communal conflicts include the 1984 Anti-Sikh riots, which followed Operation Blue Star by the Indian Army; heavy artillery, tanks, and helicopters were employed against the Sikh partisans inside the Harmandir Sahib, causing heavy damage to Sikhism's holiest Gurdwara. According to the Indian government estimates, the assault caused the deaths of up to 100 soldiers, 250 militants, and hundreds of civilians.

This triggered Indira Gandhi's assassination by her outraged Sikh bodyguards on 31 October 1984, which set off a four-day period during which Sikhs were massacred; The Government of India reported 2,700 Sikh deaths however human rights organisations and newspapers report the death toll to be 10,000–17,000. In the aftermath of the riot, the Government of India reported 20,000 had fled the city, however the PUCL reported "at least" 50,000 displaced persons.

The most affected regions were neighbourhoods in Delhi. Human rights organisations and the newspapers believe the massacre was organised. The collusion of political officials in the massacres and the failure to prosecute any killers alienated normal Sikhs and increased support for the Khalistan movement. The Akal Takht, the governing religious body of Sikhism, considers the killings to be a genocide.

Other incidents include the 1992 Bombay riots that followed the demolition of the Babri Mosque as a result of the Ayodhya debate, and the 2002 Gujarat violence where 790 Muslims and 254 Hindus were killed and which was preceded by the Godhra Train Burning. Lesser incidents plague many towns and villages; the representative was the killing of five people in Mau, Uttar Pradesh, during Hindu–Muslim rioting, which was triggered by the proposed celebration of a Hindu festival.

== See also ==
- Dalit Buddhist movement
- List of Hindu festivals
- Religion in Kerala
- Religious violence in India
- Violence against Muslims in independent India

== Notes ==
=== Footnotes ===
- α: The data exclude the Mao-Maram, Paomata, and Purul subdivisions of Manipur's Senapati district.
- β: The data are "unadjusted" (without excluding Assam and Jammu and Kashmir); the 1981 census was not conducted in Assam and the 1991 census was not conducted in Jammu and Kashmir.
- γ: Oberlies (1998, p. 155) gives an estimate of 1100 BCE for the youngest hymns in book ten. Estimates for a terminus post quem of the earliest hymns are far more uncertain. Oberlies (p. 158), based on "cumulative evidence", sets a wide range of 1700–1100 BCE. The EIEC (s.v. Indo-Iranian languages, p. 306) gives a range of 1500–1000 BCE. The hymns certainly post-date Indo-Iranian separation of ca. 2000 BCE. It cannot be ruled out that archaic elements of the Rigveda go back to only a few generations after this time, but philological estimates tend to date the bulk of the text to the latter half of the second millennium.
- Δ: According to the most conservative estimates given by Symonds (1950, p. 74), half a million people perished and twelve million became homeless.
- ε: Statistic describes resident Indian nationals up to six years in age.
