= Judicial review in India =

Power of Supreme and High Courts of India

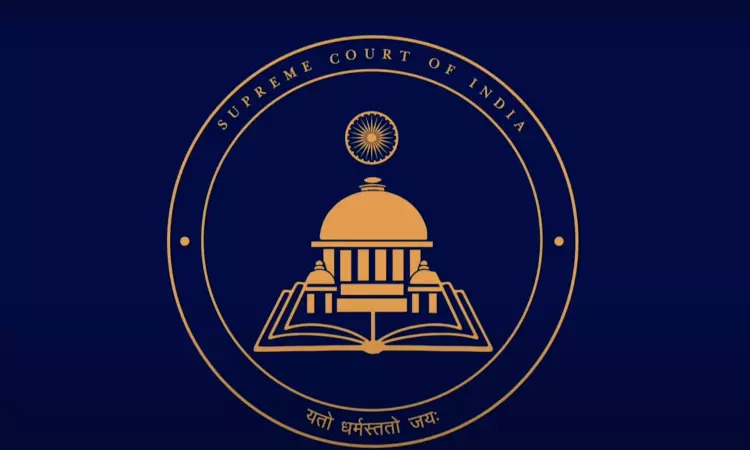
Emblem of Supreme Court of India

Judicial review in India is a process by which the Supreme Court and the High Courts of India examine, determine and invalidate the Executive or Legislative actions inconsistent with the Constitution of India. The Constitution of India explicitly provides for judicial review through Articles 13, 32, 131 through 136, 143, 226 and 246.

Judicial review is one of the checks and balances in the separation of powers, the power of the judiciary to supervise the legislative and executive branches and ensure constitutional supremacy. The Supreme Court and the High Courts have the power to invalidate any law, ordinance, order, bye-law, rule, regulation, notification, custom or usage that has the force of law and is incompatible with the terms of the Constitution of India. Since Kesavananda Bharati v. State of Kerala (1970), the courts can invalidate any constitutional amendments if they infringe on the Basic Structure of the Constitution of India.

Frequently, judicial review is used to protect and enforce the Fundamental Rights guaranteed in the Constitution. To a lesser extent, judicial review is used in matters concerning legislative competence concerning the centre-state relations.

== History ==
=== Constituent Assembly ===
==== Article 13 ====
Article 13 deals with the Laws inconsistent with the Fundamental Rights. The Constituent Assembly debated the Draft Article on the 25th, 26 and 29 November 1948 and adopted the amended Draft Article on 29 November 1948.

The executive and legislative bodies cannot take any actions that infringe on the Rights conferred by Part 3 of the Constitution. If they do, the Courts can void part of the legislative or executive action that infringes on the Rights.

==== Article 32 ====
Article 32 guarantees the right to approach the Supreme Court for Constitutional Remedies when their Fundamental Rights are violated. The Constituent Assembly debated and adopted the Draft Article with some amendments on 9 December 1948.

The Constituent Assembly was unanimous about the importance of the Article. Gammiḍidala Durgabai, the only woman in the Committee on the Rules of Procedure, said

This is a right which is fundamental to all the fundamental rights guaranteed under this Constitution.

Madabhushi Ananthasayanam Ayyangar, Member of the Advisory Committee on Fundamental Rights, Minorities and Tribal and Excluded Areas, said

The Supreme Court according to me is the Supreme guardian of the citizen's rights in any democracy. I would even go further and say that it is the soul of democracy. The executive which comes into being for the time being is apt to abuse its powers, and therefore the Supreme Court must be there, strong and un-trammelled by the day to day passions.

B. R. Ambedkar, Chairman of the Drafting Committee, noting the majority of those who spoke on this article have realised the importance and significance, said,

If I was asked to name any particular article in this Constitution as the most important—an article without which this Constitution would be a nullity—I could not refer to any other article except this one. It is the very soul of the Constitution and the very heart of it and I am glad that the House has realised its importance.

While the members have recognised the importance of Constitutional Remedies, B. R. Ambedkar noted that despite the discussions on writs, members have not realised the importance of including the writs in this Article. After the adoption of the Constitution, a simple majority would not be able to take away the power to issue writs.

==== Article 141 ====
Article 141 stated that the decisions of the Supreme Court were binding on all other courts in India. The Constituent Assembly debated and adopted the Draft Article on 27 May 1949.

During the debate, B. R. Ambedkar clarified that though the Article reads all courts in India, it does not include the Supreme Court. The Supreme Court would be free to change its decision and take a different view from the one it had taken before. Following the clarification, the Draft Article was adopted without any amendment.

==== Article 142 ====
Article 142 stated that any decree or order passed by the Supreme Court to do complete justice was enforceable throughout the territory of India. The Constituent Assembly adopted the Draft Article on 27 May 1949.

=== Parliamentary Supremacy ===
The Parliament enacted the First Amendment to the Constitution on 18 June 1951, adding the Ninth Schedule to Constitution to protect specific laws from judicial review. When the constitutionality of the amendment was challenged, a five-judge bench of the Supreme Court held that Article 368 grants the Parliament the power to amend the Constitution, including the Fundamental Rights and Article 368 in Shankari Prasad Singh Deo v. Union of India (1951) and Sajjan Singh v. State of Rajasthan (1965). The Bench held that the term law in Article 13(2) does not include the Constitutional Amendments.

=== Judicial Supremacy ===
An eleven-judge bench of the Supreme Court overruled the previous ruling on judicial review of the Constitutional Amendments in Golaknath v. State Of Punjab (1967). Since the amendment of the Constitution is a legislative process, an amendment under Article 368 is law within the meaning of Article 13 of the Constitution. Therefore, an amendment that "takes away or abridges" a Fundamental Right is void.

=== Basic Structure Doctrine ===
In response to the Golaknath v. State Of Punjab (1967) ruling, the Parliament passed amendments restricting the power of judicial review. The Twenty-fourth Amendment excluded the Constitutional Amendment passed under Article 368 from the term law in Article 13(2). As a result, the Courts cannot invalidate the Constitutional Amendment for infringing the Fundamental Rights. Twenty-fifth Amendment added Article 31C that the Supreme Court cannot invalidate any law related to Directive Principles in Article 39 (b) and (c) for infringing the Fundamental Rights.

When the Twenty-fourth, Twenty-fifth and Twenty-ninth Constitutional Amendments were challenged, a thirteen-judge Bench of the Supreme Court overruled the Golaknath v. State Of Punjab (1967) in the verdict of Kesavananda Bharati v. State of Kerala (1973). The Bench held that Article 368 contained both power and procedure to amend the Constitution, and the term law in Article 13(2) does not include Constitutional Amendments but Article 368 does not empower the Parliament to alter the Basic Structure of the Constitution, thus establishing the Basic Structure Doctrine. The Bench upheld the Twenty-fourth and Twenty-ninth Constitutional Amendments. However, it struck down the third clause in the Twenty-fifth Amendment that restricted the power of judicial review of laws for infringing Fundamental Rights. The Bench held that the separation of powers is an element of the Constitution protected by the Basic Structure Doctrine, where judicial review is one of the checks and balances in the separation of powers. A five-judge Bench of the Supreme Court affirmed and further clarified the Basic Structure Doctrine in Indira Nehru Gandhi v. Raj Narain (1975). The Bench identified the rule of law, which relies on effective judicial review, as an element of the basic structure of the Constitution.

=== Constitutional Supremacy ===
In response to the Kesavananda Bharati v. State of Kerala (1973), the Parliament passed the Forty-second Amendment to A five-judge Bench of the Supreme Court applied and clarified the Basic Structure Doctrine in Minerva Mills v. Union of India (1977). The Bench struck down sections of the Amendment that removed the power of the Courts to review the Constitutional Amendments and accorded precedence to the Directive Principles of State Policy over Fundamental Rights. The Bench clarified that the Constitution grants the Parliament the power to amend, not destroy. While ruling this case, the Bench explicitly held that judicial Review is an element of the Constitution protected by the Basic Structure Doctrine.

A five-judge Bench of the Supreme Court held that the laws under the Ninth Schedule, before the Kesavananda Bharati v. State of Kerala (1973) case, cannot be challenged in the Court for violating Fundamental Rights in Waman Rao v. Union of India (1981). In doing so, the Bench established the Doctrine of Prospective Overruling, which dictates that a decision in a particular case would have an operation in the future and will not carry any retrospective effect on the past judgments. Later, a nine-judge Bench of the Supreme Court clarified that any law placed in the Ninth Schedule after the Kesavananda Bharati v. State of Kerala (1973) case is subject to judicial review on infringement of the Fundamental Rights in IR Coelho v. State of Tamil Nadu (2007).

When the constitutionality of the Tenth Schedule was challenged in Kihoto Hollohan v Zachillhu (1992), a five-judge Bench of the Supreme Court upheld the power of the Speaker to decide on questions of disqualification but voided the provision excluding the decision from judicial review. The Bench noted that the power of the Speaker is judicial power, which is required to adhere to the rule of law and cannot be outside the purview of judicial review. The Bench limited the scope of judicial review to claims of bias and other principles of natural justice.

While dealing with the exclusion of High Court jurisdiction in service affairs, a seven-judge Bench of the Supreme Court declared that Article 32 and Article 226 of the Constitution, which grants the power of judicial review over legislative action to the Supreme Court and the High Courts, is an integral and essential feature of the basic structure of the Constitution in L. Chandra Kumar v. Union of India (1997). The Bench held that if a law excluded the jurisdiction of the High Court without setting up an alternative arrangement for judicial review, it would be violation of the basic structure and hence outside the constituent power of the Parliament.

== Provisions of the Constitution ==
The following is a list of Articles of the Constitution of India related to the judicial review:

| Part No | Part | Article No | Article |
|---|---|---|---|
| 3 | Fundamental Rights | 13 | Laws inconsistent with or in derogation of the Fundamental Rights |
| 3 | Fundamental Rights | 32 | Remedies for enforcement of rights conferred by Part 3 of Constitution of India |
| 5 | The Union | 131 | Original jurisdiction of the Supreme Court |
| 5 | The Union | 132 | Appellate jurisdiction of Supreme Court in appeals from High Courts in certain cases |
| 5 | The Union | 133 | Appellate jurisdiction of Supreme Court in appeals from High Courts in regard to civil matters |
| 5 | The Union | 134 | Appellate jurisdiction of Supreme Court in regard to criminal matters |
| 5 | The Union | 135 | Jurisdiction and powers of the Federal Court of India under existing law to be exercisable by the Supreme Court |
| 5 | The Union | 136 | Special leave to appeal by the Supreme Court |
| 5 | The Union | 141 | Law declared by Supreme Court to be binding on all courts |
| 5 | The Union | 142 | Enforcement of decrees and orders of Supreme Court |
| 5 | The Union | 143 | Power of President to consult Supreme Court |
| 6 | The State | 226 | Power of High Courts to issue certain writs |
| 6 | The State | 227 | Power of superintendence over all courts by the High Court |
| 11 | Relations between the Union and the States | 245 | Extent of laws made by Parliament and by the Legislatures of States |
| 11 | Relations between the Union and the States | 246 | Subject-matter of laws made by Parliament and by the Legislatures of States |
| 11 | Relations between the Union and the States | 251 | Inconsistency between laws made by Parliament under articles 249 and 250 and laws made by the Legislatures of States |
| 11 | Relations between the Union and the States | 252 | Power of Parliament to legislate for two or more States by consent and adoption of such legislation by any other State |
| 11 | Relations between the Union and the States | 253 | Legislation for giving effect to international agreements |
| 11 | Relations between the Union and the States | 254 | Inconsistency between laws made by Parliament and laws made by the Legislatures of States |
| 21 | Temporary, Transitional and Special Provisions | 372 | Continuance in force of existing laws and their adaptation |

== Comparison ==
According to the comparative constitutional analysis by Dr Arne Mavčič, judicial review in India follows the American Method, where the judicial review is exercised only in concrete cases or controversies and only in laws that are in effect or actions. This method differs from French Model, where judicial review is required before the law takes effect and in the abstract, without an actual case or controversy. In the European Model, the Courts can review after the law has taken effect, though either on concrete or abstract claims.

According to classification based on the organisational structure by Dr Arne Mavčič, India follows the High Court model, where only the Supreme Court and High Courts possess the power of judicial review.

== Standard of Review ==
Judicial self-restraint concerning legislative power manifests in the form of the presumption of constitutionality of the challenged statutes. While ruling in the Charanjit Lal v. Union of India (1950), Justice Fazl Ali held

The presumption is always in favour of the constitutionality of an enactment, and the burden is upon him who attacks it to show that there has been a clear transgression of the constitutional principles.

Chief Justice S H Kapadia urged the judiciary to maintain self-restraint, respect the separation of power and not overtake the legislative function in the fifth M C Setalvad Memorial Lecture on Judicial Ethics at New Delhi on 16 April 2011.

Judicial activism, which is not grounded on a textual commitment to the Constitution or the statute, raises questions of accountability of the judiciary whose members are not chosen by any democratic process and whose members are not answerable to the electorate or the legislature or the executive.

== Role of Judicial Review ==
=== Federalism ===
While dealing with the blatant misuse of Article 356, a nine-judge Bench of the Supreme Court reiterated that judicial review is a basic structure of the Constitution and held that the proclamation of the imposing President's Rule in the State is subject to judicial review in S. R. Bommai v. Union of India (1994).

=== Fundamental Rights ===
A six-judge Bench of the Supreme Court implied that various Fundamental Rights in different Articles were mutually exclusive in the verdict of A. K. Gopalan v. State of Madras (1950). This judgment influenced the judicial interpretation of Fundamental rights for 20 years, until R.C. Cooper v. Union of India (1970), where an eleven-judge Bench overruled it and held that Fundamental Rights are not mutually exclusive.

==== Expansion ====
The verdict of R.C. Cooper v. Union of India (1970) significantly changed the way the Courts interpreted Fundamental Rights. While ruling in the case of Maneka Gandhi v. Union of India (1978), a seven-judge Bench of the Supreme Court significantly expanded the interpretation of Article 21 of the Constitution, which protects life and personal liberty except for procedure established by law. Reading Article 21 with Articles 14 and 19, the Bench concluded that the "law" has to be reasonable and the "procedure" should be just, fair and reasonable. Essentially, the Bench read Articles 14 and 19 into Article 21.

While deciding the Sunil Batra v. Delhi Administration (1978), a five-judge Bench of the Supreme Court held that the despite the lack of the Due Process Clause in the Constitution of India same consequence ensued after the decisions in R.C. Cooper v. Union of India (1970) and Maneka Gandhi v. Union of India (1978). While ruling in Bachan Singh v. State Of Punjab (1980), a five-judge Bench of the Supreme Court held that following Maneka Gandhi v. Union of India (1978), Article 21 will read to say, "no person shall be deprived of his life or personal liberty except according to fair, just and reasonable procedure established by valid law." A five-judge Bench of the Supreme Court relying on Maneka Gandhi v. Union of India (1978), Sunil Batra v. Delhi Administration (1978) and Bachan Singh v. State Of Punjab (1980) held that substantive due process is now to be applied to the Fundamental Right to life and liberty in Mohd Arif v. The Registrar (2014).
