= National Security Act, 1980 =

Act of the Parliament of India

Parliament of India
- Long title: An Act to provide for preventive detention in certain cases and for matters connected therewith.
- Citation: Act No. 65 of 1980
- Passed by: Lok Sabha
- Passed: 16 December 1980
- Considered by: Rajya Sabha
- Passed: 22 December 1980
- Assented to by: President Neelam Sanjiva Reddy
- Assented to: 27 December 1980
- Commenced: 27 December 1980

Legislative history

Initiating chamber: Lok Sabha
- Bill title: National Security Bill, 1980
- Introduced by: Home Minister Zail Singh
- Introduced: 10 December 1980
- Passed: 16 December 1980

Revising chamber: Rajya Sabha
- Passed: 22 December 1980

Repeals
- National Security Ordinance, 1980 (11 of 1980)

Amended by
- National Security (Amendment) Act, 1984 (24 of 1984); National Security (Second Amendment) Act, 1984 (60 of 1984); National Security (Amendment) Act, 1987 (27 of 1987); National Security (Amendment) Act, 1988 (43 of 1988)

Keywords
- Central Government, State Government, detention order, foreigner
- Status: In force

The National Security Act, 1980 is an act of the Indian Parliament promulgated on 23 September 1980 whose purpose is "to provide for preventive detention in certain cases and for matters connected therewith". The act extends to the whole of India. This act empowers the Central Government and State Governments to detain a person to prevent him/her from acting in any manner prejudicial to the security of India, the relations of India with foreign countries, the maintenance of public order, or the maintenance of supplies and services essential to the community it is necessary so to do. The act also gives power to the governments to detain a foreigner in a view to regulate his presence or expel from the country. The act was passed in 1980 during the Indira Gandhi Government.

As per a 1993 report 72.3 percent of 3,783 people under the law were later released due to lack of evidence.

== Historical background ==
The National Security Act is not the first law of its kind to be enacted in India. The Defence of India Act of 1915 was amended at the time of the First World War to enable the state to detain a citizen preventively. The Rowlatt Committee, approved after the First World War, recommended that the harsh and repressive I provisions of the Defence of India Act be retained permanently on the statute books. The interesting feature of the Rowlatt Bills was that they empowered the State to detain a citizen without giving the detainee any right to move the law courts, and even the assistance of lawyers was denied to a detainee. The Jallianwalla Bagh tragedy was a direct result of the protest against these Rowlatt Bills.

The Government of India Act, 1935 gave the powers of preventive detention to the State for reasons connected with defence, external affairs or discharge of functions of the Crown in its relations with the Indian States. The provincial legislatures had the power to formulate laws for reasons connected with the Maintenance of Public Order.

When the Constitution of India was enacted, Article 21 guaranteed to every person the right of life and liberty which could not be denied to him without honoring the due procedure established by law. In A.K. Gopalan's case the Supreme Court distinguished "the procedure established by law" from the "due process of law" saying that any procedure duly enacted would be a "procedure established by law". However, this view now stands reversed in Maneka Gandhi's case where the Supreme Court has held that the "procedure established by law" must also be just, fair and reasonable.

Article 22 of the Constitution laid down the scheme under which a preventive detention law could be enacted. The Preventive Detention Act, 1950 (PD Act) was enacted and it continued to be on the statute book until 2017 till being repeal by the Repealing and Amending (Second) Act, 2017. The Maintenance of Internal Security Act (MISA) was enacted in 1971. The MISA was repealed in 1977. And the only period in the Indian republic without any preventive detention law was the three-year period, beginning with the repeal of MISA in 1977 to the promulgation of the NSA in 1980.

== Detention ==
The maximum period of detention is 12 months. The order can also be made by the District Magistrate or a Commissioner of Police under their respective jurisdictions, but the detention should be reported to the State Government along with the grounds on which the order has been made. No such order shall remain in force for more than twelve days unless approved by the State Government. The National Security Act may also be invoked if a person assaults a policeman on duty.

== Criticism ==
The National Security Act along with other laws allowing preventive detention have come under wide criticism for their alleged misuse. The act's constitutional validity even during peacetime has been described by some sections as an anachronism.
