= S. R. Bommai v. Union of India =

1994 landmark judgement of the Supreme Court of India

- Court: Supreme Court of India
- Decided: 11 March 1994
- Citations: 1994 AIR 1918, 1994 SCC (3), 1, JT 1994 (2)215, 1994 SCALE(2)37

Court membership
- Judges sitting: S. Rathinavel Pandian; A. M. Ahmadi; Kuldip Singh; J. S. Verma; P. B. Sawant; K. Ramaswamy; S. C. Agrawal; Yogeshwar Dayal; B. P. Jeevan Reddy

Keywords
- Constitution of India, Article 356

S. R. Bommai & Ors. v. Union of India & Ors. ([1994] 2 SCR 644 : AIR 1994 SC 1918 : (1994)3 SCC1) is a landmark decision of the Supreme Court of India, where the Court discussed at length provisions of Article 356 of the Constitution of India and related issues. This case had a huge impact on Centre-State Relations. The judgement attempted to curb blatant misuse of Article 356 of the Constitution of India, which allowed President's rule to be imposed over state governments. S. R. Bommai, former Chief Minister of Karnataka, is widely remembered as the champion for this landmark judgment of the Supreme Court of India, considered one of the most quoted verdicts in the country's political history.

== Background (Article 356 and President’s Rule) ==
Article 356 allows the Central Government to impose President’s Rule in a State. When this happens, the elected State government and its Council of Ministers are dismissed, and the Governor (appointed by the President) takes direct control. This goes against the federal nature of India’s Constitution, where power is meant to be shared between Centre and States, and also weakens democracy by suspending an elected government.

Dr. B. R. Ambedkar, during the Constituent Assembly debates, had called Article 356 a “dead letter” and hoped it would rarely be used. He suggested that the President should first warn the State, and if needed, call for fresh elections, using Article 356 only as a last resort.

However, before the S. R. Bommai judgment, Article 356 was frequently misused by the Centre to remove State governments led by rival parties. It was invoked more than 90 times, often on doubtful grounds, making it one of the most controversial provisions of the Constitution.

== The facts ==
S. R. Bommai v. Union of India came before the bench of 9 judges (consisting of Kuldip Singh, P. B. Sawant, Katikithala Ramaswamy, S. C. Agarwal, Yogeshwar Dayal, B. P. Jeevan Reddy, S. R. Pandian, A. M. Ahmadi, J. S. Verma) under the following circumstances:

Karnataka

The Janata Party being the majority party in the Karnataka State Legislature had formed Government under the leadership of S. R. Bommai. In September 1988, the Janata Party and Lok Dal merged into a new party called Janata Dal. The Ministry was expanded with addition of 13 members. Within two days thereafter, K.R. Molakery, a legislator of Janata Dal defected from the party. He presented a letter to the Governor Pendekanti Venkatasubbaiah along with 19 letters, allegedly signed by legislators supporting the Ministry, withdrawing their support. As a result, on 19 April, the Governor sent a report to the President stating therein there were dissensions and defections in the ruling party. He further stated that in view of the withdrawal of the support by the said legislators, the chief Minister, Bommai did not command a majority in the Assembly and, hence, it was inappropriate under the Constitution, to have the State administered by an Executive consisting of Council of Ministers which did not command the majority in the state assembly. He, therefore, recommended to the President that he should exercise power under Article 356(1). However, on the next day seven out of the nineteen legislators who had allegedly written the said letters to the Governor sent letters to him complaining that their signatures were obtained on the earlier letters by misrepresentation and affirmed their support to the Ministry. The Chief Minister and his Law Minister met the Governor the same day and informed him about the decision to summon the Assembly, even by bringing forward the scheduled session, to prove the confidence of assembly in his Ministry. To the same effect, he sent a telex message to the President. The Governor however sent yet another report to the President on the same day i.e., 20-4-1989, and stated that the Chief Minister had lost the confidence of the majority in the House and repeated his earlier request for action under Article 356(1). On that very day, the President issued the Proclamation in question with the recitals already referred to above. The Proclamation was, thereafter approved by the Parliament as required by Article 356(3).

A writ petition was filed on 26 April 1989 challenging the validity of the proclamation. A special bench of 3 judges of Karnataka High Court dismissed the writ petition.

Meghalaya

On 11 October 1991 the president issued a proclamation under Article 356(1) dismissing the government of Meghalaya and dissolving the legislative assembly. The Proclamation stated that the President was satisfied on the basis of the report from the Governor and other information received by him that the situation had arisen in which the Government of the State could not be carried on in accordance with the provisions of the Constitution. The Government was dismissed and the Assembly was dissolved accordingly.

Nagaland

On 7 August 1988, the president issued the proclamation on the basis of Governor Report and dismissed the Government of Nagaland thus dissolving the Legislative assembly. Vamuzo, leader of opposition party, challenged the validity of Proclamation in Gauhati High Court. A Division Bench comprising the Chief Justice and Hansaria, J. heard the petition. The Bench differed on the effect and operation of Article 74 (Constitution of India)(2) and hence the matter was referred to the third Judge. But before the third learned judge could hear the matter, the Union of India led by Rajiv Gandhi's Congress Party moved this Court for grant of special leave which was granted and the proceedings in the High Court were stayed.

Madhya Pradesh, Rajasthan and Himachal Pradesh

On account of the Babri Masjid demolition, communal riots spread out in the entire country. The Central Government under the leadership of Shri P V Narsimharao of the Congress party banned RSS, VHP and Bajrang Dal. The Central Government dismissed the BJP Governments of Madhya Pradesh, Rajasthan and Himachal Pradesh. As a result, on 15 December 1992, the president issued the proclamation under Article 356 dismissing the State Governments and dissolving the Legislative Assemblies of Madhya Pradesh, Himachal Pradesh and Rajasthan. The validity of these proclamations was challenged by the Writs in the appropriate High Courts. The Madhya Pradesh High Court allowed the petition, but writ petition relating to Rajasthan and Himachal Pradesh were withdrawn to Supreme Court.

All the above said petition contained similar question of law and therefore they were heard conjointly by the Hon’ble Supreme Court. The arguments in the S. R. Bommai’s case commenced in the first week of October 1993 and were concluded in the last week of December 1993.

== The contentions ==
S. R. Bommai v. Union of India raised serious question of law relating to Proclamation of President's Rule and dissolution of Legislative assemblies according to Article 356 of the Constitution of India.

The first and most important question which the Supreme Court had to determine was whether the Presidential Proclamation under Article 356 was justiciable and if so to what extent.

The second contention was whether the President has unfettered powers to issue Proclamation under Article 356(1) of the Constitution.

It was contended that since the Proclamation under Article 356(1) would be issued by the President on the advice of the Council of Ministers given under Article 74(1) of the Constitution and since Clause (2) of the said Article bars inquiry into the question whether any, and if so, what advice was tendered by Ministers to the President, judicial review of the reasons which led to the issuance of the Proclamation also stands barred. Whether the Legislature dissolved by the Presidents proclamation can be revived if the president proclamation is set aside. Whether the validity of the Proclamation issued under Article 356(1) can be challenged even after it has been approved by both Houses of Parliament under Article 356(3).

It was also contended that whether any relief's can be granted when the validity of proclamation is challenged and whether the court can grant an interim stay against holding the fresh election.

Whether a president can dissolve the legislature without having obtained the approval of both the Houses of the Legislature. It was contended that Secularism being a basic feature of the Constitution, a State government can be dismissed if it is guilty of nonsecular acts.

== The principles laid down by Supreme Court ==
The Supreme Court laid down certain guidelines so as to prevent the misuse of Article 356 of the constitution.

1. The majority enjoyed by the Council of Ministers shall be tested on the floor of the House.
2. Centre should give a warning to the state and a time period of one week to reply.
3. The court cannot question the advice tendered by the CoMs to the President but it can question the material behind the satisfaction of the President. Hence, Judicial Review will involve three questions only:
  1. Is there any material behind the proclamation
  2. Is the material relevant.
  3. Was there any malafide use of power.
4. If there is improper use of Article 356 then the court will provide remedy.
5. Under Article 356(3) it is the limitation on the powers of the President. Hence, the president shall not take any irreversible action until the proclamation is approved by the Parliament i.e. he shall not dissolve the assembly.
6. Article 356 is justified only when there is a breakdown of constitutional machinery and not administrative machinery

Article 356 shall be used sparingly by the center, otherwise it is likely to destroy the constitutional structure between the center and the states. Even Bhimrao Ambedkar envisaged it to remain a 'dead letter' in the constitution.

Based on the report of the Sarkaria Commission on Centre–State Relations(1988), the Supreme Court in Bommai case (1994) enlisted the situations where the exercise of power under Article 356 could be proper or improper.

Imposition of President's Rule in a state would be proper in the following situations:

- Where after general elections to the assembly, no party secures a majority, that is, Hung Assembly.
- Where the party having a majority in the assembly declines to form a ministry and the governor cannot find a coalition ministry commanding a majority in the assembly.
- Where a ministry resigns after its defeat in the assembly and no other party is willing or able to form a ministry commanding a majority in the assembly.
- Where a constitutional direction of the Central government is disregarded by the state government.
- Internal subversion where, for example, a government is deliberately acting against the Constitution and the law or is fomenting a violent revolt.
- Physical breakdown where the government willfully refuses to discharge its constitutional obligations endangering the security of the state.

The imposition of President's Rule in a state would be improper under the following situations:

- Where a ministry resigns or is dismissed on losing majority support in the assembly and the governor recommends imposition of President's Rule without probing the possibility of forming an alternative ministry.
- Where the governor makes his own assessment of the support of a ministry in the assembly and recommends imposition of President's Rule without allowing the ministry to prove its majority on the floor of the Assembly.
- Where the ruling party enjoying majority support in the assembly has suffered a massive defeat in the general elections to the Lok Sabha such as in 1977 and 1980.
- Internal disturbances not amounting to internal subversion or physical breakdown.
- Maladministration in the state or allegations of corruption against the ministry or stringent financial exigencies of the state.
- Where the state government is not given prior warning to rectify itself except in case of extreme urgency leading to disastrous consequences.
- Where the power is used to sort out intra-party problems of the ruling party, or for a purpose extraneous or irrelevant to the one for which it has been conferred by the Constitution.

== Malafide exercise of Article 356 ==
While dealing with the question as to whether the Presidential Proclamation under Article 356 was justiciable all the judges were unanimous in holding that the presidential proclamation was justiciable. The Supreme Court held that the proclamation under Article 356(1) is not immune from judicial review. The validity of the Proclamation issued by the President under Article 356(1) is judicially reviewable to the extent of examining whether it was issued on the basis of any material at all or whether the material was relevant or whether the Proclamation was issued in the malafide exercise of the power. The Supreme Court or the High court can strike down the proclamation if it is found to be malafide or based on wholly irrelevant or extraneous grounds. The deletion of Clause (5) by the 44th Amendment Act, removes the cloud on the reviewability of the action. When a prima facie case is made out in the challenge to the Proclamation, the Union of India has to produce the material on the basis of which action was taken. It cannot refuse to do so, if it seeks to defend the action. The court will not go into the correctness of the material or its adequacy. Its inquiry is limited to whether the material was relevant to the action. Even if part of the material is irrelevant, the court cannot interfere so long as there is some material which is relevant to the action taken. It is submitted that the validity of the Presidents proclamation under Article 356 is justiciable.

=== Powers of President under Article 356 ===
The second question which was taken into consideration by the court was that whether the President has unfettered powers to issue Proclamation under Article 356(1) of the Constitution of India. It was contended that The Supreme Court in this regard held that the power conferred by Article 356 upon the President is a conditioned power. It is not an absolute power. This satisfaction may be formed on the basis of the report of the Governor or on the basis of other information received by him or both. The existence of relevant material is a pre-condition to the formation of satisfaction. The satisfaction must be formed on relevant material. The dissolution of the Legislative Assembly should be resorted to only when it is necessary for achieving the purposes of the proclamation. The exercise of the power is made subject to approval of the both Houses of Parliament.

=== Article 74 and justiciability of advice of Council of Ministers to the President ===
In regard to the contention, that Article 74(2) bars the inquiry into advice which was tendered by Council of Ministers to the President, the Supreme Court at length considered the scope and effect of Article 74(2). Here it would be appropriate to mention that article 74(2) of the constitution provides that the court cannot inquire as to any, and if so what, advice was tendered by Council of Ministers to the President. In this regard Supreme Court held that although Article 74(2) bars judicial review so far as the advice given by the Ministers is concerned, it does not bar scrutiny of the material on the basis of which the advice is given. The material on the basis of which advice was tendered does not become part of the advice. The Courts are justified in probing as to whether there was any material on the basis of which the advice was given, and whether it was relevant for such advice and the President could have acted on it. Hence when the Courts undertake an inquiry into the existence of such material, the prohibition contained in Article 74(2) does not negate their right to know about the factual existence of any such material. This is not to say that the Union Government cannot raise the plea of privilege under Section 123 of the Evidence Act. As and when such privilege against disclosure is claimed, the Courts will examine such claim within the parameters of the said section on its merits. But Article 74(2) as such is no bar to the power of judicial review regarding the material on the basis of which the proclamation is issued.

=== Invalidation of proclamation ===
The Supreme Court also held that the power of the court to restore the government to office in case it finds the proclamation to be unconstitutional, it is, in Courts opinion, beyond question. Even in case the proclamation is approved by the Parliament it would be open to the court to restore the State government to its office in case it strikes down the proclamation as unconstitutional. If this power were not conceded to the court, the very power of judicial review would be rendered nugatory and the entire exercise meaningless. If the court cannot grant the relief flowing from the invalidation of the proclamation, it may as well decline to entertain the challenge to the proclamation altogether. For, there is no point in the court entertaining the challenge, examining it, calling upon the Union Government to produce the material on the basis of which the requisite satisfaction was formed and yet not give the relief.

=== Powers of Parliament ===
Moreover, the Supreme Court firmly held that there was no reason to make a distinction between the Proclamation so approved and legislation enacted by the Parliament. If the Proclamation is invalid, it does not stand validated merely because it is approved of by the Parliament. The grounds for challenging the validity of the Proclamation may be different from those challenging the validity of legislation. However, that does not make any difference to the vulnerability of the Proclamation on the limited grounds available. And therefore the validity of the Proclamation issued under Article 356(1) can be challenged even after it has been approved by both Houses of Parliament under Article 356(3).

=== Elections to Legislature pending final Disposal of case ===
Another issue taken into consideration by the Supreme Court was whether any relief can be granted when the validity of proclamation is challenged and whether the court can grant an interim stay against holding the fresh election. In this regard the Court held that the Court will have power by an interim injunction, to restrain the holding of fresh elections to the Legislative Assembly pending the final disposal of the challenge to the validity of the proclamation to avoid the fait accompli and the remedy of judicial review being rendered fruitless.

=== Secularism ===
Supreme Court while adjudicating that a State Government cannot follow particular religion discussed at length the concept of Secularism. The Court held that Secularism is one of the basic features of the Constitution. Secularism is a positive concept of equal treatment of all religions. This attitude is described by some as one of neutrality towards religion or as one of benevolent neutrality. While freedom of religion is guaranteed to all persons in India, from the point of view of the State, the religion, faith or belief of a person is immaterial. To the state, all are equal and are entitled to be treated equally. In matters of State, religion has no place. And if the Constitution requires the State to be secular in thought and action, the same requirement attaches to political parties as well. The Constitution does not recognize, it does not permit, mixing religion and State power. Both must be kept apart. That is the constitutional injunction. None can say otherwise so long as this Constitution governs this country. Politics and religion cannot be mixed. Any State government which pursues nonsecular policies or nonsecular course of action acts contrary to the constitutional mandate and renders itself amenable to action under Article 356. Given the above position, it is clear that if any party or organization seeks to fight the elections on the basis of a plank which has the proximate effect of eroding the secular philosophy of the Constitution would certainly be guilty of following an unconstitutional course of action.

== Implications and criticism ==
This case in the history of the Indian Constitution has great implications on Centre-State Relations. It is in this case that the Supreme Court boldly marked out the paradigm and limitations within which Article 356 has to function. The Supreme Court said that Article 356 is an extreme power and is to be used as a last resort in cases where it is manifest that there is an impasse and the constitutional machinery in a State has collapsed. The views expressed by the court in this case are similar to the concern showed by the Sarkaria Commission.

The principles laid down in this case put a bar on the dismissal of the state government by the centre for political gains.

It was in this case that the court firmly laid down certain provision relating to presidential proclamation issued Under Article 356. The Court held that Presidential proclamation under Article 356 is not absolute and the power conferred by Article 356 on president is conditioned power. The Supreme Court held that presidential proclamation is not immune from judicial review. Moreover, if the presidential proclamation is held unconstitutional, the legislature dissolved by the presidential proclamation can be revived. It was also contended that the Articles 74(2) bars the court from inquiring about the material on the basis of which the proclamation is issued, but the court rejected this contention.

Although the Supreme Court limited President's Rule, people criticized that the Court took such a long time to deliver the verdict and allowed, in the cases of Karnataka and Meghalaya, the illegality to be perpetuated and ultimately deprive the citizens of those states to be governed by their chosen representative.

Still, the judgement delivered by the Supreme Court put a check on arbitrary dismissal of state governments in future and strengthen the federal structure of Indian polity which had hitherto been damaged on several occasions particularly when different political parties were in power at the Centre and the State.

== See also ==
- List of landmark court decisions in India
- State of Tamil Nadu v. Governor of Tamil Nadu
