= In re: Assent, Withholding or Reservation of Bills by the Governor and the President of India =

2025 case of the Supreme Court of India

In re: Presidential Reference on Powers of the Governor and President
- Court: Supreme Court of India
- Submitted: 22 July 2025
- Started: 19 August 2025
- Decided: 20 November 2025
- Docket nos.: Special Reference No. 1 of 2025
- Citation: 2025 INSC 1333

Case history
- Prior action: State of Tamil Nadu v. Governor of Tamil Nadu

Court membership
- Judges sitting: CJI B. R. Gavai, J. Surya Kant, J. Vikram Nath, J. P. S. Narasimha & J. A. S. Chandurkar of the Constitution Bench

Case opinions
- Advisory opinion sought under Article 143 of the Constitution of India

Laws applied
- Constitution of India — Articles 143, 200, 201

Keywords
- Presidential reference, Governor's assent, timelines for assent, Articles 200 and 201

In re: Assent, Withholding or Reservation of Bills by the Governor and the President of India, 2025 INSC 1333, is a presidential reference heard by the Supreme Court of India regarding the Court's authority to impose deadlines for the Governor and President under Articles 200 and 201 of the Constitution.

The matter arose out of the powers of the President of India, under Article 143 of the Constitution, to seek Supreme Court’s advisory jurisdiction on questions of law or fact. The president referred a total of 14 questions, challenging the Court's earlier verdict in State of Tamil Nadu v. Governor of Tamil Nadu, which ruled that the Governor of a state cannot exercise an absolute veto or a pocket veto over legislation duly passed by the State Legislatures.

The case was heard by a five-judge constitution bench of the Court led by Chief Justice of India B. R. Gavai. The court heard the matter for ten days and reserved its judgement on 11 September 2025.

== List of questions ==
1. What are the constitutional options before a Governor when a Bill is presented to him under Article 200 of the Constitution of India?

2. Is the Governor bound by the aid & advice tendered by the Council of Ministers while exercising all the options available with him when a Bill is presented before him under Article 200 of the Constitution of India?

3. Is the exercise of constitutional discretion by the Governor under Article 200 of the Constitution of India justiciable?

4. Is Article 361 of the Constitution of India an absolute bar to the judicial review in relation to the actions of a Governor under Article 200 of the Constitution of India?

5. In the absence of a constitutionally prescribed time limit, and the manner of exercise of powers by the Governor, can timelines be imposed and the manner of exercise be prescribed through judicial orders for the exercise of all powers under Article 200 of the Constitution of India by the Governor?

6. Is the exercise of constitutional discretion by the President under Article 201 of the Constitution of India justiciable?

7. In the absence of a constitutionally prescribed timeline and the manner of exercise of powers by the President, can time lines be imposed and the manner of exercise be prescribed through judicial orders for the exercise of discretion by the President under Article 201 of the Constitution of India?

8. In light of the constitutional scheme governing the powers of the President, is the President required to seek advice of the Supreme Court by way of a reference under Article 143 of the Constitution of India and take the opinion of the Supreme Court when the Governor reserves a Bill for the President’s assent or otherwise?

9. Are the decisions of the Governor and the President under Article 200 and Article 201 of the Constitution of India, respectively, justiciable at a stage anterior into the law coming into force? Is it permissible for the Courts to undertake judicial adjudication over the contents of a Bill, in any manner, before it becomes law?

10. Can the exercise of constitutional powers and the orders of/by the President/Governor be substituted in any manner under Article 142 of the Constitution of India?

11. Is a law made by the State legislature a law in force without the assent of the Governor granted under Article 200 of the Constitution of India?

12. In view of the proviso to Article 145 (3) of the Constitution of India, is it not mandatory for any bench of this Hon’ble Court to first decide as to whether the question involved in the proceedings before it is of such a nature which involves substantial questions of law as to the interpretation of the Constitution and to refer it to a bench of minimum five Judges?

13. Do the powers of the Supreme Court under Article 142 of the Constitution of India limited to matters of procedural law or Article 142 of the Constitution of India extends to issuing directions /passing orders which are contrary to or inconsistent with existing substantive or procedural provisions of the Constitution or law in force?

14. Does the Constitution bar any other jurisdiction of the Supreme Court to resolve disputes between the Union Government and the State Governments except by way of a suit under Article 131 of the Constitution of India?

== Proceedings ==
The Presidential Reference was opposed by several opposition parties arguing that it was a "an appeal, or review in disguise [...] and attempt to disturb the findings, and nullify the effect of the judgment already rendered" by the Court in State of Tamil Nadu v. Governor of Tamil Nadu.

== Judgment ==
On 20 November 2025, the Court provided its opinion for the 14 referred questions. Critically, the judges opined that courts cannot prescribe or impose a timeline for the grant of assent ("deemed assent") by the Government or the President, but at the same time, governors do not have the power to indefinitely delay bills passed by state assemblies.

In the opinion, Chief Justice of India B. R. Gavai noted "Articles 200 and 201 of the [Indian] Constitution are framed to allow elasticity. The imposition of a timeline is strictly contrary to the Constitution... The concept of deemed assent is against the spirit of the Constitution and the doctrine of separation of powers."

The 111-page opinion, which is not binding, did not have a sole author and was rendered as an "Opinion of the Court." Questions 12 and 14 were returned unaswered.

== See also ==
- State of Tamil Nadu v. Governor of Tamil Nadu
- List of presidential references

== Sources ==
- Supreme Court of India, 2025 INSC 1333 "Opinion of the Court" in Special Reference No. 1 of 2025 IN RE: Assent, Withholding or Reservation of Bills by the Governor and the President of India (PDF)

This article incorporates text from judicial opinions and related texts from the Supreme Court of India. As a work of the Supreme Court, the text is in the public domain.
