= State of Tamil Nadu v. Governor of Tamil Nadu =

Supreme Court of India case examining powers of governors

- Court: Supreme Court of India
- Full case name: The State of Tamil Nadu versus the Governor of Tamil Nadu & the Union of India
- Decided: 8 April 2025
- Citations: 2025 INSC 481

Court membership
- Judges sitting: J. B. Pardiwala, J. and R. Mahadevan, J.

Case opinions
- The State governor cannot exercise an absolute or pocket veto over legislation duly passed by the State legislature. The State governor cannot reserve the re-passed bill for the President's consideration. Furthermore, the Court laid out the grounds for judicial review for actions of the Governor and President under Articles 200 and 201 of the Constitution, including time limits to prevent undue delay in granting assent.
- Decision by: J. B. Pardiwala, J. and R. Mahadevan, J.

Keywords
- Governor; Absolute veto; Pocket veto

Area of law
- Constitutional law

The State of Tamil Nadu v. the Governor of Tamil Nadu & the Union of India, 2025 INSC 481, is a landmark decision by the Supreme Court of India, which ruled that the Governor of a state cannot exercise an absolute veto or a pocket veto over legislation duly passed by the State Legislatures.

== Background ==
Between 13 January 2020 and 28 April 2023, the Tamil Nadu Legislative Assembly passed 12 bills, to amend institutional oversight and appointment processes of state universities, and submitted these bills to the Governor of Tamil Nadu for assent. Two of these bills shifted powers of inspection and inquiry from the Governor (acting as ex officio Chancellor) to the State Government, while eight others transferred authority to appoint Vice-Chancellors of state universities from the Governor to the State Government. Additional provisions included replacing Secretary to Department of Law in university syndicates with Secretary to Department of Finance, and centralizing oversight under the Department of Higher Education.

On 31 October 2023, the Government of Tamil Nadu filed a writ petition before the Supreme Court of India, contesting Governor R.N. Ravi's prolonged withholding of assent to the bills.

On 13 November 2023, the Governor resolved the pending bills, withholding assent for 10 bills and reserving 2 bills for the consideration of the President of India. In response to the Governor's actions, a special session of the Tamil Nadu Legislative Assembly was convened on 18 November 2023. During this session, the 10 bills denied assent were reintroduced, reconsidered, and re-approved by the Assembly. The re-passed bills were formally transmitted to the Governor's Secretariat on the same day.

== Analysis ==
Based on the plain reading of Article 200 of the Indian Constitution, the Supreme Court affirmed that a Governor possesses three constitutionally permissible courses of action when presented with a bill passed by the state legislature. These include granting assent to enact the bill into law, withholding assent while returning the bill to the state legislature for reconsideration, or reserving the bill for the President's consideration.

=== Absolute veto ===
The court explicitly rejected the Attorney General of India's contention that a fourth option—permitting the Governor to withhold assent without mandating the bill's return for reconsideration—existed. This argument had sought to rely on Union of India v. Valluri Basavaiah Chowdhary (1979), a five-judge constitutional bench decision, which the Attorney General claimed implicitly recognized such authority through the phrase "unless the procedure indicated in the first proviso is followed." Furthermore, the Attorney General claimed that State of Punjab v. Principal Secretary to the Governor of Punjab (2024), which held that Governor do not have absolute veto power, was decided without giving due consideration for the precedent set by Valluri Basavaiah Chowdhary (1979).

However, the court clarified that the first proviso of Article 200 obligates the Governor to return a bill to the legislature "as soon as possible" if assent is withheld. But, no procedural expediency is required from the legislature during reconsideration. Therefore, it further interpreted the term "falls-through" in Valluri Basavaiah Chowdhary to apply solely to scenarios where the legislature chooses not to re-pass the bill, thereby allowing it to lapse. Furthermore, the Article 200 mandated the Governor to assent to the reconsidered bill, which was passed with or without amendments. Therefore, the court concluded that the three-judge bench's ruling in State of Punjab (2024) remained valid, as it aligned with constitutional intent and did not conflict with prior precedents. Consequently, the judgment reinforced that Governors lack an absolute veto power under Article 200.

=== Pocket veto ===
The Supreme Court emphasized that the phrase "withhold assent" under Article 200 of the Indian Constitution must be interpreted as a temporary deferral of assent, not denial of assent. The Court clarified that such deferral operates within the procedural framework of Article 200s first proviso, which mandates that if assent is withheld, the bill must be returned to the legislature for reconsideration. It underscored the Governor's role as strictly recommendatory, noting that the phrase "if the Bill is passed again by the House or Houses with or without amendment" explicitly confirms the Governor's suggestions carry no binding force. Furthermore, the Court emphasized that the directive "the Governor shall not withhold assent therefrom" upon the bill's re-passage signifies the conclusion of the temporary deferral, thereby precluding prolonged obstruction. By anchoring this reasoning in constitutional text, the Court concluded that Article 200s procedural safeguards prevent the Governor's power from being misconstrued as a pocket veto.

=== Re-passed bill and President's review ===
The Supreme Court underscored that Article 200s use of the conjunction "or" between the three options—granting assent, withholding assent for state legislature's reconsideration, or reserving the bill for the President's review—establishes their mutual exclusivity. Once the Governor exercises one option, the others become unavailable. Specifically, if assent is withheld, the first proviso's mechanism is triggered, compelling the Governor to return the bill to the legislature. The Court clarified that compliance with this procedure—including legislative reconsideration and re-passage of the bill—obligates the Governor to grant assent, leaving no scope to subsequently reserve the bill for presidential consideration.

However, the Court acknowledged a narrow exception: if a bill re-presented to the Governor after reconsideration introduces wholly new or divergent provisions, rendering the legislature's actions inconsistent with the mandate to "reconsider the Bill accordingly," the Governor may reserve it for the President's review.

The Court further emphasized that any reservation of a re-passed bill for presidential consideration, premised on non-compliance with the first proviso's procedure, would remain subject to judicial review.

=== Time-limit for Governor's actions ===
==== Constituent Assembly debates ====
The Supreme Court analyzed the Constituent Assembly debates on prescribing temporal limits for governor's action under Article 200 of the Indian Constitution, drawing parallels to analogous discussions on Article 111 (pertaining to presidential assent to central legislation). The draft Article of Article 111 initially proposed a six-week timeframe for the President to return bills to Parliament for reconsideration. However, Dr. B.R. Ambedkar moved an amendment replacing "not later than six weeks" with "as soon as possible," which the Assembly ultimately adopted despite concerns over potential legislative delays. The Court observed that this shift reflected the Assembly's implicit trust in Governors to discharge their constitutional obligations under Article 200 with diligence and timeliness.

Nevertheless, the court acknowledged that apprehensions voiced during the Constituent Assembly debates materialized over time, as documented by the Sarkaria and Punchhi Commission reports, which highlighted systemic delays in governor's assents, with bills often languishing in Governors' secretariats for years. The Court condemned such indefinite inaction, ruling that prolonged failure to act on bills effectively confers an impermissible "pocket veto" on Governors—a practice antithetical to India's constitutional framework.

==== Relevant precedents ====
The Supreme Court examined precedents addressing the justiciability of actions lacking explicit time limits, emphasizing that constitutional functionaries must adhere to the principle of "reasonable time" to fulfill their duties. In Durga Pada Ghosh v. State of West Bengal (1972), a three-judge bench interpreted the phrase "as soon as possible" as necessitating diligent and prompt action by authorities, free from avoidable delay. This principle was reaffirmed in Ram Chand v. Union of India (1994), where the Court held that delays in exercising constitutional powers—even absent fixed timelines—must not subvert the mandate's underlying objectives. In State of Telangana v. Governor of Telangana (2024), where the Court underscored that the phrase "as soon as possible" carries significant constitutional weight, obliging Governors to act with urgency.

Similarly, in Keisham Meghachandra Singh v. Speaker, Manipur Legislative Assembly (2020), the Court ruled that Speakers, while vested with exclusive jurisdiction over disqualification petitions, remain bound to decide such matters within a reasonable timeframe. The judgment clarified that judicial review could intervene to ensure timely resolutions. In A.G. Perarivalan v. State of Tamil Nadu (2023), which affirmed that while Governors enjoy a degree of immunity, prolonged inaction affecting individual rights—such as delays in deciding mercy petitions—remains subject to judicial scrutiny.

The Supreme Court dismissed the respondent's reliance on the five-judge bench decision in Purushothaman Nambudiri v. State of Kerala (1961), which had been cited to argue against reading a time limit into Articles 200 and 201 of the Indian Constitution. The Court clarified that the Nambudiri ruling was narrowly confined to addressing the status of bills pending governor's assent following the dissolution of a state legislature. In that case, the Court had concluded that such bills do not lapse upon dissolution, owing to the absence of explicit time constraints under Article 200. However, the judgment emphasized that Nambudiri did not adjudicate on the urgency or expediency expected of Governors in discharging their duties under Article 200. Crucially, the Nambudiri decision neither endorsed nor implied that Governors could exercise their powers under Article 200 without regard to timeliness, nor did it negate the principle that constitutional functionaries must act within a reasonable timeframe.

==== Prescribing time limits ====
The Supreme Court clarified that judicially prescribing a reasonable time frame for Governors to act on bills under Article 200 does not amend the Constitution, as it serves only to enable judicial review without altering constitutional procedures. While constitutions like those of the U.S. and Pakistan expressly prescribe time-limits—where inaction triggers automatic assent—judicially prescribing such limits will allow courts to scrutinize delays while permitting Governors to justify prolonged inaction with valid reasons.

The Court highlighted the precedents such as Keisham Meghachandra Singh v. Speaker, Manipur Legislative Assembly (2020) and Periyammal v. Rajamani (2025), where the Court had prescribed the time limits. The court argued that given that the inaction of constitutional authorities is subject to judicial review, well-defined standards are essential to assess its justiciability. The timelines prescribed in this judgment fulfill this role by establishing objective criteria for scrutiny. Relying on recommendations from the Sarkaria and Punchhi Commissions, the Court prescribed general time limits to ensure governor's decisions align with constitutional expediency. Delays beyond these limits are subject to judicial review, empowering courts to mandate timely decisions or, exceptionally under Article 142, deem assent granted.

The Court emphasized that such limits prevent Governors from wielding a pocket veto under Article 200, ensuring law-making processes are not obstructed without reasonable justification.

=== Governor's discretion ===
The Supreme Court underscored the constitutional evolution of Governor's under Article 200, noting that the phrase "in his discretion"—present in Section 75 of the Government of India Act,1935—was deliberately omitted during the drafting of Article 200. This omission signaled the framers' intent to curtail the Governor's discretionary powers regarding the reservation of bills for presidential consideration, which had existed under colonial-era legislation.

However, in B.K. Pavitra v. Union of India (2019), a two-judge bench ruled that Governors retained discretion to reserve bills for the President's review even against the advice of the Council of Ministers, emphasizing the need for such decisions to reflect "careful reflection and statesmanship" without undermining democratic federalism. The judgment also acknowledged the impracticality of exhaustively defining scenarios warranting such reservations.

The Court, however, critiqued B.K. Pavitra for failing to reconcile its findings with binding precedents set by larger benches, particularly Samsher Singh v. State of Punjab (1974) and MP Special Police Establishment v. State of MP (2004). In Samsher Singh, a seven-judge bench confined the Governor's discretionary authority to the second proviso of Article 200, which applies solely to bills diminishing the High Court's powers. The Court clarified that Samsher Singh's reference to Governor's independence from ministerial advice pertained exclusively to this narrow exception. In M.P. Special Police Establishment v. State of M.P. (2004), a five-judge bench of the Supreme Court recognized a limited scope for Governor's discretion under Article 163(2) of the Constitution, even in the absence of explicit constitutional provisions granting such authority. The Court held that Governors may act independently in exceptional situations where adherence to ministerial advice would inherently endanger democratic principles, such as cases involving peril to democracy, manifest bias in the Council of Ministers' recommendations, or instances precipitating a complete breakdown of the rule of law. The Court clarified that M.P. Special Police Establishment did not dilute the general rule established in Samsher Singh v. State of Punjab (1974), emphasizing that such discretionary exceptions remain narrowly confined to extraordinary circumstances.The Court held that by overlooking these precedent, B.K. Pavitra was declared per incuriam (decided in ignorance of binding law), and reaffirmed that the Governor's discretionary powers under Article 200 remain strictly limited to constitutionally specified contexts.

== Judgement ==
On 8 April 2025, a two-judge bench of the Supreme Court of India comprising Justices J. B. Pardiwala and R. Mahadevan delivered its ruling in the case. The Court held that the Governor of the States lack constitutional authority to exercise an absolute veto or a pocket veto over legislation duly passed by State Legislatures, emphasizing the settled conventions of Parliamentary democracy.

In his opening remarks, Justice J. B. Pardiwala contextualized the Court's intervention by observing:

While the framers of the Constitution set out with the vision [that] the Governor would be the constitutional head, a sagacious counsellor and advisor to the ministry—someone who can pour oil over troubled waters—what has unfolded before us in this litigation has been quite the opposite. This Court has been called upon to calm the troubled waters stirred by the ensuing long-drawn battle of a high constitutional order between the petitioner and the respondent.

=== Three options under Article 200 ===
The Court noted that Governor possesses three constitutionally permissible courses of action when presented with a bill passed by the state legislature granting assent—withholding assent for state legislature's reconsideration, or reserving the bill for the President's review. Once the assent was withheld, bill must be returned to the State legislature for reconsideration. When the State legislature reconsiders and passes the bill, with or without the amendments, Article 200 obligates the Governor to grant assent. Therefore, the Court held that Governors lack an absolute veto power under Article 200. Furthermore, the Court noted that the phrase "withhold assent" signifies a temporary deferral of assent, not denial of assent. Therefore, the Court held that there is no pocket veto under Article 200.

The Court noted that the three options are mutually exclusive that once the Governor exercises one option, the others become unavailable. Once Governor withheld assent, and state legislature reconsidered and passed the bill, without any changes, or with the changes recommended by the Governor, there is no scope to subsequently reserve the bill for presidential consideration.

=== Time limit and judicial review ===
The Court held that inaction of Governor is subject to judicial review. It stated that well-defined standards are essential to assess its justiciability, and prescribed the following time limits for Governor's actions under Article 200:

- Withholding assent or reserving a bill: If the Governor withholds assent to a bill or reserves it for the President's consideration on the advice of the State Council of Ministers, such action must be taken immediately, subject to a maximum period of one month.
- Withholding assent contrary to advice: If the Governor withholds assent against the advice of the Council of Ministers, the bill must be returned to the legislature within three months, accompanied by a message explaining the objections.
- Reserving a bill contrary to advice: If the Governor reserves a bill for the President's consideration against the Council of Ministers' advice, such reservation must be made within three months.
- Bills re-passed after reconsideration: Upon receiving a re-passed bill following legislative reconsideration (under the first proviso of Article 200), the Governor must grant assent immediately, subject to a maximum period of one month.

=== Governor's discretion ===
The Supreme Court affirmed that Governors lack discretionary authority under Article 200 and must act solely on the advice of the State Council of Ministers, except in the following constitutionally specified scenarios:

- Bills under the second proviso to Article 200: Applies to bills that derogate from the powers of the High Court, where the Governor may act independently to reserve such bills for presidential consideration.
- Bills requiring presidential assent under specific constitutional provisions:Includes bills covered by Articles 31A, 31C, 254(2), 288(2), or 360(4)(a)(ii), which mandate presidential assent to secure immunity from constitutional challenges or operational validity.
- Bills threatening foundational democratic principles:Applies to bills that, if enacted, would undermine the Constitution's core principles of representative democracy, as outlined in M.P. Special Police Establishment v. State of M.P. (2004).

=== Grounds for judicial review ===
The Supreme Court outlined the following grounds on which a State Government may legally challenge a Governor's decision to reserve a bill for the President's consideration against State Cabinet's advice:

- Reservation under second proviso to Article 200: The Governor must provide clear reasons and identify specific bill provisions that allegedly derogate the High Court's constitutional powers. A challenge may argue the bill does not endanger the High Court's constitutional role.
- Reservation due to constitutional requirements: With regards to the bills covered by Articles 31A, 31C, 254(2), 288(2), or 360(4)(a)(ii), which mandate presidential assent, the Governor must specifically cite constitutional provisions necessitating presidential assent. A challenge may allege irrelevant, mala fide, arbitrary, or extraneous reasons for reservation.
- Reservation based on threats to democracy: The Governor must detail provisions endangering democratic principles and explain why judicial recourse is insufficient. Challenges may contest failure to furnish valid reasons or unconstitutional motives.
- Reservation on impermissible grounds: Reservations driven by personal dissatisfaction, political expediency, or irrelevant factors are unconstitutional. Reservations the re-passed bill under Article 200 are invalid unless the re-passed bill contains wholly new or divergent provisions inconsistent with legislative reconsideration.
- Prolonged inaction: If the Governor exceeds prescribed timelines for decision-making, courts may issue a mandamus to compel action. The Governor may justify delays with sufficient explanations, subject to judicial review.

The Supreme Court outlined the following grounds on which a State Government may challenge the President's decision to withhold assent to a bill reserved by the Governor:

- Withholding assent for bills requiring President's assent: Applies when a bill is reserved because presidential assent is constitutionally required. Judicial review is limited to cases of arbitrariness or mala fide actions, with courts exercising restraint due to the political nature of such decisions.
- Withholding assent over democratic principles: Applies when a bill is reserved due to perceived unconstitutionality threatening representative democracy. Presidential withholding of assent is fully justiciable, as it involves purely legal or constitutional questions. The President is advised to seek this Court's advisory opinion under Article 143 to preempt allegations of bias or arbitrariness.
- Prolonged inaction: Applies if the President fails to decide on a reserved bill within the time limits specified in the judgment. The State Government may seek a writ of mandamus to compel a decision, though the President may justify delays with valid reasons.

== Commentary ==
=== Substantial questions of law ===
Several commentators—including Senior Advocate Shekhar Naphade and Hitesh Jain, Senior Advocate and Vice President of the BJP's Mumbai unit—argued that the two-judge Bench usurped the role of a Constitution Bench by interpreting Articles 200 (the Governor's power to assent to Bills) and 201 (the President's role in reserved Bills), which, they said, involved "substantial questions of law" requiring a five-judge bench under Article 145(3).

Opposing this, advocates Kaleeswaram Raj and P.D.T. Achary maintained that the Court's ruling addressed only procedural clarifications—timelines and mandatory referral routes—rather than substantive constitutional interpretation. V. Venkatesan observed that Attorney General R. Venkataramani, counsel for the Tamil Nadu Governor, did not seek a reference to a larger bench on the grounds that the case involved a "substantial question of law." He also highlighted that in Shrimanth Balasaheb Patil v. Speaker (2019), the Supreme Court held that questions authoritatively settled do not become "substantial" merely by repetition.

== Significance ==
This ruling has been seen as a crucial reaffirmation of the federal structure and parliamentary democracy enshrined in the Indian Constitution. It limits the scope for Governor's obstruction in state affairs and prevents the office of the Governor from being misused for political ends.

== See also ==
- List of landmark court decisions in India
- S. R. Bommai v. Union of India
