= Article 143 of the Constitution of India =

Article 143 of the Constitution of India relates to the power of the President of India to consult the Supreme Court on questions of law or matters of public importance through the advisory jurisdiction conferred upon the court. The President makes a reference based on the advice of the Union council of ministers and it must be heard by a bench of at least five judges. The Court may elect to not provide an opinion and it has no legal binding or precedential value, when provided.

Article 143 of the Indian Constitution is located in Part V (The Union), specifically within Chapter IV which deals with The Union Judiciary.

== Text ==
143. Power of President to consult Supreme Court

(1) If at any time it appears to the President that a question of law or fact has arisen, or is likely to arise, which is of such a nature and of such public importance that it is expedient to obtain the opinion of the Supreme Court upon it, he may refer the question to that Court for consideration and the Court may, after such hearing as it thinks fit, report to the President its opinion thereon.

(2) The President may, notwithstanding anything in the proviso to article 131, refer a dispute of the kind mentioned in the said proviso to the Supreme Court for opinion and the Supreme Court shall, after such hearing as it thinks fit, report to the President its opinion thereon.

== Uses ==
Since 1950, there have been sixteen references made to the Court under this provision. The first reference was made in the Delhi Laws Act case (1951), and most recently in 2025, President Droupadi Murmu referred a set of fourteen legal questions to the Court in the In re: Assent, Withholding or Reservation of Bills by the Governor and the President of India.

== See also ==
- List of presidential references
- Supreme Court of India
