= List of presidential references =

Presidential reference is a question of law or fact of public importance referred to the Supreme Court of India by the President of India under the powers conferred by the Article 143 of the Constitution of India.

Since 1950, there have been sixteen presidential references made under Article 143(1) of the constitution of which two were returned unanswered by the Court.

== Presidential references ==
| # | Year | Case name (In re:) | Key question(s) | Citation (Note: Uses neutral citation, where available) |
|---|---|---|---|---|
| 1 | 1951 | Delhi Laws Act, 1912 | On the power to delegate legislative power to other organs of the state machinery. | 1951 INSC 36 |
| 2 | 1958 | Kerala Education Bill, 1957 | Constitutional validity of a Bill in relation to Articles 29 and 30 of the Constitution. | 1958 INSC 64; 1959 SCR 995 |
| 3 | 1960 | Berubari Union (I) | Whether an Act under Article 3 by Parliament was sufficient to implement a bilateral agreement between India and Pakistan concerning cession of some parts of territory. | 1960 INSC 49; (1960) 3 SCR 250 |
| 4 | 1963 | Sea Customs Act, S. 20(2) | Validity of a draft Bill concerning imposition and authorisation of taxes by the Central Government, and whether it was exempted under Article 289. | 1963 INSC 147; (1964) 3 SCR 787 |
| 5 | 1964 | Powers, Privileges and Immunities of State Legislatures | Questions relating to the validity of initiation of contempt by the State Legislature against High Court judges. | 1964 INSC 203; (1965) 1 SCR 413 |
| 6 | 1974 | Presidential Poll | Interpretation of Articles 56, 62, 70, and 71 with regards to the election of the President. | 10 1974 INSC 123; (1974) 2 SCC 33 |
| 7 | 1978 | Special Courts Bill, 1978 | Consideration of a Bill for constitution of special courts to entertain cases relating to offences committed by individuals holding high political officers, during Emergency. | 1978 INSC 249; (1979) 1 SCC 380 |
| 8 | 1991 | Cauvery Water Disputes Tribunal | Wwhether one party could override implementation of an interim order passed by the Water Dispute Tribunal, by way of an ordinance | 1991 INSC 304; 1993 Supp (1) SCC 96(2) |
| 9 | 1993 | Special Reference No. 1 of 1993 (Ram Janma Bhumi-Babri Masjid matter) | On the factual issue of whether there existed a Hindu temple or Babri Masjid on the disputed land (Note: Reference was returned unanswered) | 1994 INSC 479; (1993) 1 SCC 642 |
| 10 | 1998 | Special Reference No. 1 of 1998 | Issue of appointment o fjudges, and the binding effect of the recommendation of the Chief Justice | 1998 INSC 402; (1998) 7 SCC 739 |
| 11 | 2001 | Jammu and Kashmir Grant of Permit for Resettlement in (or Permanent Return to) the State Bill, 1980 | Relating to return and permanent resettlement of people who left Jammu and Kashmir between 1947-1954 | 2001 SCC OnLine SC 1493 |
| 12 | 2001 | Special Reference No. 1 of 2001 | Validity of a State law regulating use and distribution of natural gas and liquefied petroleum gas, when the subject matter fell within the Union List. | 2004 INSC 209; (2004) 4 SCC 489 |
| 13 | 2002 | Special Reference No. 1 of 2002 (Gujarat Assembly Election matter) | Obligation of the Election Commission to conduct elections, when the state assembly is dissolved in haste and the interplay of Articles 174 and 324, if any | 18 2002 INSC 445; (2002) 8 SCC 237 |
| 14 | 2004 | Punjab Termination of Agreement Act, 2004 | Constitutional validity of the Punjab Termination of Agreement Act which sought to overcome the judicially directed implementation of sharing of natural resources between Punjab, Haryana and Rajasthan, in light of their water dispute | 2016 INSC 1018; (2017) 1 SCC 121 |
| 15 | 2012 | Special Reference No. 1 of 2012 (Natural Resources Allocation) | In relation to the judgment in the 2G spectrum case | 2012 INSC 428; (2012) 10 SCC 1 |
| 16 | 2025 | Assent, Withholding or Reservation of Bills by the Governor and the President of India | On the Court's authority to impose deadlines for the Governor and President under Articles 200 and 201 of the Constitution | 2025 INSC 1333 |
