= Ranjit Singh Sarkaria =

Former Judge of Supreme Court of India (1973-1981)

Hon'ble Justice Ranjit Singh Sarkaria Kaliraman

Chairman of Press Council of India
- In office 19 January 1989 – 23 July 1995
- Appointed by: Central Government of India
- Preceded by: Amarendra Nath Sen
- Succeeded by: P. B. Sawant

Judge of Supreme Court of India
- In office 17 September 1973 – 15 January 1981
- Nominated by: Ajit Nath Ray
- Appointed by: V. V. Giri

Judge of Punjab & Haryana High Court
- In office 13 June 1967 – 16 September 1973
- Nominated by: Kailas Nath Wanchoo
- Appointed by: Zakir Husain

Personal details
- Born: 16 January 1916 Patiala
- Died: 12 October 2007 (aged 91) Chandigarh
- Education: Mohindra College, Government College Lahore (LL.B)

Ranjit Singh Sarkaria Kaliraman (16 January 1916 – 12 October 2007) was an Indian jurist who served as a judge of the Supreme Court of India and the Punjab and Haryana High Court. He is also remembered for chairing the Sarkaria Commission, which examined Centre–State relations, and for his contributions to Punjabi literature and legal terminology.

== Life and career ==
Sarkaria was born on 16 January 1916 in a Sikh Jat Family of Kaliraman Clan, he studied at B. N. Khalsa Polytechnic and Government Mahendra College in Patiala, before graduating from Government College, Lahore, in 1936. He pursued legal studies at University Law College, Lahore, between 1937 and 1939. After completing his education, he practised as a pleader in Patiala and subsequently as an advocate of the Patiala High Court from 1940 to 1943. Sarkaria joined the Patiala Judicial Service as a Sub-Judge-cum-Magistrate on 21 April 1943. He subsequently served in the Patiala and East Punjab States Union (PEPSU) Judicial Service and became a District Judge and Additional District and Sessions Judge, serving first in PEPSU and later in Punjab. Between June 1962 and June 1967, he was on deputation as Registrar of the Punjab High Court.

He was appointed an Additional Judge of the Punjab and Haryana High Court on 13 June 1967 and became permanent on 27 September that year. On 17 September 1973, he was elevated to the Supreme Court of India, where he served until his retirement on 15 January 1981.

== Sarkaria Commission ==
Sarkaria’s most widely recognised contribution came after his retirement. In June 1983, the Union Government constituted the Commission on Centre–State Relations, with him as its chairman. The Commission examined the constitutional and administrative relationship between the Union and the States, including the distribution of powers, legislative and administrative coordination, and the functioning of federal institutions. The Commission submitted its report in 1988, making 247 recommendations intended to improve Centre–State relations while preserving the constitutional framework. One of its important recommendations was the establishment of a permanent Inter-State Council under Article 263 of the Constitution. The Union Government subsequently established the Inter-State Council in 1990. The Commission’s work remains an important reference point in discussions about Indian federalism and cooperative governance.

== Literary and linguistic contributions ==
Beyond judicial service, Sarkaria had a strong interest in languages and literature. He served on a two-member committee established by the PEPSU Government to translate the Constitution of India into Punjabi. He also contributed to legal terminology through his English-Hindi-Punjabi Dictionary of Legal and Administrative Terms, published in 1950. His literary work included Ik Lapp Hussan Di (A Handful of Beauty), published in 1969, which rendered famous English poems into Punjabi verse. In 1973, Punjabi University published his Punjabi translation of Shakespeare’s King Lear. His work thus extended beyond law into the development of Punjabi literary and legal vocabulary.

Sarkaria also served as Chairman of the Press Council of India from 19 January 1989 to 23 January 1992, and again from 24 January 1992 to 23 July 1995.

== Death ==
He died of a prolonged illness on Friday, 12 October 2007, in Chandigarh, India at the age of 91.
