= Article 74 of the Constitution of India =

Provides for a cabinet, a Council of Ministers

Article 74 of the Constitution of the Republic of India provides for a Council of Ministers which shall aid the President in the exercise of the President's functions.

== Text ==
Article 74

(1) There shall be a Council of Ministers with the Prime Minister at the head to aid and advise the President who shall, in the exercise of his functions, act in accordance with such advices. (The bolded text was added in by the Forty-second Amendment of the Constitution of India and came into effect on 3 January 1977.)

Provided that the President may require the Council of Ministers to reconsider such advice, either generally or otherwise, and the President shall act in accordance with the advices tendered after such reconsideration. (This para is added by the Forty-fourth Amendment of the Constitution of India in the year 1978)

(2) The question if any, and if so what, advice was tendered by Ministers to the President shall not be inquired into in any court.

== Amendments ==
Before the 42nd amendment, Article 74(1) stated that, "there shall be a Council of Ministers with the Prime Minister at the head to aid and advise the President in the exercise of his functions". However, there was a slight ambiguity whether the advice of the Council of Ministers is binding on the President. The 42nd Amendment (1976) made it explicit that the President shall, "act in accordance with such advice". The amendment went into effect from 3 January 1977.

The 44th Amendment (1978) however added that the President can send the advice back for reconsideration once. But if the Council of Ministers sends the same advice again to the President then the President must accept it. The amendment went into effect from 20 June 1979.

== Court Cases ==
=== S. R. Bommai v. Union of India (1994) ===
In this case Supreme Court made some very important pronouncements regarding scope and effect of Clause (2) of Article 74. Article 74(2) barred courts from inquiring into the advice given by Council of Ministers to the president. In a way the advice of Council of Ministers was kept out of Supreme Court's power of Judicial Review by this article. In this regard, Supreme Court held that although Article 74(2) bars judicial review so far as the advice given by the Ministers is concerned, it does not bar scrutiny of the material on the basis of which the advice is given. It also said that the material on the basis of which advice was tendered does not become part of the advice and courts are justified in probing as to whether there was any material on the basis of which the advice was given, and whether it was relevant for such advice and the President could have acted on it.

The court also said that, when it undertakes an inquiry into the existence of such material, the prohibition contained in Article 74(2) does not negate their right to know about the factual existence of any such material.

The court also made clear, through para 83 of the judgement, that Article 74(2) gives freedom to the President by making his order unquestionable on the ground that it was either contrary to the advice tendered by the ministers or was issued without obtaining any advice from the ministers. The object of Article 74(2) was only to make the question whether the President had followed the advice of the Ministers or acted contrary thereto, non-justiciable. When the union cabinet is unhappy with the unconstitutional functioning of the President, impeachment by the Parliament is the only recourse since the legal action by the courts is not possible per Article 74 (2) and Article 361.

The impeachment action by parliament is valid only when the charges of violating the constitution by the president are proven by a court or tribunal which is designated by either house of Parliament with a two-thirds majority of its total membership per Article 61. President, need not step down or can approach the Supreme Court for restoring his post as long as he has not violated the constitution (i.e. not obliging the unconstitutional advice of the ministers even after sending back for reconsideration).

== Article 163(3) ==
Article 163(3) is applicable to the Governors of states exactly similar to Article 74(2). When cabinet ministers / meeting minutes are not supporting the advice given to the Governor, he can act in his discretion without violating the constitution.

== See also ==
- Forty-second Amendment of the Constitution of India
