= Article 141 of the Constitution of India =

Article 141 of the Constitution of India lays down that the law declared by the Supreme Court of India "shall be binding on all courts within the territory of India." It provides the constitutional basis for the doctrine of precedent (stare decisis) in the Indian legal system.

Article 141 is located in Part V (The Union) of the Indian Constitution, specifically within Chapter IV which deals with The Union Judiciary.

== Text ==
The law declared by the Supreme Court shall be binding on all courts within the territory of India.

— 141. Law declared by Supreme Court to be binding on all courts

== Scope ==
While the text specifies "all courts," this has been interpreted to mean "all other courts."
