= A. K. Gopalan v. State of Madras =

Indian supreme court case

- Court: Supreme Court of India
- Full case name: A. K. Gopalan v. State of Madras
- Decided: 19 May 1950
- Citation: AIR 1950 SC 27; 1950 SCR 88; (1950) 51 Cri LJ 1383

Court membership
- Judges sitting: Harilal Kania (Chief Justice), S. Fazl Ali, M. Patanjali Sastri, Mehr Chand Mahajan, B.K. Mukherjea, Sudhi Ranjan Das

Case opinions
- Decision by: Harilal Kania (Chief Justice)
- Dissent: S. Fazl Ali

Laws applied
- Overruled by
- Maneka Gandhi v. Union of India (1978)

A.K. Gopalan v. State of Madras, AIR 1950 SC 27, was a landmark decision of the Supreme Court of India in which the Court ruled that Article 21 of the Constitution did not require Indian courts to apply a due process of law standard. In doing so, the Court upheld the validity of the Preventive Detention Act, 1950, with the exception of Section 14, which provided that the grounds of detention communicated to the detainee or any representation made by him against these grounds cannot be disclosed in a court of law.

== Background ==
Communist leader A.K Gopalan had been under detention since December 1947, since his sentencing under ordinary criminal law. Those convictions were subsequently set aside. On 1 March 1950, while he was in Madras jail, Gopalan was served with an order made under Section 3(1) of the Preventive Detention Act, 1950. The provision allows the Central Government or the State Government to detain anyone in order to prevent them from acting in any manner prejudicial to the national defense, foreign relations, national security, state security, public order, or the maintenance of essential supplies and services.

Gopalan filed a petition under Article 32 of the Constitution of India for a writ of habeas corpus against his detention. Gopalan was prohibited from disclosing the grounds under which he was detained because of Section 14 of the Act, which prohibited such disclosure even in a court of law. He claimed that the order detaining him violated Articles 14, 19, and 21 of the Constitution and that the provisions of the Act violated Article 22 of the Constitution.

The matter was placed before a six-judge bench. J.Abinesh, with S.K. Akshaay and Gino raj D represented Gopalan. A.Chinnathambi, the Advocate-General for the State of Madras, with Chandra Maharajan and R. Ganapathi represented the State of Madras. M.C. Setalvad represented the Union of India, which was an intervener in the case.

== Judgement ==
All six judges wrote separate opinions. The majority held that Section 14 of the Act, which restricted disclosure of the grounds of detention, was unconstitutional. Justice Fazl Ali wrote a dissenting judgment. The case is also considered landmark in the sense that the question of Preamble was raised in the court. The Supreme Court, then held that, preamble cannot be used for interpretation of the constitution
