= Maneka Gandhi v. Union of India =

Landmark case in Indian constitutional law

- Court: Supreme Court of India
- Full case name: Maneka Gandhi v. Union of India
- Decided: 1978
- Citations: 1978 2 S.C.R. 621; 1978 INSC 16; AIR 1978 SC 597; (1978) 1 SCC 248

Court membership
- Judges sitting: M. H. Beg (Chief Justice), Y. V. Chandrachud, V. R. Krishna Iyer, P. N. Bhagwati, N. L. Untwalia, S. Murtaza Fazal Ali, P. S. Kailasam

Case opinions
- Decision by: P. N. Bhagwati (for himself, N. L. Untwalia, and S. Murtaza Fazal Ali)
- Concurrence: M. H. Beg (Chief Justice), Y. V. Chandrachud, V. R. Krishna Iyer
- Dissent: P. S. Kailasam

Laws applied
- This case overturned a previous ruling
- A. K. Gopalan v. State of Madras

Maneka Gandhi v. Union of India, AIR 1978 SC 597, was a landmark decision of the Supreme Court of India that significantly expanded the interpretation of Article 21 of the Constitution of India. The Court overruled A. K. Gopalan v. State of Madras which had held that fundamental rights were exclusive and independent of each other. Instead, the Court established that Articles 14, 19, and 21 were interlinked, forming what is known as the 'golden triangle' of the Constitution. It held that any law depriving a person of "personal liberty" must satisfy all three provisions.

The Court further ruled that the 'procedure established by law' under Article 21 must be just, fair, and reasonable, rejecting earlier interpretations that allowed arbitrary or oppressive state action. This decision marked a fundamental shift in Indian constitutional law, prioritizing individual rights over a restrictive reading of state power and underlining the importance of 'due process of law'.

Legal scholars have described the ruling as a turning point in Indian jurisprudence, signaling a move away from formalistic interpretations and toward a more rights-expanding approach. As one scholar noted, Maneka Gandhi marked the moment when the Supreme Court "inaugurated a new path where Courts would expand the rights of individuals against the State, instead of limiting or contracting them."

== Background ==
Maneka Gandhi's passport was impounded "in the public interest" by an order dated 2 July 1977. When she requested reasons for the impoundment, the Government of India declined to provide any, citing "the interests of the general public."

Gandhi filed a written petition under Article 32 of the Constitution of India, challenging the order on the grounds that it violated her fundamental rights under Articles 14, 19, and 21. In its written submission, the Union government stated that her passport was impounded because her presence in India was likely to be required in connection with legal proceedings before a Commission of Inquiry.

== Judgement ==
Justice P. N. Bhagwati delivered the judgment for a plurality of the Court, writing for himself, along with Justices Untwalia and Fazal Ali. Chief Justice Beg, Justice Chandrachud, and Justice Krishna Iyer wrote separate concurring judgments.

Justice Kailasam wrote a dissenting opinion.

The Court did not pass an order on the specific matter of Maneka Gandhi's passport, stating that "[i]n view of the statement made by the Attorney-General that the Government is agreeable to consider any representation that may be made by the petitioner in respect of the impounding of her passport... it is not necessary to formally interfere with the impugned order..."
