= Article 142 of the Constitution of India =

Article 142 of the Constitution of India empowers the Supreme Court of India with broad inherent powers to pass orders and decrees necessary to secure complete justice.

== Text ==
142. Enforcement of decrees and orders of Supreme Court and orders as to discovery, etc

(1) The Supreme Court in the exercise of its jurisdiction may pass such decree or make such order as is necessary for doing complete justice in any cause or matter pending before it, and any decree so passed or order so made shall be enforceable throughout the territory of India in such manner as may be prescribed by or under any law made by Parliament and, until provision in that behalf is so made, in such manner as the President may by order prescribe.

(2) Subject to the provisions of any law made in this behalf by Parliament, the Supreme Court shall, as respects the whole of the territory of India, have all and every power to make any order for the purpose of securing the attendance of any person, the discovery or production of any documents, or the investigation or punishment of any contempt of itself.

== Uses ==
In 2026, Supreme Court of India agreed to exercise its powers under the Article 142 to quash First Information Reports (FIRs) filed against unnamed students over the nationwide protests due to 2026 NEET scandal.
