= Sarkaria Commission =

1983 Indian central government commission

Sarkaria Commission was set up in June 1983 by the central government of India. Its charter was to examine the relationship and balance of power between state and central governments in the country and suggest changes within the framework of Constitution of India. The Commission was so named as it was headed by Ranjit Singh Sarkaria, a retired judge of the Supreme Court of India.

The Commission submitted its final 1600-page report in 1988; it contained 247 specific recommendations. In spite of the large size of its report - the Commission recommended, by and large, status quo in the Centre-State relations, especially in the areas relating to legislative matters, the role of Governors and use of Article 356 (suspension of state government and imposition of direct Union government rule in a state).

It is widely accepted that to whatever extent the Commissions suggested change, the recommendations were not implemented by the government.
