= President of India =

Head of state

President of the Republic of India
- Bhārata Gaṇarājya kē Rāṣṭrapati
- Emblem of The Republic of India

- Flag of India

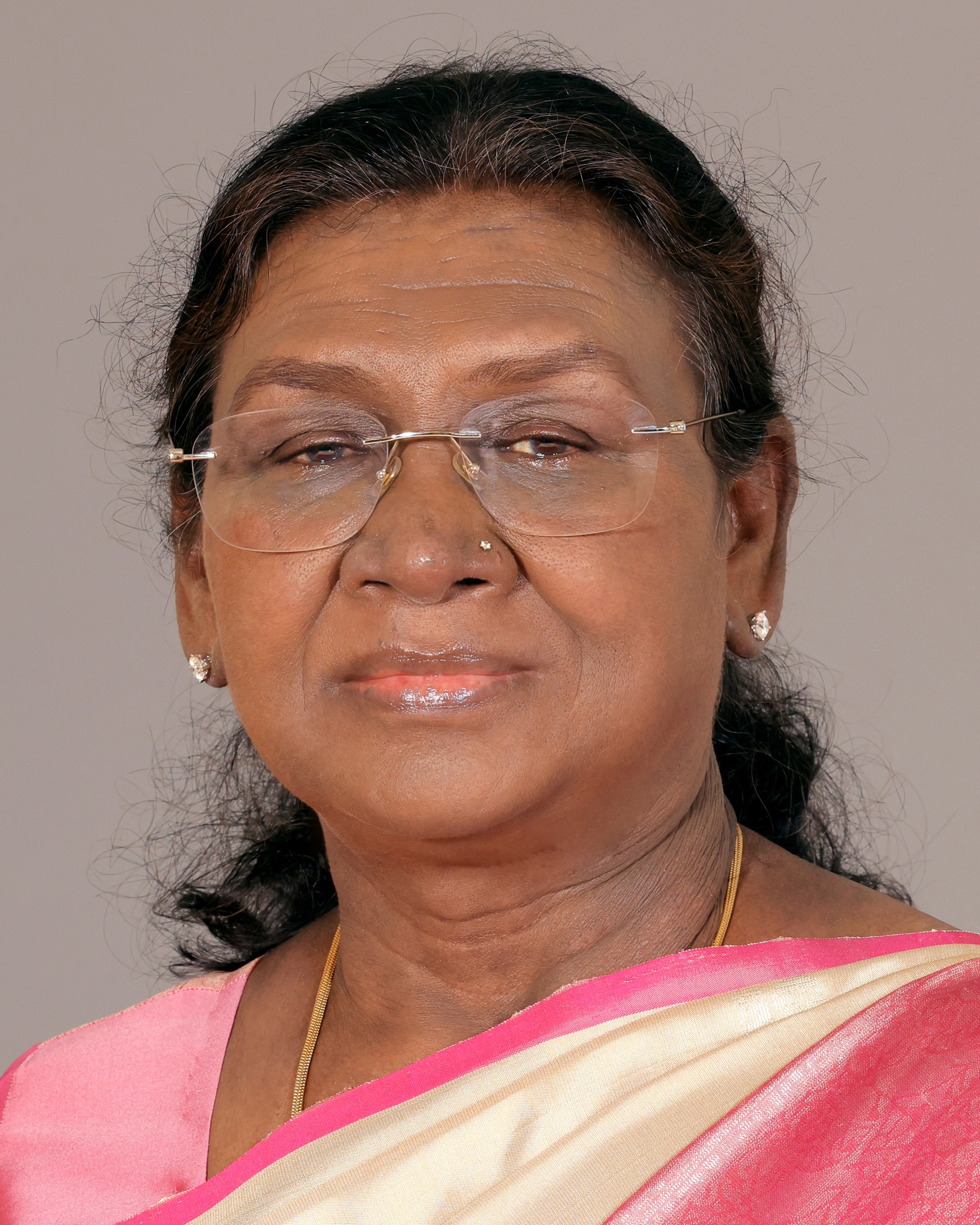
- Incumbent; Droupadi Murmu since 25 July 2022
- Head of state of the Republic of India; Executive branch of the Union Government
- Style: Hon'ble President (within India); Her Excellency (outside India); The Honourable (within the Commonwealth)
- Type: Head of state; Supreme commander-in-chief
- Abbreviation: POI
- Residence: Rashtrapati Bhavan
- Seat: New Delhi
- Appointer: Electoral College of India
- Term length: Five years; no restriction on renewal
- Constituting instrument: Article 52 of the Constitution of India (1950)
- Precursor: Monarch of India and his representative the Governor-General of India
- Formation: 26 January 1950; 76 years ago
- First holder: Rajendra Prasad
- Deputy: Vice President of India
- Salary: ₹500,000 (US$5,300) per month ₹6,000,000 (US$64,000) per year
- Website: presidentofindia.gov.in

The president of India (ISO: Bhārata kē Rāṣṭrapati) is the head of state of the Republic of India. The president is the nominal head of the executive, (Note: The president is the head of the executive per Article 53 and 77 of the Constitution. However, in practice, it is the Council of Ministers with the prime minister as its head that exercises the powers accorded to this position per Article 74 and 78 of the Constitution, thus making the prime minister the de facto head of the executive.) the first citizen of the country, and the supreme commander of the Indian Armed Forces. Droupadi Murmu is the 15th and current president, having taken office on 25 July 2022.

The office of president was created when India's constitution came into force and it became a republic on 26 January 1950. The president is indirectly elected by an electoral college comprising both houses of the Parliament of India and the legislative assemblies of each of India's states and territories, who themselves are all directly elected by the citizens.

The President ranks 1st in the Order of Precedence of India as per Article 53 of the Constitution of India states that the president can exercise their powers directly or by subordinate authority, though all of the executive powers vested in the president are, in practice, exercised by the prime minister heading the Council of Ministers. The president is bound by the constitution to act on the advice of the council and to enforce the decrees passed by the Supreme Court under article 142.

== Origin ==
India achieved independence from the British on 15 August 1947, initially as a dominion within the Commonwealth of Nations with George VI as king, represented in the country by a governor-general. Following independence, the Constituent Assembly of India, under the leadership of B. R. Ambedkar, undertook the process of drafting a completely new constitution for the country. The Constitution of India was eventually enacted on 26 November 1949 and came into force on 26 January 1950, making India a republic. The offices of monarch and governor-general were replaced by the new office of President of India, with Rajendra Prasad as its first incumbent. India retained its Commonwealth membership per the London Declaration, recognising the King as "the symbol of the free association of its independent member nations and as such the Head of the Commonwealth."

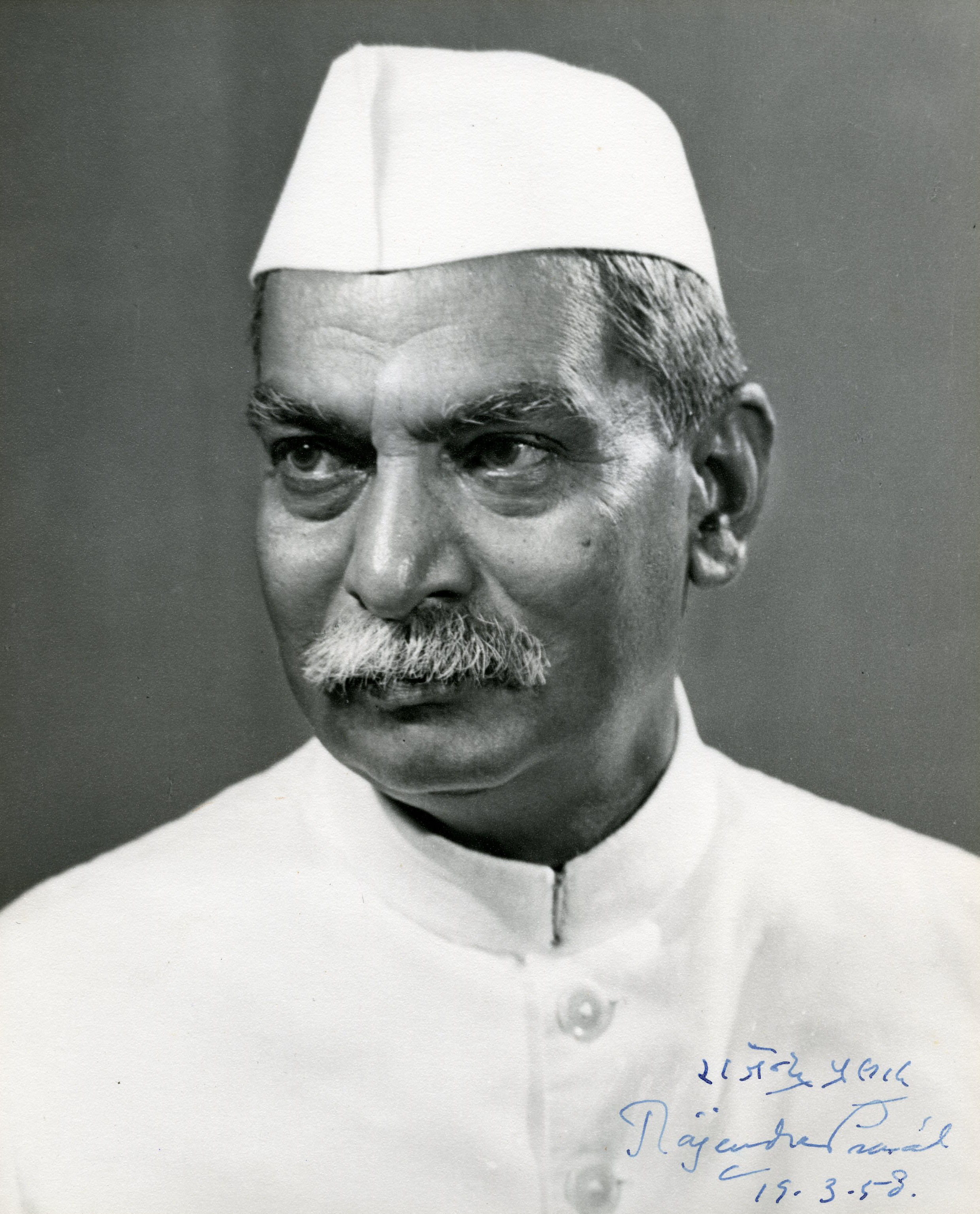
Rajendra Prasad, the first President of India

The Indian constitution accords to the president the responsibility and authority to defend and protect the Constitution of India and its rule of law. Invariably, any action taken by the executive or legislature entities of the constitution shall become law only after the president's assent. The president shall not accept any actions of the executive or legislature which are unconstitutional. The president is the foremost, most empowered and prompt defender of the constitution (Article 60), who has pre-emptive power for ensuring constitutionality in the actions of the executive or legislature. The role of the judiciary in upholding the Constitution of India is the second line of defence in nullifying any unconstitutional actions of the executive and legislative entities of the Indian Union.

== Powers and duties ==
Under the draft constitution the President occupies the same position as the King under the English Constitution. He is the head of the state but not of the Executive. He represents the Nation but does not rule the Nation. He is the symbol of the Nation. His place in the administration is that of a ceremonial device on a seal by which the nation's decisions are made known.

— Bhimrao Ambedkar, as chairman of the drafting committee of the Constituent Assembly of India during various debates about the president being constitutional head of the state.

=== Duty ===
The primary duty of the president is to preserve, protect and defend the constitution and the law of India as made part of their oath (Article 60 of Indian constitution). The president is the common head of all independent constitutional entities. All their actions, recommendations (Article 3, Article 111, Article 274, etc.) and supervisory powers (Article 74(2), Article 78C, Article 108, Article 111, etc.) over the executive and legislative entities of India shall be used in accordance to uphold the constitution. There is no bar on the actions of the president to contest in the court of law.

=== Legislative powers ===
Legislative power is constitutionally vested in the Parliament of India of which the president is the head, to facilitate the lawmaking process per the constitution (Article 78, Article 86, etc.). The president summons both the houses (Lok Sabha and Rajya Sabha) of the parliament and prorogues them. They can dissolve the Lok Sabha.

The president inaugurates parliament by addressing it after the general elections and also at the beginning of the first session every year per Article 87(1). The presidential address on these occasions is generally meant to outline the new policies of the government.

All bills passed by the parliament can become laws only after receiving the assent of the president per Article 111. After a bill is presented to them, the president shall declare either that they assent to the Bill, or that they withhold assent from it. As a third option, they can return a bill to parliament, if it is not a money bill, for reconsideration. President may be of the view that a particular bill passed under the legislative powers of parliament is violating the constitution, they can send back the bill with their recommendation to pass the bill under the constituent powers of parliament following the Article 368 procedure. When, after reconsideration, the bill is passed accordingly and presented to the president, with or without amendments, the president cannot withhold their assent from it. The president can also withhold their assent to a bill when it is initially presented to them (rather than return it to parliament) thereby exercising a pocket veto on the advice of the prime minister or council of ministers per Article 74 if it is inconsistent with the constitution. Article 143 gives the president the power to consult the supreme court about the constitutional validity of an issue. The president shall assent to constitutional amendment bills without power to withhold the bills per Article 368 (2).

When either of the two Houses of the Parliament of India is not in session, and if the government feels the need for an immediate procedure, the president can promulgate ordinances that have the same force and effect as an act passed by parliament under its legislative powers. These are in the nature of interim or temporary legislation and their continuance is subject to parliamentary approval. Ordinances remain valid for no more than six weeks from the date the parliament is convened unless approved by it earlier. Under Article 123, the president as the upholder of the constitution shall be satisfied that immediate action is mandatory as advised by the union cabinet and they are confident that the government commands majority support in the parliament needed for the passing of the ordinance into an act and parliament can be summoned to deliberate on the passing of the ordinance as soon as possible. The promulgated ordinance is treated as an act of parliament when in force and it is the responsibility of the president to withdraw the ordinance as soon as the reasons for the promulgation of the ordinance are no longer applicable. Bringing laws in the form of ordinances has become a routine matter by the government and president, but the provisions made in Article 123 are meant for mitigating unusual circumstances where immediate action is inevitable when the extant provisions of the law are inadequate. Re-promulgation of an ordinance after failing to get approval within the stipulated time of both houses of parliament is an unconstitutional act by the president. The president should not incorporate any matter in an ordinance which violates the constitution or requires an amendment to the constitution. The president should take moral responsibility when an ordinance elapses automatically or is not approved by the parliament or violates the constitution. Thus, it is believed that the POI is the de jure head of the state, whereas PM is the de facto head.

=== Executive powers ===
The President of the Indian Union will be generally bound by the advice of his Ministers. ... He can do nothing contrary to their advice nor can do anything without their advice. The President of the United States can dismiss any Secretary at any time. The President of the Indian Union has no power to do so, so long as his Ministers command a majority in Parliament

— Bhimrao Ambedkar, chairperson of the drafting committee of the Constituent Assembly of India

Presidential Standard of India (1950–1971)

As per Article 53, the executive power of the country is vested in the president and is exercised by the president either directly or through officers subordinate to him in accordance with the constitution. When parliament thinks fit it may accord additional executive powers to the president per Article 70 which may be further delegated by the president to the governors of states per Article 160. Union cabinet with prime minister as its head, should aid and advise the president in performing their functions. Per Article 74 (2), the council of ministers or prime minister are not accountable legally to the advice tendered to the president but it is the sole responsibility of the president to ensure compliance with the constitution in performing their duties. President or their subordinate officers is bound by the provisions of the constitution notwithstanding any advice by the union cabinet.

As per Article 142, it is the duty of the president to enforce the decrees of the supreme court.

=== Judicial powers ===
The primary duty of the president is to preserve, protect and defend the constitution and the law of India per Article 60. The president appoints the chief justice of India and other judges on the advice of the chief justice. The president may dismiss a judge with a two-thirds vote of the two Houses of the parliament.

The Indian government's chief legal adviser, the attorney-general for India, is appointed by the president of India under Article 76(1) and holds office during the pleasure of the president. If the president considers a question of law or a matter of public importance has arisen, they can also ask for the advisory opinion of the supreme court per Article 143. Per Article 88, the president can ask the attorney general to attend the parliamentary proceedings and report to him any unlawful functioning if any.

=== Appointment powers ===
The president appoints as prime minister the person most likely to command the support of the majority in the Lok Sabha (usually the leader of the majority party or coalition). The president then appoints the other members of the Council of Ministers, distributing portfolios to them on the advice of the prime minister. The Council of Ministers remains in power at the 'pleasure' of the president.

The president appoints 12 members of the Rajya Sabha from amongst persons who have special knowledge or practical experience in respect of such matters as literature, science, art and social service. The president may nominate not more than two members of Anglo Indian community as Lok Sabha members per Article 331, which was removed in 2019.

Governors of states are also appointed by the president who shall work at the pleasure of the president. Per Article 156, the president is empowered to dismiss a governor who has violated the constitution in their acts.

The president is responsible for making a wide variety of appointments. These include:

- The Chief Justice of India and other judges of the Supreme Court of India and state/union territory high courts.
- The Chief Minister of the National Capital Territory of Delhi (Article 239 AA 5 of the constitution).
- The Comptroller and Auditor General Of India.
- The Chief Election Commissioner and other Election Commissioners.
- The chairman and other members of the Union Public Service Commission.
- The Attorney General Of India.
- Ambassadors and High Commissioners to other countries (only through the list of names given by the prime minister).
- Officers of the All India Services (IAS, IPS and IFoS), and other Central Civil Services in Group 'A'.

=== Financial powers ===
- A financial bill can be introduced in the parliament only with the president's recommendation.
- The president lays the Annual Financial Statement, i.e. the Union budget, before the parliament.
- The president can take advances out of the Contingency Fund of India to meet unforeseen expenses.
- The president constitutes a Finance Commission every five years to recommend the distribution of the taxes between the centre and the States. The most recent was constituted in 2017.

=== Diplomatic powers ===
All international treaties and agreements are negotiated and concluded on behalf of the president. However, in practice, such negotiations are usually carried out by the prime minister along with their Cabinet (especially the Minister of External Affairs). Also, such treaties are subject to the approval of the parliament. The president represents India in international forums and affairs where such a function is chiefly ceremonial. The president may also send and receive diplomats, i.e. the officers from the Indian Foreign Service. The president is the first citizen of the country.

=== Military powers ===
The president is the supreme commander of the Indian Armed Forces. Only the president can declare war or conclude peace, on the advice of the Union Council of Ministers headed by the prime minister. All important treaties and contracts are made in the president's name.

=== Pardoning powers ===
As mentioned in Article 72 of the Indian constitution, the president is empowered with the powers to grant pardons in the following situations:

- punishment for an offence against Union law
- punishment by a military court
- a death sentence

The decisions involving pardoning and other rights by the president are independent of the opinion of the prime minister or the Lok Sabha majority. In most cases, however, the president exercises their executive powers on the advice of the prime minister and the cabinet.

=== Emergency powers ===
The president can declare three types of emergencies: national, state and financial, under articles 352, 356 & 360 in addition to promulgating ordinances under article 123.

==== National emergency ====
A national emergency can be declared in the whole of India or a part of its territory for causes of war or armed rebellion or an external aggression. Such an emergency was declared in India in 1962 (Indo-China war), 1971 (Indo-Pakistan war), and 1975 to 1977 (declared by Indira Gandhi).^{[see main]}

Under Article 352 of the India constitution, the president can declare such an emergency only on the basis of a written request by the cabinet of ministers headed by the prime minister. Such a proclamation must be approved by the parliament with at least a two-thirds majority within one month. Such an emergency can be imposed for six months. It can be extended by six months by repeated parliamentary approval-there is no maximum duration.

In such an emergency, Fundamental Rights of Indian citizens can be suspended. The six freedoms under Right to Freedom are automatically suspended. However, the Right to Life and Personal Liberty cannot be suspended (Article 21).

The president can make laws on the 66 subjects of the State List (which contains subjects on which the state governments can make laws). Also, all money bills are referred to the president for approval. The term of the Lok Sabha can be extended by a period of up to one year, but not so as to extend the term of parliament beyond six months after the end of the declared emergency.

National Emergency has been proclaimed 3 times in India to date. It was declared first in 1962 by President Sarvepalli Radhakrishnan, during the Sino-Indian War. This emergency lasted through the Indo-Pakistani War of 1965 and up to 1968. It was revoked in 1968. The second emergency in India was proclaimed in 1971 by President V. V. Giri on the eve of the Indo-Pakistani War of 1971. The first two emergencies were in the face of external aggression and war. They were hence external emergencies. Even as the second emergency was in progress, another internal emergency was proclaimed by President Fakhruddin Ali Ahmed, with Indira Gandhi as prime minister in 1975. In 1977, the second and the third emergencies were together revoked.

==== State emergency ====
If the president is not fully satisfied, on the basis of the report of the governor of the concerned state or from other sources, that the governance in a state cannot be carried out according to the provisions in the constitution, they can proclaim under Article 356 a state of emergency in the state. Such an emergency must be approved by the parliament within a period of 2 months.

Under Article 356 of the Indian constitution, it can be imposed from six months to a maximum period of three years with repeated parliamentary approval every six months. If the emergency needs to be extended for more than three years, this can be achieved by a constitutional amendment, as has happened in Punjab and Jammu and Kashmir.

During such an emergency, the president can take over the entire work of the executive, and the governor administers the state in the name of the president. The Legislative Assembly can be dissolved or may remain in suspended animation. The parliament makes laws on the 66 subjects of the state list (see National emergency for explanation).

A State Emergency can be imposed via the following:

1. By Article 356 – If that state failed to run constitutionally, i.e. constitutional machinery has failed. When a state emergency is imposed under this provision, the state is said to be under "President's rule.
2. By Article 365 – If that state is not working according to the direction of the Union government issued per the provisions of the constitution.

This type of emergency needs the approval of the parliament within 2 months. It can last up to a maximum of three years via extensions after each 6-month period. However, after one year it can be extended only if

1. A state of National Emergency has been declared in the country or the particular state.
2. The Election Commission finds it difficult to organise an election in that state.

The Sarkaria Commission held that presidents have unconstitutionally misused the provision of Article 356 many times for achieving political motives, by dismissing the state governments although there was no constitutional break down in the states. During 2005, President's rule was imposed in Bihar state, misusing Article 356 unconstitutionally to prevent the democratically elected state legislators to form a government after the state elections.

There is no provision in the constitution to re-promulgate president's rule in a state when the earlier promulgation ceased to operate for want of parliaments approval within two months duration. During 2014 in Andhra Pradesh, president's rule was first imposed on 1 March 2014 and it ceased to operate on 30 April 2014. President's rule was promulgated after being fully aware that the earliest parliament session is feasible at the end of May 2014 after the general elections. It was reimposed again unconstitutionally on 28 April 2014 by the president.

==== Financial emergency ====
Article 282 accords financial autonomy in spending the financial resources available with the states for public purposes. Article 293 gives liberty to states to borrow without any limit to its ability for its requirements within the territory of India without any consent from the Union government. However, the Union government can insist on compliance with its loan terms when a state has an outstanding loan charged to the consolidated fund of India or an outstanding loan in respect of which a guarantee has been given by the Government of India under the liability of consolidated fund of India.

Under article 360 of the constitution, the president can proclaim a financial emergency when the financial stability or credit of the nation or any part of its territory is threatened. However, until now no guidelines defining the situation of financial emergency in the entire country or a state or union territory or a panchayat or a municipality or a corporation have been framed either by the finance commission or by the central government.

Such an emergency must be approved by the parliament within two months by a simple majority. It has never been declared. A state of financial emergency remains in force indefinitely until revoked by the president.

The president can reduce the salaries of all government officials, including judges of the supreme court and high courts, in cases of a financial emergency. All money bills passed by state legislatures are submitted to the president for approval. They can direct the state to observe certain principles (economy measures) relating to financial matters.

== Selection process ==
=== Eligibility ===
Article 58 of the constitution sets the principal qualifications one must meet to be eligible to the office of the president. A president must be:

- a citizen of India
- of 35 years of age or above
- qualified to become a member of the Lok Sabha

A person shall not be eligible for election as president if they hold any office of profit under the Government of India or the Government of any State or any local or other authority subject to the control of any of the said Governments.

Certain office-holders, however, are permitted to stand as presidential candidates. These are:

- The current vice president
- The governor of any state
- A Minister of the Union or of any state (including prime minister and chief ministers)

In the event that the vice president, a state governor or a minister is elected president, they are considered to have vacated their previous office on the date they begin serving as president.

A member of parliament or a state legislature can seek election to the office of the president but if they are elected as president, they shall be deemed to have vacated their seat in parliament or a state legislature on the date on which they enter upon their office as president [Article 59(1)].

Article 57 provides that a person who holds, or who has held, office as president shall, subject to the other provisions of this constitution, be eligible for re-election to that office.

Under the Presidential and Vice-Presidential Elections Act, 1952, a candidate to be nominated for the office of president needs 50 electors as proposers and 50 electors as seconders for their name to appear on the ballot.

Additionally, the candidate is required to deposit a security amount (currently ₹15,000), which is forfeited if the candidate fails to secure a specified number of votes.

=== Electoral college ===
The president is elected indirectly by an electoral college consisting of elected members of both houses of parliament and elected members of the legislative assemblies of states and union territories of Delhi and Puducherry.

Nominated members of parliament and state legislatures, as well as members of legislative councils, are not part of the electoral college.

=== Voting system ===
The election is conducted in accordance with the system of proportional representation by means of the single transferable vote, and voting is by secret ballot.

The value of votes is weighted to ensure parity between the states and the Union. The value of the vote of a member of a state legislative assembly is determined based on the population of the state, while the value of the vote of a member of parliament is calculated so as to maintain balance between the total value of votes of MPs and MLAs.

=== Counting of votes ===
The counting of votes is carried out by the Election Commission of India. To be declared elected, a candidate must secure more than half of the total valid votes polled. If no candidate achieves the required quota in the first count, the candidate with the lowest votes is eliminated and their votes are transferred based on subsequent preferences until a candidate secures the required majority.

== Time of election ==
Article 56(1) of the constitution provides that the president shall hold office for a term of five years, from the date on which they enter their office. According to Article 62, an election to fill a vacancy caused by the expiration of the term of office of President shall be completed before the expiration of the term. An election to fill a vacancy in the office of President occurring by reason of their death, resignation or removal, or otherwise shall be held as soon as possible after, and in no case later than six months from, the date of occurrence of the vacancy; and the person elected to fill the vacancy shall, subject to the provisions of Article 56, be entitled to hold office for the full term of five years from the date on which they enter their office.

To meet the contingency of an election to the office of President not being completed in time due to unforeseen circumstances like countermanding of an election due to death of a candidate or on account of the postponement of the poll for any valid reason, Article 56(1)(c) provides that the president shall, notwithstanding the expiration of their term, continue to hold office until their successor enters into office.

=== Conditions for the presidency ===
Certain conditions, per Article 59 of the Indian constitution, debar an otherwise eligible citizen from contesting the presidential elections. The conditions are:

- The president shall not be a member of either house of the parliament or a house of the legislature of any state, and if a member of either house of the parliament or a house of the legislature of any state is elected president, they shall be deemed to have vacated their seat in that house on the date on which they enter into office as president.
- The president shall not hold any other office of profit.
- The president shall be entitled without payment of rent to the use of their official residences and shall be also entitled to such emoluments, allowances and privileges as may be determined by parliament by law and until provision in that behalf is so made, such emoluments, allowances and privileges as are specified in the Second Schedule.
- The emoluments and allowances of the president shall not be diminished during their term of office.

=== Election process ===
Whenever the office becomes vacant, the new president is chosen by an electoral college consisting of the elected members of both houses of parliament (MPs), the elected members of the State Legislative Assemblies (Vidhan Sabha) of all States and the elected members of the legislative assemblies (MLAs) of union territories with legislatures, i.e., National Capital Territory (NCT) of Delhi, Jammu and Kashmir and Puducherry. The election process of the president is a more extensive process than of the prime minister who is also elected indirectly (elected by the members of the majority party (or union) in the Lok Sabha). Whereas President being the constitutional head with duties to protect, defend and preserve the constitution and rule of law in a constitutional democracy with constitutional supremacy, is elected in an extensive manner by the members of Lok Sabha, Rajya Sabha and state legislative assemblies in a secret ballot procedure.

The nomination of a candidate for election to the office of the president must be subscribed by at least 50 electors as proposers and 50 electors as seconders. Each candidate has to make a security deposit of ₹15,000 (US$160) in the Reserve Bank of India. The security deposit is liable to be forfeited in case the candidate fails to secure one-sixth of the votes polled.

The election is held by means of the instant-runoff voting (IRV) method. The voting takes place by a secret ballot system. The manner of election of President is provided by Article 55 of the constitution.

Each elector casts a different number of votes. The general principle is that the total number of votes cast by Members of parliament equals the total number of votes cast by State Legislators. Also, legislators from larger states cast more votes than those from smaller states. Finally, the number of legislators in state matters; if a state has few legislators, then each legislator has more votes; if a state has many legislators, then each legislator has fewer votes.

The actual calculation for votes cast by a particular state is calculated by dividing the state's population by 1000, which is divided again by the number of legislators from the State voting in the electoral college. This number is the number of votes per legislator in a given state. Every elected member of the parliament enjoys the same number of votes, which may be obtained by dividing the total number of votes assigned to the members of legislative assemblies by the total number of elected representatives of the parliament.

Although Indian presidential elections involve actual voting by MPs and MLAs, they tend to vote for the candidate supported by their respective parties.

=== Oath or affirmation ===
The president is required to make and subscribe in the presence of the chief justice of India—or in their absence, the senior-most judge of the supreme court—an oath or affirmation to protect, preserve and defend the constitution as follows:

I, (name), do swear in the name of God (or solemnly affirm) that I will faithfully execute the office of President (or discharge the functions of the President) of the Republic of India, and will to the best of my ability preserve, protect and defend the Constitution and the law, and that I will devote myself to the service and well-being of the people of the Republic of India.

— Article 60, Constitution of India

== List ==
This list is numbered based on presidents elected after winning an Indian presidential election. The terms of V. V. Giri, Mohammad Hidayatullah and B. D. Jatti, who served as acting president, are therefore not numbered or counted as actual terms in office. The president of India does not represent any political party.

Legend

Indian National Congress (INC) (8)
Janata Party (JP) (1)
Bharatiya Janata Party (BJP) (2)
Independent (IND) (4)
Acting President (3)

Key

- ^{RES} Resigned
- ^{†} Assassinated or died in office

Portrait	Name	Term of office			Election	Vice president	Party
Rajendra Prasad	Rajendra Prasad	26 January 1950	13 May 1962	12 years, 107 days	1952	Sarvepalli Radhakrishnan	Indian National Congress
Rajendra Prasad	Rajendra Prasad	26 January 1950	13 May 1962	12 years, 107 days	1957	Sarvepalli Radhakrishnan	Indian National Congress
Sarvepalli Radhakrishnan	Sarvepalli Radhakrishnan	13 May 1962	13 May 1967	5 years, 0 days	1962	Zakir Husain	Independent
	Zakir Husain^{†}	13 May 1967	3 May 1969	1 year, 355 days	1967	V. V. Giri	Independent
	V. V. Giri	3 May 1969	20 July 1969	78 days	–		
	Mohammad Hidayatullah	20 July 1969	24 August 1969	35 days	–		
	V. V. Giri	24 August 1969	24 August 1974	5 years, 0 days	1969	Gopal Swarup Pathak	Independent
	Fakhruddin Ali Ahmed^{†}	24 August 1974	11 February 1977	2 years, 171 days	1974	Gopal Swarup Pathak B. D. Jatti	Indian National Congress (R)
	B. D. Jatti	11 February 1977	25 July 1977	164 days	–		
	Neelam Sanjiva Reddy	25 July 1977	25 July 1982	5 years, 0 days	1977	B. D. Jatti Mohammad Hidayatullah	Janata Party
	Zail Singh	25 July 1982	25 July 1987	5 years, 0 days	1982	Mohammad Hidayatullah Ramaswamy Venkataraman	Indian National Congress (I)
	Ramaswamy Venkataraman	25 July 1987	25 July 1992	5 years, 0 days	1987	Shankar Dayal Sharma	Indian National Congress (I)
Shankar Dayal Sharma	Shankar Dayal Sharma	25 July 1992	25 July 1997	5 years, 0 days	1992	K. R. Narayanan	Indian National Congress (I)
	K. R. Narayanan	25 July 1997	25 July 2002	5 years, 0 days	1997	Krishan Kant	Indian National Congress (I)
Avul Pakir Jainulabdeen Abdul Kalam	A. P. J. Abdul Kalam	25 July 2002	25 July 2007	5 years, 0 days	2002	Krishan Kant Bhairon Singh Shekhawat	Independent
	Pratibha Patil	25 July 2007	25 July 2012	5 years, 0 days	2007	Hamid Ansari	Indian National Congress
	Pranab Mukherjee	25 July 2012	25 July 2017	5 years, 0 days	2012	Hamid Ansari	Indian National Congress
	Ram Nath Kovind	25 July 2017	25 July 2022	5 years, 0 days	2017	Hamid Ansari Venkaiah Naidu	Bharatiya Janata Party
	Droupadi Murmu	25 July 2022	Incumbent	4 years, 119 days	2022	Venkaiah Naidu Jagdeep Dhankhar C. P. Radhakrishnan	Bharatiya Janata Party

== Emoluments ==
Presidential pay
Date updated	Salary (per month)
1 February 2018	₹5 lakh (US$5,300)

The president of India used to receive ₹10,000 (US$100) per month per the Second Schedule of the constitution. This amount was increased to ₹50,000 (equivalent to ₹250,000 or US$2,600 in 2026) in 1998. On 11 September 2008, the Government of India increased the salary of the president to ₹1.5 lakh (equivalent to ₹4.6 lakh or US$4,900 in 2026). This amount was further increased to ₹5 lakh (equivalent to ₹7.3 lakh or US$7,800 in 2026) in the 2018 Union budget of India. However, almost everything that the president does or wants to do is taken care of by an annual ₹225 million (equivalent to ₹680 million or US$7.3 million in 2026) budget that the Government allots for their upkeep. Rashtrapati Bhavan, the president's official residence, is the largest presidential palace in the world. The Rashtrapati Nilayam at Bolarum, Hyderabad and Retreat Building at Chharabra, Shimla are the official Retreat Residences of the president of India. The official state car of the president is a custom-built heavily armored Mercedes Benz S600 (W221) Pullman Guard.

The former presidents and widows and widowers of presidents are eligible for pension, furnished accommodation, security, various allowances, etc.

Presidential amenities

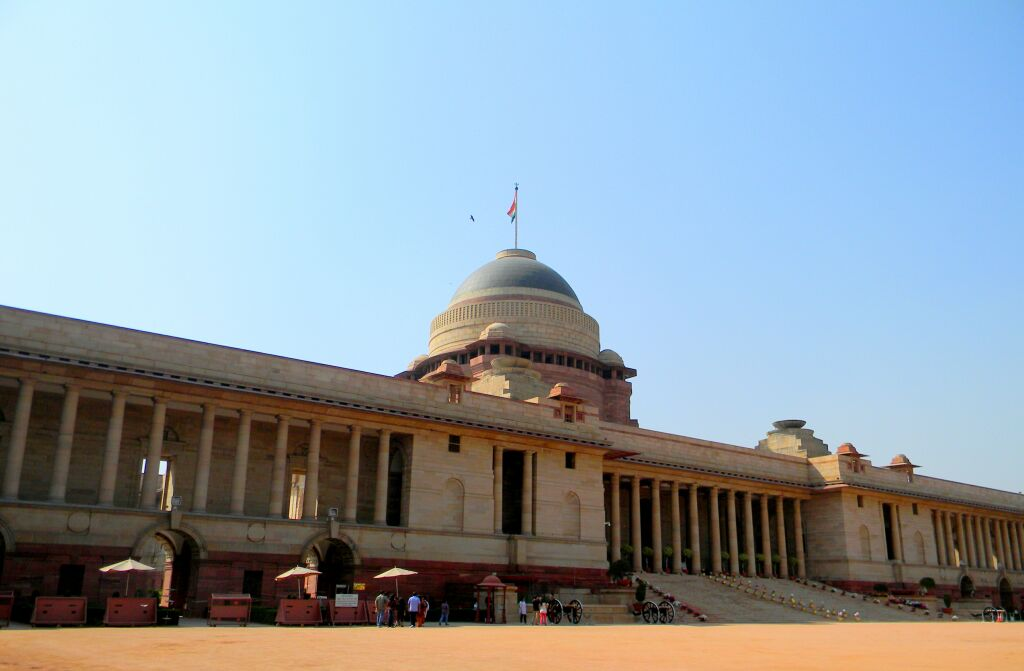
Rashtrapati Bhavan, the official residence of the president, located in New Delhi

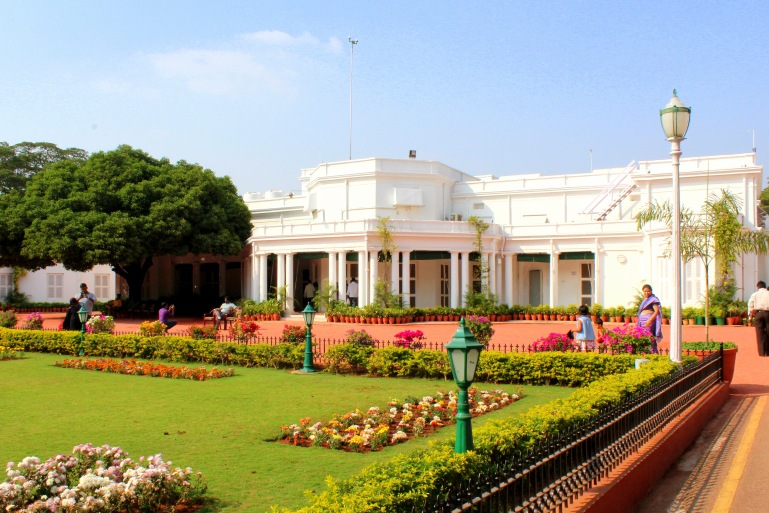
Rashtrapati Nilayam is the official retreat of the president located in Hyderabad.

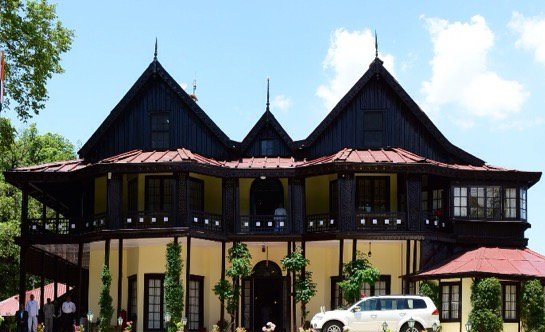
The Retreat Building is the official summer retreat of the president located in Shimla.

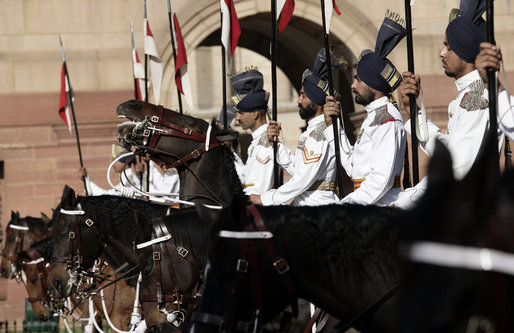
The President's Bodyguards is an elite household cavalry regiment of the Indian Army.

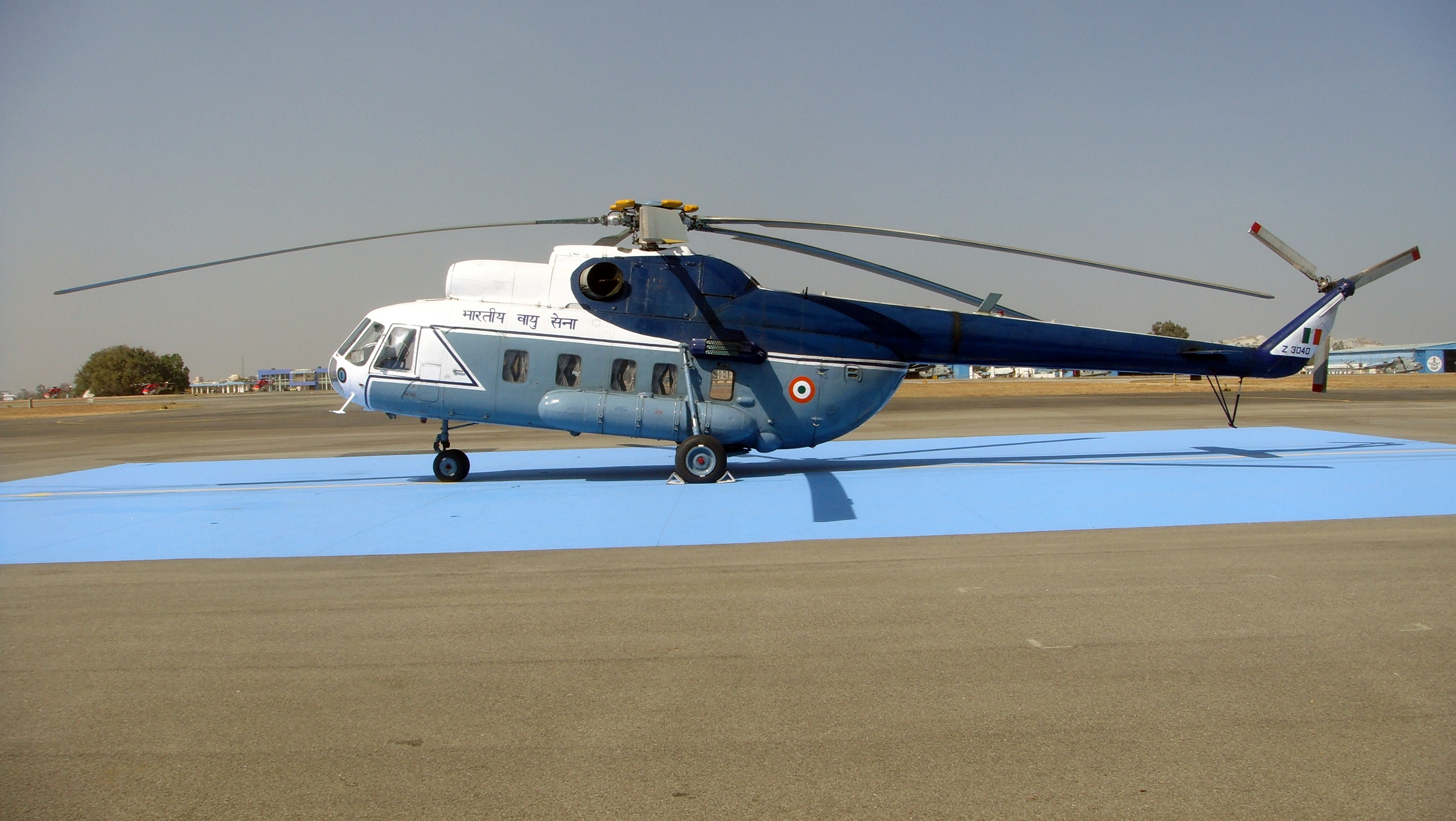
A helicopter of IAF's special VIP fleet meant for carrying the President of India

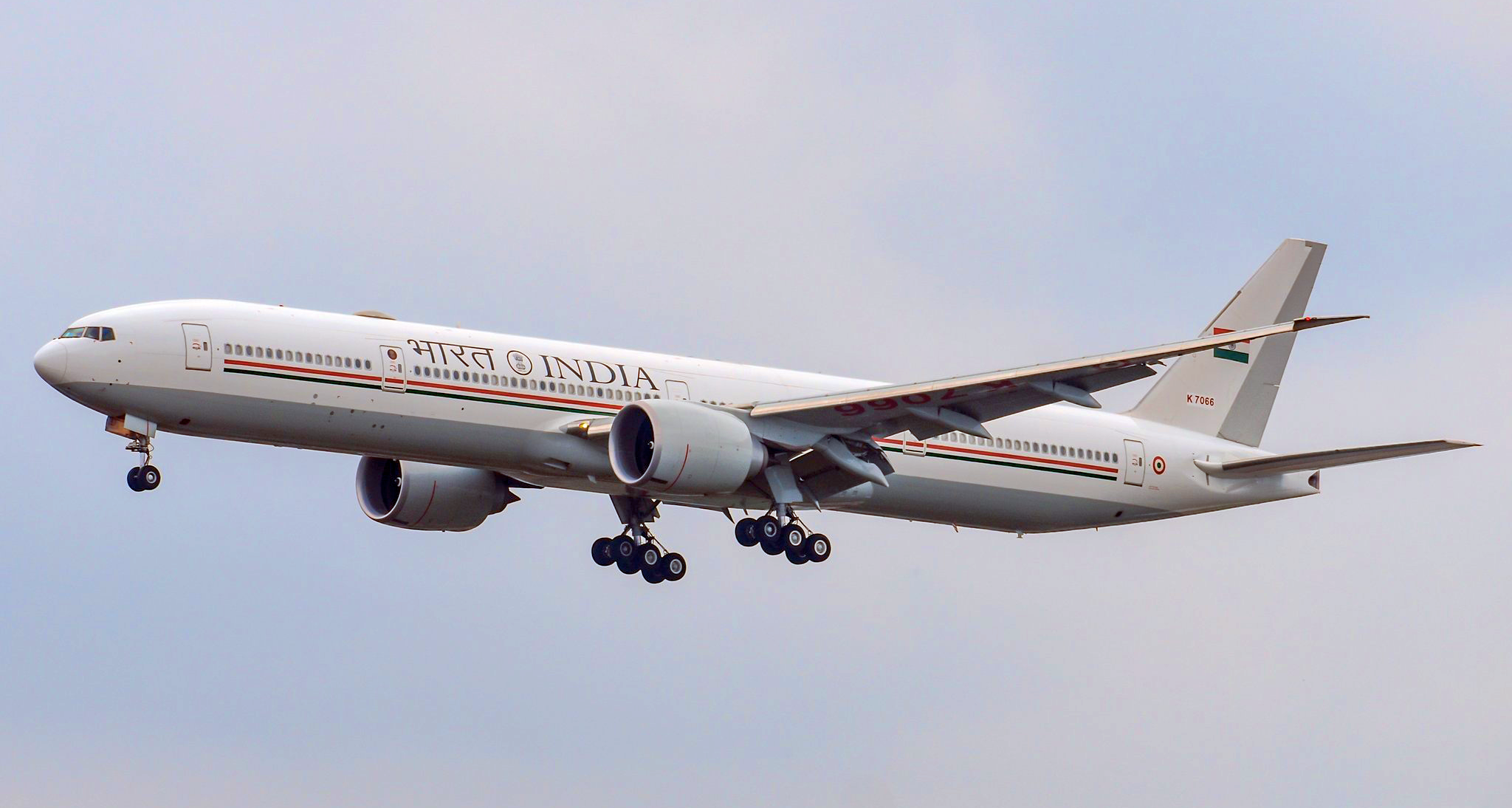
VIP B777 with call sign Air India One (INDIA 1) is used for international travels by the President.

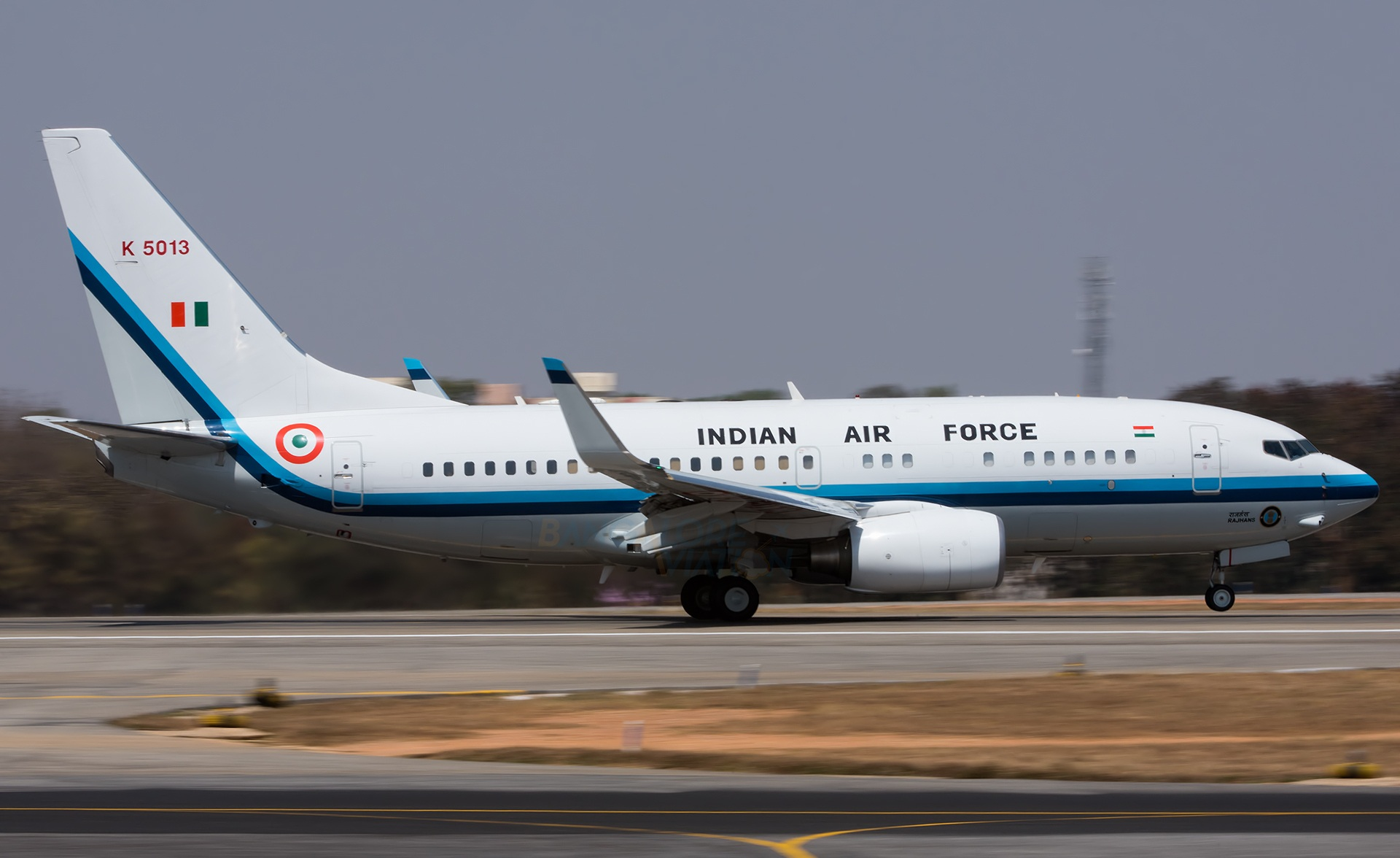
Indian Air Force's BBJ 737 with call sign Air India One (INDIA 1) is used for domestic travels by the President.

== Impeachment ==
The Supreme Court shall inquire and decide regarding all doubts and disputes arising out of or in connection with the election of a president per Article 71(1) of the constitution. The Supreme Court can remove the president for the electoral malpractices or upon being not eligible to be a member of the Lok Sabha under the Representation of the People Act, 1951. Subject to Article 71 (3), parliament made applicable rules/procedure to petition the supreme court for resolving the disputes only that arise during the election process of the president but not the doubts that arise from their unconstitutional actions/deeds or changing Indian citizenship during the tenure of the president which may violate the requisite election qualifications.

The president may also be removed before the expiry of the term through impeachment for violating the Constitution of India by the Parliament of India. The process may start in either of the two houses of the parliament. The house initiates the process by levelling the charges against the president. The charges are contained in a notice that has to be signed by at least one-quarter of the total members of that house. The notice is sent up to the president and 14 days later, it is taken up for consideration.

A resolution to impeach the president has to be passed by a two-thirds majority of the total number of members of the originating house. It is then sent to the other house. The other house investigates the charges that have been made. During this process, the president has the right to defend himself through an authorised counsel. If the second house also approves the charges made by the special majority again, the president stands impeached and is deemed to have vacated their office from the date when such a resolution stands passed. No president has faced impeachment proceedings so the above provisions have never been used.

Under Article 361 of the constitution, though the president cannot be summoned for questioning except on their voluntary willingness to testify in the court in support of their controversial deeds, the unconstitutional decisions taken by the president would be declared invalid by the courts. The case would be decided by the courts based on the facts furnished by the Union government for the president's role. As clarified by the supreme court in the case Rameshwar Prasad & Others vs Union of India & An Other on 24 January 2006; though the president cannot be prosecuted and imprisoned during their term of office, they can be prosecuted after he/she steps down from the post for any guilt committed during the term of the presidency as declared earlier by the courts. No president has resigned on impropriety to continue in office for declaring and nullifying their unconstitutional decisions by the courts till now. No criminal case at least on the grounds of disrespecting constitution is lodged till now against former presidents to punish them for their unconstitutional acts; though many decisions taken during the term of a president have been declared by the supreme court as unconstitutional, mala fides, void, ultra vires, etc.

== Succession ==
The Office of the president falls vacant in the following scenarios:

1. On the expiry of their term.
2. By reason of death.
3. By reason of resignation.
4. Removal by impeachment.

Article 65 of the Indian constitution says that the vice-president of India will have to discharge the duties, if the office falls vacant due to any reason other than the expiry of the term. The vice president reverts to their office when a new president is elected and enters office. When the president is unable to act because of absence, illness or any other cause, the vice president discharges the president's functions until the president resumes the duties.

A vice president who acts as or discharges the functions of the president has all the powers and immunities of the president and is entitled to the same emoluments as the president. When a vice president discharges the duties of the president, he/she does not function as the Chairperson of the Rajya Sabha.

The Indian parliament has enacted the law—The President (Discharge of Functions) Act, 1969 — for the discharge of the functions of the president when vacancies occur in the offices of the president and the vice president simultaneously, owing to removal, death, resignation of the incumbent or otherwise. In such an eventuality, the chief justice—or in their absence, the senior-most judge of the Supreme Court of India available—discharges the functions of the president until a newly elected president enters upon their office or a newly elected vice president begins to act as president under Article 65 of the constitution, whichever is the earlier. For example, in 1969, when President Zakir Husain died in office, Vice-President V. V. Giri served as the acting president of India. However, later, V.V Giri resigned from both posts (Acting President of India and Vice-President of India) as he became a candidate in the 1969 presidential election in India. In this event, the then chief justice of India, Justice Mohammad Hidayatullah served as the acting president of India until the next president was elected.

== President vs Chief Justice ==
President versus Chief Justice of India
President	Chief Justice of India / judiciary
The duties of President under their oath is to protect, defend and preserve the constitution and the law	Similar to president to uphold the constitution and the laws (Third Schedule of the constitution)
The oath is taken in the presence of the chief justice	The oath is taken in the presence of the president
Impeachment by parliament with a majority of not less than two-thirds of the total membership of each house of the parliament for violation of the constitution as per Article 61.	Removal from office by each house of the parliament supported by a majority of the total membership of that house and by a majority of not less than two-thirds of the members of that house present and voting on the ground of proved misbehaviour or incapacity as per Article 124(4)
President cannot directly be removed by the supreme court. However, the supreme court can declare the election of the president to be void and consequently remove the president from the post per Article 71(1) for committing electoral malpractices and upon ceasing to possess the requisite qualifications to be president.	President cannot remove judges once appointed by him without impeachment process per Article 124.
An individual heads the autonomous institution of President.	Judiciary/supreme court is also an autonomous institution represented by a team of supreme court judges with chief justice as its chief.
President being head of parliament, Executive and supreme commander of the armed forces, is fully empowered by the constitution to fulfil their judicial responsibility. They can also take the expert advice of the Attorney General and also chief justice in performing their judicial role. It is President's duty to ensure that every state's governance is carried on in accordance with the provisions of the constitution under Articles 355 and 356.	Chief justice/supreme court is also empowered by the constitution to repeal the unconstitutional activities of parliament and executive only after a fair trial.
President's prime duty is to prevent unconstitutional decisions of union and state governments and parliament or state assemblies by denying their compulsory assent for making them into applicable laws. They are the foremost defender of the constitution who can pre-empt the unconstitutional activities of executive and legislatures. The other duties of President are just ceremonial as head of the country which are attached to him for being protector, defender and preserver of the constitution. The institution of President becomes redundant if the president is confined to other ceremonial duties only.	Can intervene or nullify the unlawful actions of union/state governments and unconstitutional laws enacted by the parliament or a state legislative after presidential assent only.
President has constitutional immunity for their unconstitutional, mala fides activities during their tenure but is liable for judicial action/punishment for their unconstitutional activity after the term of their presidency. However, per Article 361 (1), President is answerable to a court designated by either house of the parliament with a two-thirds majority for the investigation of a charge against him under article 61.	Chief justice/judges of the supreme court are also immune from punishment for not delivering correct judgements or for their incompetence and mala fides. However, Judges' verdict can be repealed by a higher level bench of other judges.
President cannot be recalled by the people of India for not fulfilling their constitutional duties in case parliament is not impeaching the president or removed by the supreme court.	Chief justice/judges of the supreme court also cannot be recalled by the people of India in case parliament is not impeaching the judges.

== President vs Prime minister ==
President of India versus Prime Minister of India
President	Prime minister / Union cabinet
The duties of President under their oath is to protect, defend and preserve the constitution and the law	Swears allegiance to the Constitution of India as by law established, swears to uphold the sovereignty and integrity of India and swears to do right to all manner of people without fear or favour, affection or ill-will (Third Schedule of the constitution)
The oath is taken in the presence of the chief justice	The oath is taken in the presence of the president
Elected in an extensive manner indirectly by the members of Lok Sabha, Rajya Sabha, and state legislative assemblies in a secret ballot conducted by the Election Commission	Appointed by the President on the basis of majority of their political party or coalition in the Lok Sabha, through direct general elections.
Impeachment by parliament with a majority of not less than two-thirds of the total membership of each house of the parliament for violation of the constitution as per Article 61	Steps down upon losing majority support due to a no confidence vote in Lok Sabha.
President can be removed by the supreme court per Article 71(1) for committing electoral malpractices and upon ceasing to possess the requisite qualifications to be president	Similar to the prime minister and ministers also.
An individual heads the autonomous institution of President	Union cabinet with Prime minister as its chief is collectively responsible.
President being head of parliament, Executive and supreme commander of the armed forces, is fully empowered by the constitution to fulfil their judicial responsibility. They can also take the expert advice of the Attorney General and also chief justice in performing their judicial role. It is the President's duty to ensure that every state's governance is carried on in accordance with the provisions of the constitution under Articles 355 and 356	Rest of the governance of the union and reporting to the president on all important matters. Being the leader of the majority/ ruling party in the parliament, the union cabinet takes lead in lawmaking by the parliament needed for policy finalisation on various aspects, annual budgets finalisation, planning and implementation, etc.
President's prime function is to prevent unconstitutional decisions of union and state governments and parliament or state assemblies by denying their compulsory assent/government orders (GO) for making them into applicable laws. They are the foremost defender of the constitution who can pre-empt the unconstitutional activities of executive and legislatures.	Prime minister/Union cabinet shall aid and advise the president who shall, in the exercise of their functions, act in accordance with such advice as long as not unconstitutional. The prime minister shall communicate to the president all decisions of the Council of Ministers relating to the administration of the affairs of the Union and proposals for legislation and on President's desire submit related information. No minister shall decide on any matter without the council of ministers/ union cabinet approval per Article 78.
President has constitutional immunity for their unconstitutional, mala fides activities during their tenure but liable for judicial action/punishment for their unconstitutional activity after the term of presidency	The union cabinet has constitutional immunity from legal proceedings in any court for their mala fide and unconstitutional advice tendered by union ministers to the president per Article 74 (2).
President cannot escape from their constitutional duty by citing constitutional amendment to Article 74 (para 2 of 1) which makes him abide by the Union cabinet's advice after sending for reconsideration. As clarified by the supreme court, the object of Article 74 (2) is only to make the question whether the president had followed the advice of the union cabinet or acted contrary thereto, non-justiciable. Refer page Article 74#Court cases for more clarity	The union cabinet may escape from the punishment or responsibility for implementing unconstitutional laws citing Article 74 (2).
President cannot be recalled by the people of India for not fulfilling their constitutional duties in case parliament is not impeaching the president or removed by the supreme court or resigns on their own on moral grounds	Prime minister/ union cabinet cannot be recalled by the people of India till the end of their term in case they lose majority support in Lok Sabha or resigns on their own on moral grounds.

== Important presidential interventions in the past ==
The president's role as defender of the constitution and the powers as Head of State, especially in relation to those exercised by the prime minister as leader of the government, have changed over time. In particular, Presidents have made a number of interventions into government and lawmaking, which have established and challenged some conventions concerning presidential intervention.

=== Proving majority in the parliament ===
In 1979, Prime Minister Charan Singh did not enjoy a parliamentary majority. He responded to this by simply not advising the president to summon parliament. Since then, presidents have been more diligent in directing incoming Prime Ministers to convene parliament and prove their majority within reasonable deadlines (2 to 3 weeks). In the interim period, the Prime Ministers are generally restrained from making policy decisions.

=== Proof of Majority to form a Government ===
Since the 1990s, Parliamentary elections have generally not resulted in a single party or group of parties having a distinct majority, until the 2014 Lok Sabha elections when BJP received a clear majority. In such cases, presidents have used their discretion and directed prime ministerial aspirants to establish their credentials before being invited to form the government. Typically, the aspirants have been asked to produce letters from various party leaders, with the signatures of all the MPs who are pledging support to their candidature. This is in addition to the requirement that a prime minister proves he has the support of the Lok Sabha (by a vote on the floor of the house) within weeks of being sworn into office.

=== Vetoing of a Bill ===
Since the Indian constitution does not provide any time limit within which the president is to declare their assent or refusal, the president could exercise a "pocket veto" by not taking any action for an indefinite time. The veto was used in 1986 by President Zail Singh over the Postal Bill. The president did not give assent to the bill, arguing that its scope was too sweeping and would give the government arbitrary powers to intercept postal communications indiscriminately.

=== Rashtrapati Bhavan Communiqués ===
In the late 1990s, President K. R. Narayanan introduced a modicum of transparency and openness in the functioning of the President. This was by means of Rashtrapati Bhavan Communiqués explaining, to the nation, the thinking that led to the various decisions he took while exercising their discretionary powers.

=== Return of a Bill ===
The constitution gives the president the power to return a bill unsigned but it circumscribes the power to send it back only once for reconsideration. If the parliament sends back the bill with or without changes, the president is obliged to sign it. In mid-2006, President A. P. J. Abdul Kalam sent back a controversial bill regarding the exclusion of certain offices from the scope of 'offices of profit', the holding of which would disqualify a person from being a member of parliament. The combined opposition, the NDA, hailed the move. The UPA chose to send the bill back to the president without any changes and, after 17 days, Kalam gave his assent on 18 August 2006.

=== Sacking state governors ===
Arunachal Pradesh governor Jyoti Prasad Rajkhowa, who was earlier appointed by the ruling party at the centre, was sacked by President Pranab Mukherjee after the Supreme Court struck down his unconstitutional acts.

== Oath of office ==
The oath of office for the President of India is as follows:

I, (name), do swear in the name of God (or, solemnly affirm) that I will faithfully execute the office of President of India, and will do the best of my ability preserve, protect and defend the Constitution and the law, and that I will devote myself to the service and well-being of the people of Republic of India.

— Article 60, Constitution of India

Oath of office of President of India in Hindi Version

मैं, (अमुक), ईश्वर की शपथ लेता हूँ (सत्यनिष्ठा से प्रतिज्ञान करता हूँ) कि मैं श्रद्धापूर्वक भारत के राष्ट्रपति के पद का कार्यपालन (अथवा राष्ट्रपति के कृत्यों का निर्वहन) करूँगा, तथा अपनी पूरी योग्यता से संविधान और विधि का परिरक्षण, संरक्षण और प्रतिरक्षण करूँगा, और मैं भारत की जनता की सेवा और कल्याण में निरत रहूँगा।

— अनुच्‍छेद 60, भारत का संविधान

== See also ==
- List of presidents of India
- Spouse of the President of India
