= Constitution of India =

Supreme legal document of India since 1950

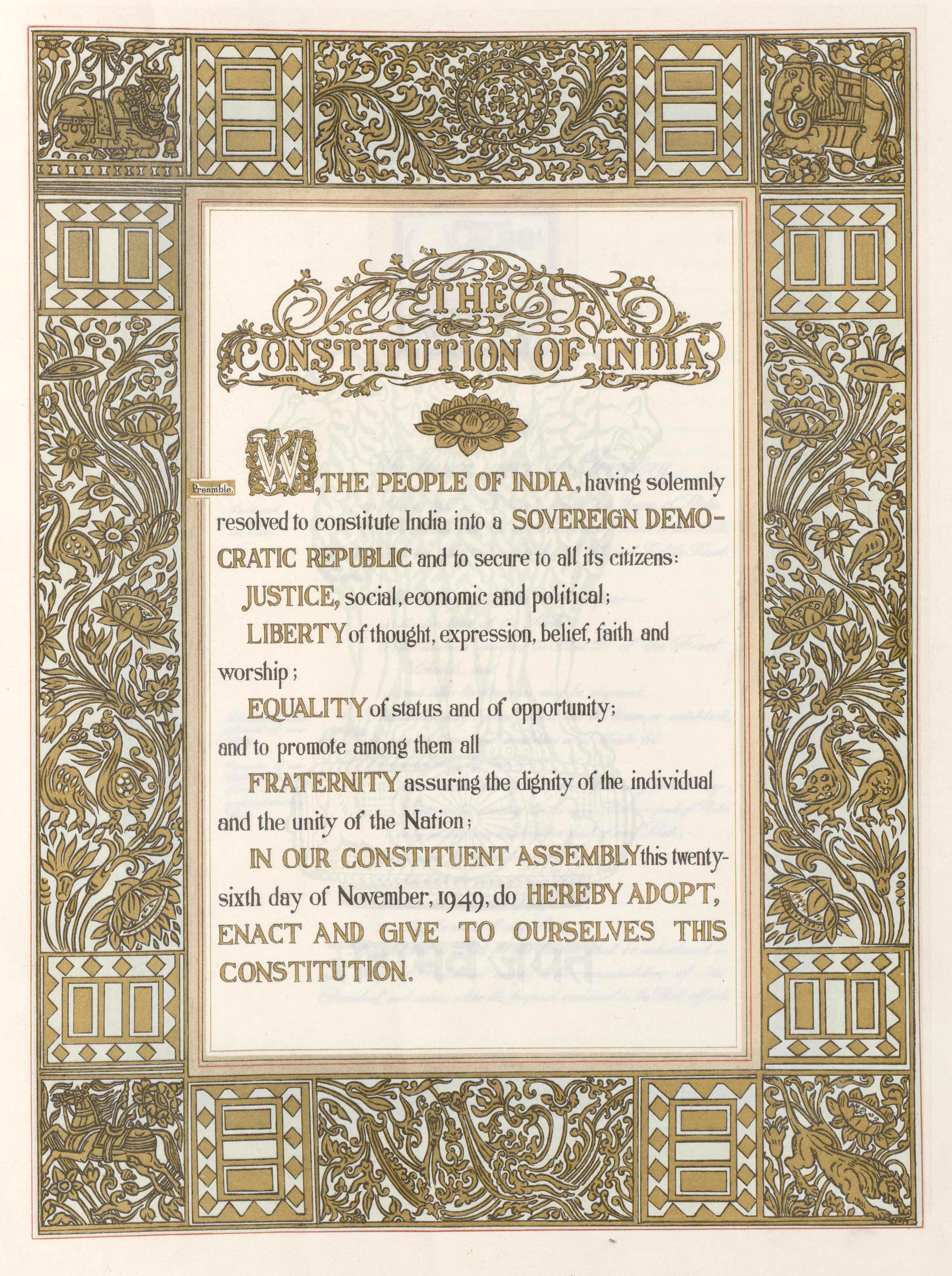
- Original text of the preamble

Overview
- Jurisdiction: India
- Ratified: 26 November 1949 (76 years ago)
- Date effective: 26 January 1950 (76 years ago)
- System: Federal parliamentary constitutional republic

Government structure
- Branches: Three; Executive; Legislature; Judiciary
- Head of state: President of India
- Chambers: Bicameral; Rajya Sabha; Lok Sabha
- Executive: Prime Minister–led cabinet responsible to the lower house of the Parliament
- Judiciary: Supreme court, high courts, and district courts
- Federalism: Federal
- Electoral college: Yes, for presidential and vice presidential elections
- Entrenchments: 2

History
- Amendments: 106
- Last amended: 28 September 2023 (106th)
- Citation: Constitution of India (PDF), 10 September 2026
- Location: Samvidhan Sadan, New Delhi, India
- Signatories: 284 members of the Constituent Assembly
- Supersedes: Government of India Act 1935; Indian Independence Act 1947

The Constitution of India is the supreme legal document of India, and the longest written national constitution in the world. The document lays down the framework that demarcates fundamental political code, structure, procedures, powers, and duties of government institutions and sets out fundamental rights, directive principles, and the duties of citizens.

It espouses constitutional supremacy (not parliamentary supremacy found in the United Kingdom, since it was created by a constituent assembly rather than Parliament) and was adopted with a declaration in its preamble. The Indian Constitution does not contain a provision to limit the powers of the parliament to amend the constitution. However, the Supreme Court in Kesavananda Bharati v. State of Kerala held that there were certain features of the Constitution so integral to its functioning and existence that they could never be cut out of the constitution (known as the 'Basic Structure' Doctrine).

The Government of India Act 1935, mainly drafted by Samuel Hoare, provided the basis for the constitution of India. The Constituent Assembly of India adopted the constitution on 26 November 1949 and became effective on 26 January 1950. It became the country's fundamental governing document, and the Dominion of India became the Republic of India. To ensure constitutional autochthony, its framers repealed prior acts of the British parliament, in Article 395. India celebrates its constitution on 26 January as Republic Day.

The constitution declares India a sovereign, socialist, secular, and democratic republic, assures its citizens justice, equality, and liberty, and endeavours to promote fraternity. The original 1950 constitution is preserved in a nitrogen-filled case at the Parliament Library Building in New Delhi.

== Background ==
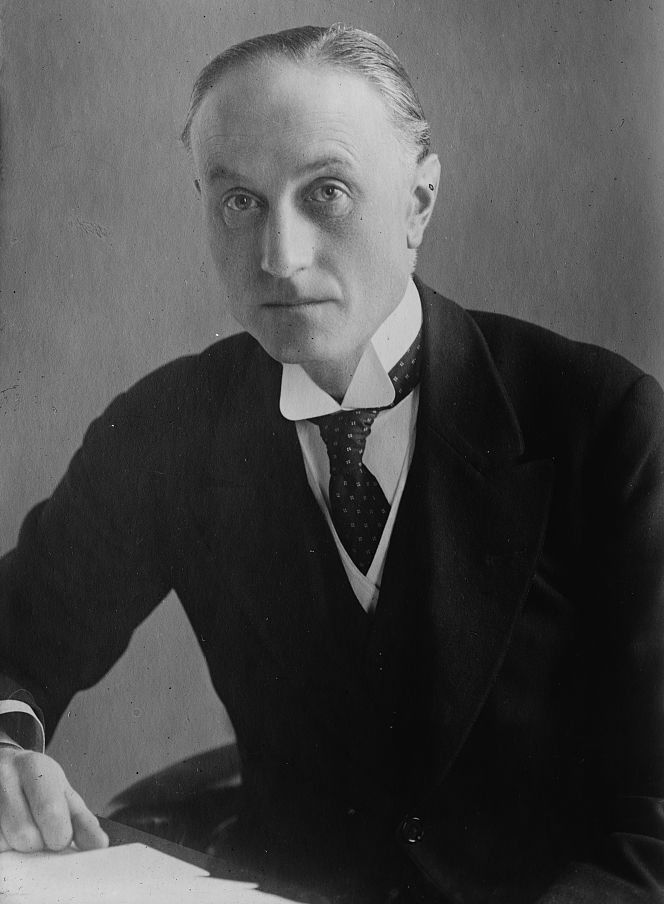
Samuel Hoare significantly drafted the Government of India Act 1935 which formed the basis for the Indian constitution.

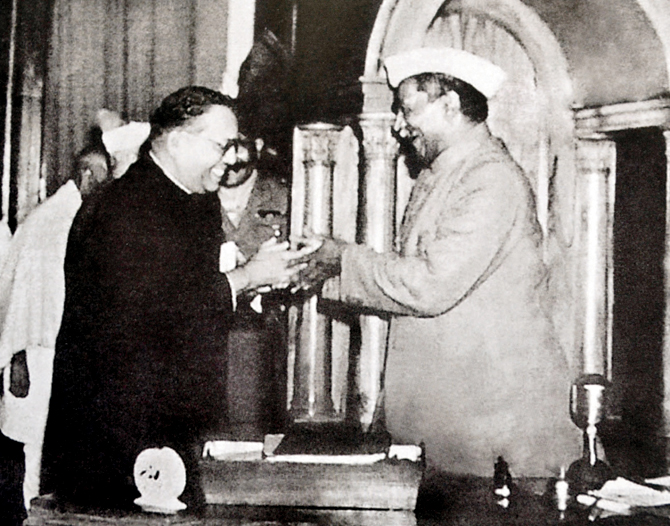
Babasaheb Ambedkar, chairman of the drafting committee, presenting the final draft of the Indian constitution to Constituent Assembly president Rajendra Prasad on 25 November 1949

In 1928, the All Parties Conference convened a committee in Lucknow to prepare the Constitution of India, which was known as the Nehru Report.

With the exception of scattered French and Portuguese exclaves, India was under the British rule from 1858 to 1947. From 1947 to 1950, the same legislation continued to be implemented as India was a dominion of United Kingdom for these three years, as most of the princely states were convinced by Jawaharlal Nehru, Sardar Patel and Louis Mountbatten to sign the articles of integration with India, and the British Government continued to be responsible for the external security of the country. Thus, the constitution of India repealed the Indian Independence Act 1947 and Government of India Act 1935 when it became effective on 26 January 1950. India ceased to be a dominion of the British Crown and became a sovereign, democratic republic with the constitution. Articles 5, 6, 7, 8, 9, 60, 324, 366, 367, 379, 380, 388, 391, 392, 393, and 394 of the constitution came into force on 26 November 1949, and the remaining articles became effective on 26 January 1950 which is celebrated every year in India as Republic Day.

=== Previous legislation ===
The Indian constitution was drawn from a number of sources, mainly the Government of India Act 1935 which was significantly drafted by Samuel Hoare. Mindful of India's needs and conditions, its framers borrowed features of previous legislation such as the Government of India Act 1858, the Indian Councils Acts of 1861, 1892 and 1909, the Government of India Acts 1919 and 1935, and the Indian Independence Act 1947. The latter, which led to the creation of Pakistan, divided the former Constituent Assembly in two. Each new assembly had sovereign power to draft and enact a new constitution for the separate states.

== Constituent Assembly ==
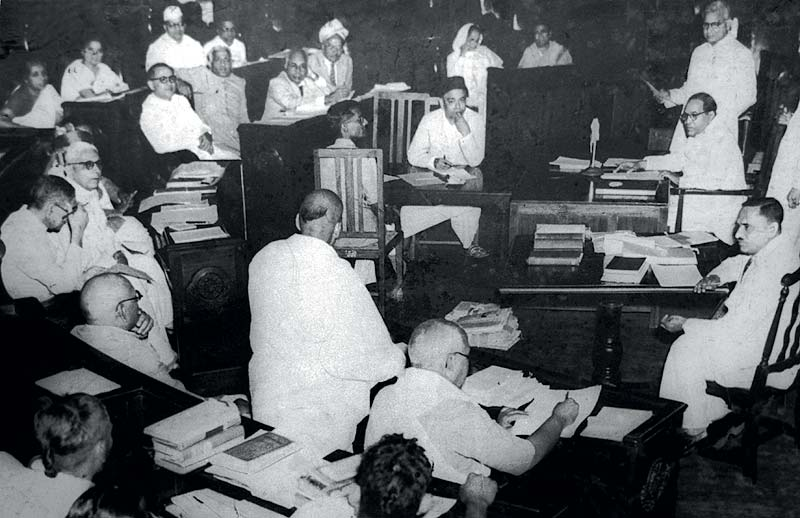
1950 Constituent Assembly meeting

The constitution was drafted by the Constituent Assembly, which was elected by elected members of the provincial assemblies. The 389-member assembly (reduced to 299 after the partition of India) took almost three years to draft the constitution holding eleven sessions over a 165-day period.

In the constitution assembly, a member of the drafting committee, T. T. Krishnamachari said:

Mr. President, Sir, I am one of those in the House who have listened to Dr. Ambedkar very carefully. I am aware of the amount of work and enthusiasm that he has brought to bear on the work of drafting this Constitution. At the same time, I do realise that that amount of attention that was necessary for the purpose of drafting a constitution so important to us at this moment has not been given to it by the Drafting Committee. The House is perhaps aware that of the seven members nominated by you, one had resigned from the House and was replaced. One died and was not replaced. One was away in America and his place was not filled up and another person was engaged in State affairs, and there was a void to that extent. One or two people were far away from Delhi and perhaps reasons of health did not permit them to attend. So it happened ultimately that the burden of drafting this constitution fell on Dr. Ambedkar and I have no doubt that we are grateful to him for having achieved this task in a manner which is undoubtedly commendable.

B. R. Ambedkar in his concluding speech in constituent assembly on 25 November 1949 stated that:

The credit that is given to me does not really belong to me. It belongs partly to Sir B.N. Rau the Constitutional Advisor to the Constituent Assembly who prepared a rough draft of the Constitution for the consideration of Drafting Committee. A part of the credit must go to the members of the Drafting Committee who, as I have said, have sat for 141 days and without whose ingenuity to devise new formulae and capacity to tolerate and to accommodate different points of view, the task of framing the Constitution could not have come to so successful a conclusion. Much greater share of the credit must go to Mr. S. N. Mukherjee, the Chief Draftsman of the Constitution. His ability to put the most intricate proposals in the simplest and clearest legal form can rarely be equalled, nor his capacity for hard work. He has been an acquisition to the Assembly. Without his help this Assembly would have taken many more years to finalise the Constitution. I must not omit to mention the members of the staff working under Mr. Mukherjee. For, I known how hard they worked and how long they have toiled sometimes even beyond midnight. I want to thank them all for their effort and their co-operation.

While deliberating the revised draft constitution, the assembly moved, discussed and disposed off 2,473 amendments out of a total of 7,635.

=== Timeline of formation of the Constitution of India ===
- 6 December 1946: Formation of the Constitution Assembly (in accordance with French practice).
- 9 December 1946: The first meeting was held in the constitution hall (now the Central Hall of Parliament House). The 1st person to address was J. B. Kripalani, Sachchidananda Sinha became temporary president. (Demanding a separate state, the Muslim League boycotted the meeting.)
- 11 December 1946: The Assembly appointed Rajendra Prasad as its president, H. C. Mukherjee as its vice-president and, B. N. Rau as constitutional legal adviser. (There were initially 389 members in total, which declined to 299 after partition, out of the 389 members, 292 were from government provinces, four from chief commissioner provinces and 93 from princely states.)
- 13 December 1946: An "Objective Resolution" was presented by Jawaharlal Nehru, laying down the underlying principles of the constitution. This later became the Preamble of the Constitution.
- 22 January 1947: Objective resolution unanimously adopted.
- 22 July 1947: National flag adopted.
- 15 August 1947: Achieved independence. India split into the Dominion of India and the Dominion of Pakistan.
- 29 August 1947: Drafting Committee appointed with B. R. Ambedkar as its chairman. The other six members of committee were K.M. Munshi, Muhammed Sadulla, Alladi Krishnaswamy Iyer, N. Gopalaswami Ayyangar, Devi Prasad Khaitan and BL Mitter.
- 16 July 1948: Along with Harendra Coomar Mookerjee, V. T. Krishnamachari was also elected as second vice-president of Constituent Assembly.
- 26 November 1949: The Constitution of India was passed and adopted by the assembly.
- 24 January 1950: Last meeting of Constituent Assembly. The Constitution was signed and accepted (with 395 Articles, 8 Schedules, and 22 Parts).
- 26 January 1950: The Constitution came into force. (The process took 2 years, 11 months and 18 days—at a total expenditure of ₹6.4 million to finish.)

G. V. Mavlankar was the first Speaker of the Lok Sabha (the lower house of Parliament) after India turned into a republic.

=== Membership ===
B. R. Ambedkar, Sanjay Phakey, Jawaharlal Nehru, C. Rajagopalachari, Rajendra Prasad, Vallabhbhai Patel, Kanaiyalal Maneklal Munshi, Ganesh Vasudev Mavalankar, Sandipkumar Patel, Abul Kalam Azad, Shyama Prasad Mukherjee, Nalini Ranjan Ghosh, and Balwantrai Mehta were key figures in the assembly, which had over 30 representatives of the scheduled classes. Frank Anthony represented the Anglo-Indian community, and the Parsis were represented by H. P. Modi. Harendra Coomar Mookerjee, a Christian assembly vice-president, chaired the minorities committee and represented non-Anglo-Indian Christians. Ari Bahadur Gurung represented the Gorkha community. Judges, such as Alladi Krishnaswamy Iyer, Benegal Narsing Rau, K. M. Munshi and Ganesh Mavlankar were members of the assembly. Female members included Sarojini Naidu, Hansa Mehta, Durgabai Deshmukh, Amrit Kaur and Vijaya Lakshmi Pandit.

The first, two-day president of the assembly was Sachchidananda Sinha; Rajendra Prasad was later elected president. It met for the first time on 9 December 1946.

=== Drafting ===
Sir B. N. Rau, a civil servant who became the first Indian judge in the International Court of Justice and was president of the United Nations Security Council, was appointed as the assembly's constitutional advisor in 1946. Responsible for the constitution's general structure, Rau prepared its initial draft in February 1948. The draft of B.N. Rau consisted of 243 articles and 13 schedules which came to 395 articles and 8 schedules after discussions, debates and amendments.

At 14 August 1947 meeting of the assembly, committees were proposed. Rau's draft was considered, debated and amended by the seven-member drafting committee, which was appointed on 29 August 1947 with B. R. Ambedkar as chair. A revised draft constitution was prepared by the committee and submitted to the assembly on 4 November 1947.

Before adopting the constitution, the assembly held eleven sessions in 165 days. On 26 November 1949, it adopted the constitution, which was signed by 284 members. The day is celebrated as National Law Day, or Constitution Day. The day was chosen to spread the importance of the constitution and to spread thoughts and ideas of Ambedkar.

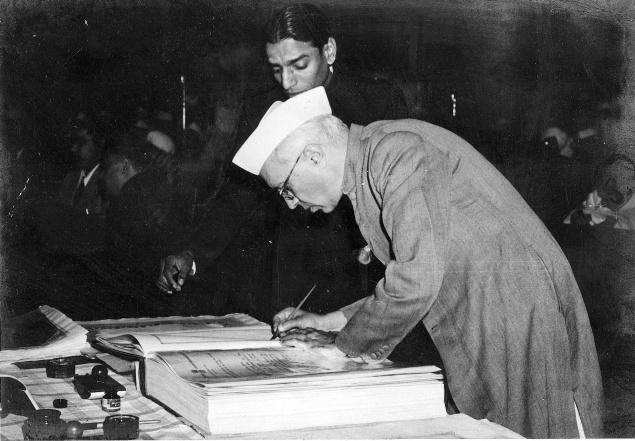
Jawaharlal Nehru signing the constitution

The assembly's final session convened on 24 January 1950. Each member signed two copies of the constitution, one in Hindi and the other in English. The original constitution is hand-written, with each page decorated by artists from Shantiniketan including Beohar Rammanohar Sinha and Nandalal Bose. Its calligrapher was Prem Behari Narain Raizada. The constitution was published in Dehradun and photolithographed by the Survey of India. Production of the original constitution took nearly five years. Two days later, on 26 January 1950, it became the law of India. The estimated cost of the Constituent Assembly was ₹6.3 crore. The constitution has had more than 100 amendments since it was enacted.

== Influence of other constitutions ==
| Government | Influence |
|---|---|
| United Kingdom | Parliamentary government; Nominal head of the state; Post of Prime Minister; More powerful lower house; Concept of single citizenship; Legislative procedure; Bicameral legislature; Rule of law; Cabinet system; The legislative speaker and their role; Prerogative writ; Parliamentary privilege |
| United States | Bill of Rights (Fundamental rights); Written constitution; Preamble to the Constitution; Federal structure of government; Impeachment of the president; Post of the vice president and his functions; The institution of the Supreme Court; Removal of Supreme Court and High courts judges; Electoral College; Independent judiciary and separation of powers; Judicial review; President as commander-in-chief of the armed forces; Equal protection under law |
| (Republic of Ireland) Ireland | Directive principles of state policy; Nomination of members to the Rajya Sabha by the president; Method of election of the president |
| Australia | Freedom of trade between states; Federal legislative power to implement treaties, even on matters outside normal federal jurisdiction; Concurrent List; Provision of Joint Session of the Parliament; Preamble terminology |
| France | Notions of liberté, égalité, fraternité (liberty, equality, fraternity) in the preamble; The ideals of republic in the preamble |
| Canada | Quasi-federal government—a federal system with a strong central government; Distribution of powers between the central and state governments; Residual powers, retained by the central government; Appointment of Governor of states by Centre; Advisory jurisdiction of the Supreme Court |
| Soviet Union | Fundamental Duties under article 51-A.; Mandated planning commission to oversee economic development; Ideals of justice (social, economic and political) in the preamble |
| (Germany) Weimar Republic | Suspension of fundamental rights during emergency |
| South Africa | Amendment procedure of the constitution; Election of members of Rajya Sabha |
| Japan | Procedure established by law; Laws on which the Supreme Court functions |

== Structure ==
The Indian constitution is the world's longest for a sovereign nation. At its enactment, it had 395 articles in 22 parts and 8 schedules. (Note: Although the last article of the 1974 Constitution of Yugoslavia was Article 406, the Yugoslav constitution contained about 56,000 words in its English translation) At about 145,000 words, it is the second-longest active constitution—after the Constitution of Alabama—in the world.

The amended constitution has a preamble and 470 articles, (Note: Although the last article of the constitution is Article 395, the total number in March 2013 was 465. New articles added through amendments have been inserted in the relevant location of the original constitution. To not disturb the original numbering, new articles are inserted alphanumerically; Article 21A, pertaining to the right to education, was inserted by the 86th Amendment Act.) which are grouped into 25 parts. (Note: The Constitution was in 22 Parts originally. Part VII & IX (older) was repealed in 1956, whereas newly added Part IVA, IXA, IXB & XIVA by Amendments to the Constitution in different times (lastly added IXB by the 97th Amendment).) With 12 schedules (Note: By the 73rd and 74th Amendments, the lists of administrative subjects of Panchayat raj & Municipality were included in the Constitution as Schedules 11 and 12 respectively in the year 1993.) and five appendices, it has been amended 106 times; the latest amendment was given assent on 28 September 2023.

The constitution's articles are grouped into the following parts:

- Preamble, with the words "socialist", "secular" and 'integrity' added in 1976 by the 42nd amendment
- Part I – The Union and its Territory – Articles 1 to 4
- Part II – Citizenship – Articles 5 to 11
- Part III – Fundamental Rights – Articles 12 to 35
- Part IV – Directive Principles of State Policy – Articles 36 to 51
- Part IVA – Fundamental Duties – Article 51A
- Part V – The Union – Articles 52 to 151
- Part VI – The States – Articles 152 to 237
- Part VII – States in the B part of the first schedule (repealed) – Article 238
- Part VIII – Union Territories – Articles 239 to 242
- Part IX – Panchayats – Articles 243 to 243(O)
- Part IXA – Municipalities – Articles 243(P) to 243(ZG)
- Part IXB – Co-operative societies – Articles 243(ZH) to 243(ZT)
- Part X – Scheduled and tribal areas – Articles 244 to 244A
- Part XI – Relations between the Union and the States – Articles 245 to 263
- Part XII – Finance, property, contracts and suits – Articles 264 to 300A
- Part XIII – Trade and commerce within India – Articles 301 to 307
- Part XIV – Services under the union and states – Articles 308 to 323
- Part XIVA – Tribunals – Articles 323A to 323B
- Part XV – Elections – Articles 324 to 329A
- Part XVI – Special provisions relating to certain classes – Articles 330 to 342A
- Part XVII – Languages – Articles 343 to 351
- Part XVIII – Emergency provisions – Articles 352 to 360
- Part XIX – Miscellaneous – Articles 361 to 367
- Part XX – Amendment of the Constitution – Articles 368
- Part XXI – Temporary, transitional and special provisions – Articles 369 to 392
- Part XXII – Short title, date of commencement, authoritative text in Hindi and repeals – Articles 393 to 395

=== Schedules ===
Schedules are lists in the constitution which categorise and tabulate bureaucratic activity and government policy.

| Schedule | Article(s) | Description |
|---|---|---|
| First | 1 and 4 | Lists India's states and territories, changes in their borders and the laws used to make that change. |
| Second | 59(3), 65(3), 75(6), 97, 125, 148(3), 158(3), 164(5), 186 and 221 | Lists the salaries of public officials, judges, and the comptroller and auditor general. |
| Third | 75(4), 99, 124(6), 148(2), 164(3), 188 and 219 | Forms of oaths – Lists the oaths of office for elected officials and judges |
| Fourth | 4(1) and 80(2) | Details the allocation of seats in the Rajya Sabha (upper house of Parliament) by state or union territory. |
| Fifth | 244(1) | Provides for the administration and control of Scheduled Areas (Note: Scheduled Areas are autonomous areas within a state, administered federally and usually mainly populated by a Scheduled Tribe.) and Scheduled Tribes (Note: Scheduled Tribes are groups of indigenous people, identified in the Constitution, who are struggling socioeconomically) (areas and tribes requiring special protection). |
| Sixth | 244(2) and 275(1) | Provisions made for the administration of tribal areas in Assam, Meghalaya, Tripura, and Mizoram. |
| Seventh | 246 | Central government, state, and concurrent lists of responsibilities |
| Eighth | 344(1) and 351 | Official languages |
| Ninth | 31-B | Validation of certain acts and regulations. (Note: Originally Articles mentioned here were immune from judicial review on the ground that they violated fundamental rights, but in a landmark judgement in 2007, the Supreme Court of India held in I.R. Coelho v. State of Tamil Nadu and others that laws included in the 9th schedule can be subject to judicial review if they violated the fundamental rights guaranteed under Article 14, 15, 19, 21 or the basic structure of the Constitution – I.R. Coelho (dead) by L.Rs. v. State of Tamil Nadu and others(2007) 2 S.C.C. 1) |
| Tenth | 102(2) and 191(2) | Anti-defection provisions for members of Parliament and state legislatures. |
| Eleventh | 243-G | Panchayat Raj (rural local government) |
| Twelfth | 243-W | Municipalities (urban local government) |

=== Appendices ===
- Appendix I – The Constitution (Application to Jammu and Kashmir) Order, 1954
- Appendix II – Re-statement, referring to the constitution's present text, of exceptions and modifications applicable to the state of Jammu and Kashmir
- Appendix III – Extracts from the Constitution (Forty-fourth Amendment) Act, 1978
- Appendix IV – The Constitution (Eighty-sixth Amendment) Act, 2002
- Appendix V – The Constitution (Eighty-eighth Amendment) Act, 2003

== Governmental sources of power ==
The executive, legislative, and judicial branches of government receive their power from the constitution and are bound by it. With the aid of its constitution, India is governed by a parliamentary system of government with the executive directly accountable to the legislature though the two partially overlap each other.

- Under Articles 52 and 53: the president of India is head of the executive branch
- Under Article 60: the duty of preserving, protecting, and defending the constitution and the law.
- Under Article 74: the prime minister is the head of the Council of Ministers, which aids and advises the president in the performance of their constitutional duties.
- Under Article 75(3): the Council of Ministers is answerable to the lower house.

The constitution is considered federal in nature, and unitary in spirit. It has features of a federation, including a codified, supreme constitution; a three-tier governmental structure (central, state and local); division of powers between Centre and states; bicameralism; and an independent judiciary. It also possesses unitary features such as a single constitution, single citizenship, an integrated judiciary, a flexible constitution, a strong central government, appointment of state governors by the central government, All India Services (the IAS, IFS and IPS), and emergency provisions. This unique combination makes it quasi-federal in form.

Each state and union territory has its own government. Analogous to the president and prime minister, each has a governor or (in union territories) a lieutenant governor and a chief minister. Article 356 permits the president to dismiss a state government and assume direct authority if a situation arises in which state government cannot be conducted in accordance with constitution. This power, known as president's rule, was abused as state governments came to be dismissed on flimsy grounds for political reasons. After S. R. Bommai v. Union of India, such a course of action is more difficult since the courts have asserted their right of review.

The 73rd and 74th Amendment Acts introduced the system of panchayati raj in rural areas and Nagar Palikas in urban areas. Article 370 gave special status to the state of Jammu and Kashmir.

=== The legislature and amendments ===
Article 368 dictates the procedure for constitutional amendments. Amendments are additions, variations or repeal of any part of the constitution by Parliament. An amendment bill must be passed by each house of Parliament by a two-thirds majority of its total membership when at least two-thirds are present and vote. Certain amendments pertaining to the constitution's federal nature must also be ratified by a majority of state legislatures.

Unlike ordinary bills in accordance with Article 245 (except for money bills), there is no provision for a joint session of the Lok Sabha and Rajya Sabha to pass a constitutional amendment. During a parliamentary recess, the president cannot promulgate ordinances under his legislative powers under Article 123, Chapter III.

Despite the supermajority requirement for amendments to pass, the Indian constitution is the world's most frequently-amended national governing document. The constitution is so specific in spelling out government powers that many amendments address issues dealt with by statute in other democracies.

In 2000, the Justice Manepalli Narayana Rao Venkatachaliah Commission was formed to examine a constitutional update. The commission submitted its report on 31 March 2002. However, the recommendations of this report have not been accepted by the consecutive governments.

The government of India establishes term-based law commissions to recommend legal reforms, facilitating the rule of law.

==== Limitations ====
In Kesavananda Bharati v. State of Kerala, the Supreme Court ruled that an amendment cannot destroy what it seeks to modify; it cannot tinker with the constitution's basic structure or framework, which are immutable. Such an amendment will be declared invalid, although no part of the constitution is protected from amendment; the basic structure doctrine does not protect any one provision of the constitution. According to the doctrine, the constitution's basic features (when "read as a whole") cannot be abridged or abolished. These "basic features" have not been fully defined, and whether a particular provision of the constitution is a "basic feature" is decided by the courts.

The Kesavananda Bharati v. State of Kerala decision laid down the constitution's basic structure:

1. Supremacy of the constitution
2. Republican, democratic form of government
3. Its secular nature
4. Separation of powers
5. Its federal character

This implies that Parliament can only amend the constitution to the limit of its basic structure. The Supreme Court or a high court may declare the amendment null and void if this is violated, after a judicial review. This is typical of parliamentary governments, where the judiciary checks parliamentary power.

In its 1967 Golak Nath v. State of Punjab decision, the Supreme Court ruled that the state of Punjab could not restrict any fundamental rights protected by the basic structure doctrine. The extent of land ownership and practice of a profession, in this case, were considered fundamental rights. The ruling was overturned with the ratification of the 24th Amendment in 1971.

=== The judiciary ===
The judiciary is the final arbiter of the constitution. Its duty (mandated by the constitution) is to act as a watchdog, preventing any legislative or executive act from overstepping constitutional bounds. The judiciary protects the fundamental rights of the people (enshrined in the constitution) from infringement by any state body, and balances the conflicting exercise of power between the central government and a state (or states).

The courts are expected to remain unaffected by pressure exerted by other branches of the state, citizens or interest groups. An independent judiciary has been held as a basic feature of the constitution, which cannot be changed by the legislature or the executive. Article 50 of the Constitution provides that the state must take measures to separate the judiciary from the executive in the public services.

==== Judicial review ====
Judicial review was adopted by the constitution of India from judicial review in the United States. In the Indian constitution, judicial review is dealt with in Article 13. The constitution is the supreme power of the nation, and governs all laws. According to Article 13:

1. All pre-constitutional laws, if they conflict wholly or in part with the constitution, shall have all conflicting provisions deemed ineffective until an amendment to the constitution ends the conflict; the law will again come into force if it is compatible with the constitution as amended (the Doctrine of Eclipse).
2. Laws made after the adoption of the constitution must be compatible with it, or they will be deemed void ab initio.
3. In such situations, the Supreme Court (or a high court) determines if a law is in conformity with the constitution. If such an interpretation is not possible because of inconsistency (and where separation is possible), the provision which is inconsistent with the constitution is considered void. In addition to Article 13, Articles 32, 226 and 227 provide the constitutional basis for judicial review.

Due to the adoption of the Thirty-eighth Amendment, the Supreme Court was not allowed to preside over any laws adopted during a state of emergency which infringe fundamental rights under article 32 (the right to constitutional remedies). The Forty-second Amendment widened Article 31C and added Articles 368(4) and 368(5), stating that any law passed by Parliament could not be challenged in court. The Supreme Court ruled in Minerva Mills v. Union of India that judicial review is a basic characteristic of the constitution, overturning Articles 368(4), 368(5) and 31C.

=== The executive ===
Chapter 1 of the Constitution of India creates a parliamentary system, with a prime minister who, in practice, exercises most executive power. The prime minister must have the support of a majority of the members of the Lok Sabha, or lower House of Parliament. If the prime minister does not have the support of a majority, the Lok Sabha can pass a motion of no confidence, removing the prime minister from office. Thus the prime minister is the member of parliament who leads the majority party or a coalition comprising a majority. The prime minister governs with the aid of a Council of Ministers, which the prime minister appoints and whose members head ministries. Importantly, Article 75 establishes that "the Council of Ministers shall be collectively responsible to the House of the People" or Lok Sabha. The Lok Sabha interprets this article to mean that the entire Council of Ministers can be subjected to a no confidence motion. If a no confidence motion succeeds, the entire Council of Ministers must resign.

Despite the prime minister exercising executive power in practice, the constitution bestows all the national government's executive power in the office of the president. This de jure power is not exercised in reality, however. Article 74 requires the president follow the "aid and advice" of the council, headed by the prime minister. In practice, this means that president's role is mostly ceremonial, with the prime minister exercising executive power because the president is obligated to act on the prime minister's wishes. The president does retain the power to ask the council to reconsider its advice, however, an action the president may take publicly. The council is not required to make any changes before resubmitting the advice to the president, in which case the president is constitutionally required to adhere to it, overriding the president's discretion. Previous presidents have used this occasion to make public statements about their reasoning for sending a decision back to the council, in an attempt to sway public opinion. This system, with an executive who only possesses nominal power and an official "advisor" who possess actual power, is based on the British system and is a result of colonial influences on India before and during the writing of its constitution.

The president is chosen by an electoral college composed of the members of both the national and state legislatures. Article 55 outlines the specifics of the electoral college. Half of the votes in the electoral college are assigned to state representatives in proportion to the population of each state and the other half are assigned to the national representatives. The voting is conducted using a secret, single transferable vote.

While the Constitution gives the legislative powers to the two Houses of Parliament, Article 111 requires the president's signature for a bill to become law. Just as with the advice of the council, the president can refuse to sign and send it back to the Parliament, but the Parliament can in turn send it back to the president who must then sign it.

==== Dismissal of the prime minister ====
Despite the president's mandate to obey the advice of the prime minister and the council, Article 75 declares that both "shall hold office during the pleasure of the president." This means the president has the constitutional power to dismiss the prime minister or Council at anytime. If the prime minister still retained a majority vote in the Lok Sabha, however, this could trigger a constitutional crisis because the same article of the Constitution states that the Council of Ministers is responsible to the Lok Sabha and must command a majority in it. In practice the issue has never arisen, though President Zail Singh threatened to remove Prime Minister Rajiv Gandhi from office in 1987.

==== Presidential power to legislate ====
When either or both Houses of Parliament are not in session, the prime minister, acting via the president, can unilaterally exercise the legislative power, creating ordinances that have the force of law. These ordinances expire six weeks after Parliament reconvenes or sooner if both Houses disapprove. The Constitution declares that ordinances should only be issued when circumstances arise that require "immediate action." Because this term is not defined, governments have begun abusing the ordinance system to enact laws that could not pass both Houses of Parliament, according to some commentators. This appears to be more common with divided government; when the prime minister's party controls the lower house but not the upper house, ordinances can be used to avoid needing the approval of the opposition in the upper house. In recent years, around ten ordinances have been passed annually, though at the peak of their use, over 30 were passed in a single year. Ordinances can vary widely on their topic; recent examples of ordinances include items as varied as modifications to land owner rights, emergency responses to the COVID-19 pandemic, and changes to banking regulations.

== Federalism ==
The first article of the Constitution declares that India is a "Union of States". Under the Constitution, the states retain key powers for themselves and have a strong influence over the national government via the Rajya Sabha. However, the Constitution does provide key limits on their powers and gives final say in many cases to the national government.

=== State powers in the Constitution ===
==== Rajya Sabha ====
At the Union level, the states are represented in the Rajya Sabha or Council of States. The Fourth Schedule of the Constitution lays out the number of seats that each state controls in the Council of States, and they are based roughly on each state's population. The members of each state legislature elect and appoint these representatives in the Council of States. On most topics the Rajya Sabha is coequal with the lower house or Lok Sabha, and its consent is required for a bill to become a law. Additionally, as one of the Houses of Parliament, any amendment to the Constitution requires a two-thirds majority in the Rajya Sabha to go into effect. These provisions allow the states significant impact on national politics through their representation in the "federal chamber".

==== State List ====
The Constitution provides the states with a long list of powers exclusive to their jurisdiction. Generally only state legislatures are capable of passing laws implementing these powers; the Union government is prohibited from doing so. These powers are contained in the second list of the Seventh Schedule of the Constitution, known as the State List. The areas on the State List are wide-ranging and include topics like public health and order and a variety of taxes. The State List grants the states control over the police, healthcare, agriculture, elections, and more.

Powers can only be permanently removed from the State List via a constitutional amendment approved by a majority of the states. The Rajya Sabha, as the representative of the states, can temporarily remove an item from the State List so the Union parliament can legislate on it. This requires a two-thirds vote and lasts for a renewable one-year period.

==== Amendments ====
In addition to exerting influence over the amendment process via the Rajya Sabha, the states are sometimes involved in the amendment process. This special, entrenched process is triggered when an amendment to the Constitution specifically concerns the states by modifying the legislature or the powers reserved to the states in the Seventh Schedule. When this occurs, an amendment must be ratified by a majority of state legislatures for the amendment to go into effect.

=== Limitations on state powers ===
==== Union and Concurrent Lists ====
While the State List mentioned above provides powers for the states, there are two other lists in the Seventh Schedule that generally weaken them. These are the Union and Concurrent lists. The Union List is the counterpart to the State List, containing the areas of exclusive jurisdiction of the Union government, where the states are prohibited from legislating. Items on the Union List include the national defense, international relations, immigration, banking, and interstate commerce.

The final list is the Concurrent List which contains the topics on which both the Union and state-level governments may legislate on. These topics include courts and criminal law, unions, social security, and education. In general, when the Union and state laws on a Concurrent List item conflict, the Union-level laws prevail. The only way for the state-level law to override the national one is with the consent of the president, acting on the advice of the prime minister.

Additionally, any powers not on any of the three lists are reserved for the Union government and not for the states.

==== Appointment of governors ====
The governor of each state is given the executive power of the respective state by the Constitution. These governors are appointed directly by the president of the central government. Because the prime minister acts via the president, the prime minister is the one who chooses the governors in practice. Once appointed, a governor serves for a five-year term or can be replaced by the president at any time, if asked to do so by the prime minister. Because the Union government can remove a governor at any time, it is possible that governors may act in a way the Union Government wants, to the detriment of their state, so that they can maintain their office. This has become a larger issue as the state legislatures are often controlled by different parties than that of the Union prime minister, unlike the early years of the constitution. For example, governors have used stalling tactics to delay giving their assent to legislation that the Union Government disapproves of.

In general the influence of the Union on state politics via the governor is limited, however, by the fact that the governor must listen to the advice of the chief minister of the state who needs to command a majority in the state legislature. There are key areas where the governor does not need to heed the advice of the chief minister. For example, the governor can send a bill to president for consideration instead of signing it into law.

==== Creation of states ====
Perhaps the most direct power over the states is the Union's ability to unilaterally create new states out of territories or existing states and to modify and diminish the boundaries of existing states. To do so, Parliament must pass a simple law with no supermajority requirements. The states involved do not have a say on the outcome but the state legislature must be asked to comment. The most recent state to be created was Telangana in 2014. More recently, Ladakh was created as a new Union Territory after being split off from Jammu and Kashmir in 2019, and Daman and Diu and Dadra and Nagar Haveli were combined into a single Union Territory in 2020.

=== Federalism and the courts ===
While the states have separate legislative and executive branches, they share the judiciary with the Union government. This is different from other federal court systems, such as the United States, where state courts mainly apply state law and federal courts mainly apply federal law. Under the Indian constitution, the High Courts of the States are directly constituted by the national constitution. The constitution also allows states to set up lower courts under and controlled by the state's High Court. Cases heard at or appealed to the High Courts can be furter appealed to the Supreme Court of India in some cases. All cases, whether dealing with federal or state laws, move up the same judicial hierarchy, creating a system sometimes termed integrated federalism.

== International law ==
The Constitution includes treaty making as part of the executive power given to the president. Because the president must act in accordance with the advice of the Council of Ministers, the prime minister is the chief party responsible for making international treaties in the Constitution. Because the legislative power rests with Parliament, the president's signature on an international agreement does not bring it into effect domestically or enable courts to enforce its provisions. Article 253 of the Constitution bestows this power on Parliament, enabling it to make laws necessary for implementing international agreements and treaties. These provisions indicate that the Constitution of India is dualist, that is, treaty law only takes effect when a domestic law passed using the normal processes incorporates it into domestic law.

Recent Supreme Court decisions have begun to change this convention, incorporating aspects of international law without enabling legislation from parliament. For example, in Gramophone Company of India Ltd. v Birendra Bahadur Pandey, the Court held that "the rules of international law are incorporated into national law and considered to be part of the national law, unless they are in conflict with an Act of Parliament." In essence, this implies that international law applies domestically unless parliament says it does not. This decision moves the Indian Constitution to a more hybrid regime, but not to a fully monist one.

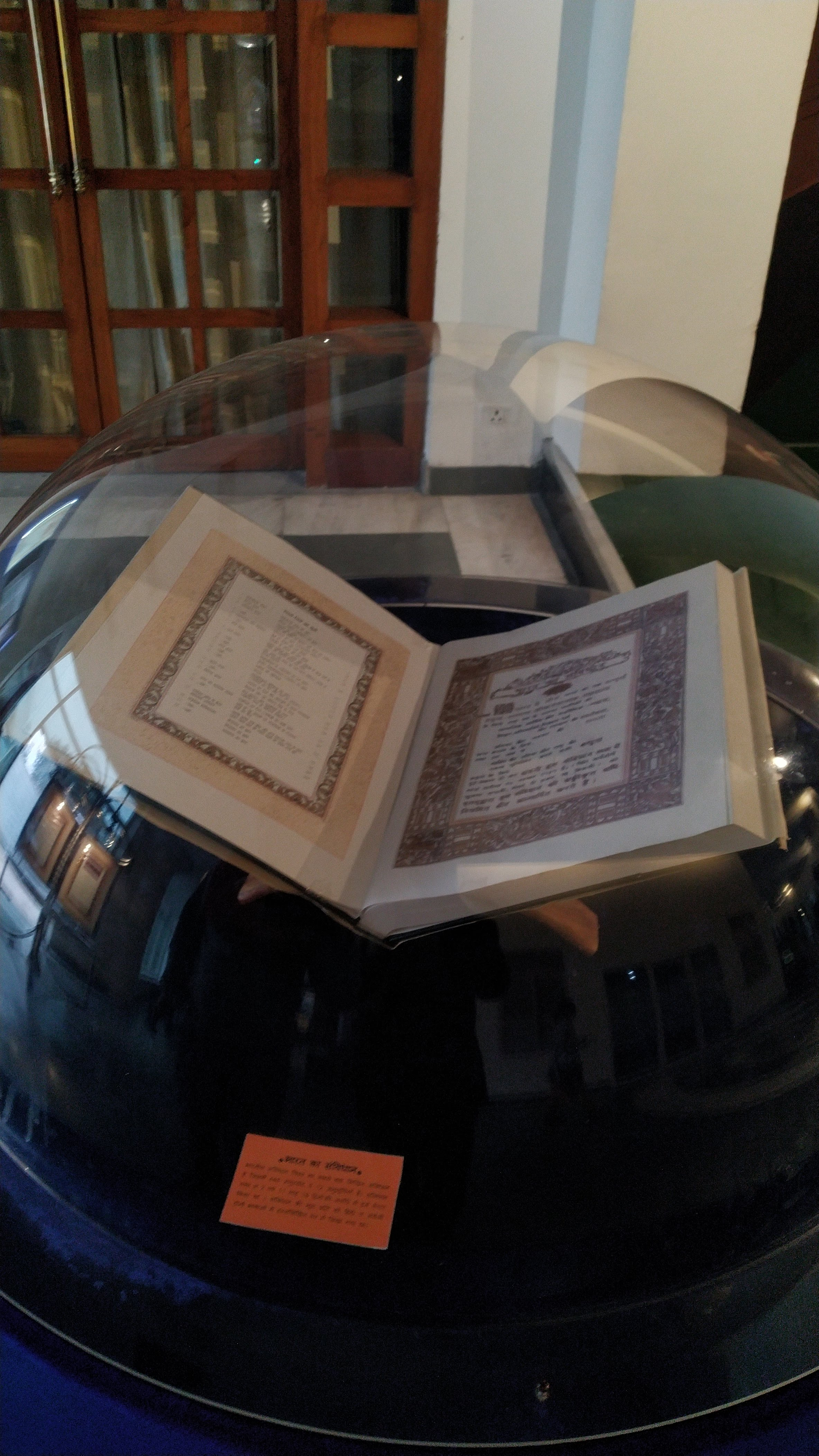
The Constitution on display in Rashtrapati Bhavan Museum

== Flexibility ==
According to American historian Granville Austin, "The Indian constitution is first and foremost a social document, and is aided by its Parts III & IV (Fundamental Rights & Directive Principles of State Policy, respectively) acting together, as its chief instruments and its conscience, in realising the goals set by it for all the people." (Note: These lines by Granville Austin from his book The Indian Constitution: Cornerstone of a Nation at p. 50, have been authoritatively quoted many times) The constitution has deliberately been worded in generalities (not in vague terms) to ensure its flexibility. John Marshall, the fourth chief justice of the United States, said that a constitution's "great outlines should be marked, its important objects designated, and the minor ingredients which compose those objects be deduced from the nature of the objects themselves." A document "intended to endure for ages to come", it must be interpreted not only based on the intention and understanding of its framers, but in the existing social and political context.

The "right to life" guaranteed under Article 21 (Note: Art. 21 – "No person shall be deprived of his life or personal liberty except according to procedure established by law") has been expanded to include a number of human rights, including:

- the right to a speedy trial;
- the right to water;
- the right to earn a livelihood,
- the right to health, and
- the right to education.

At the conclusion of his book, Making of India's Constitution, retired Supreme Court Justice Hans Raj Khanna wrote:

If the Indian constitution is our heritage bequeathed to us by our founding fathers, no less are we, the people of India, the trustees and custodians of the values which pulsate within its provisions! A constitution is not a parchment of paper, it is a way of life and has to be lived up to. Eternal vigilance is the price of liberty and in the final analysis, its only keepers are the people.

Whereas scholars such as Arghya Sengupta have written about the colonial legacy and transformative potential of the Indian Constitution, most recently in his book The Colonial Constitution (Juggernaut, 2023).

== Translations into Indian languages ==
The Constitution of India is translated into only a few of the 22 scheduled languages of the Indian Republic.

=== Hindi translation ===
The Hindi translation of the Indian Constitution is notably the first translation among Indian languages. This task was undertaken by Raghu Vira, a distinguished linguist, scholar, politician, and member of the Constituent Assembly.

In 1948, nearly two years after the formation of the Constituent Assembly, Rajendra Prasad entrusted Raghu Vira and his team to translate the English text of the Constitution into Hindi. Raghu Vira, using Sanskrit as a common base akin to the role of Latin in European languages, applied the rules of sandhi (joining), samasa (compounding), upasarga (prefix), and pratyaya (suffix) to develop several new terms for scientific and parliamentary use. The terminology was subsequently approved by an All India Committee of Linguistic Experts, representing thirteen languages: Sanskrit, Tamil, Telugu, Malayalam, Odia (then spelled as Oriya), Assamese, Gujarati, Hindi, Kannada, Marathi, Punjabi, Kashmiri, and Urdu. The vocabulary developed for Hindi later served as a base for translating the constitution into several other Indic languages.

=== Bengali translation ===
The Constitution of India was first translated from English into Bengali language and published in 1983, as ভারতের সংবিধান (romanised: "Bharoter Songbidhan") in Kolkata, through the collective efforts of the Government of West Bengal and the Union Government of India. Its second edition was published in 1987, and third in 2022. It contains up to the One hundred and fifth Amendment of the Constitution.

=== Meitei translation ===
The Constitution of India was first translated from English into Meitei language (officially known as Manipuri language) and published on 3 January 2019, as ভারতকী সংবিধান, in Imphal, through the collective efforts of the Government of Manipur and the Union Government of India. It was written in Bengali script. It contains up to the Ninety-fifth Amendment of the Constitution. The translation project was started in 2016 by the Directorate of Printing & Stationery of the Government of Manipur.

On 19 November 2023, Nongthombam Biren Singh, the then chief minister of Manipur declared that it will be transliterated into Meetei Mayek (Meitei for 'Meitei script') in digital edition.

On 26 November 2023, Nongthombam Biren Singh, the then chief minister of the Government of Manipur, officially released the diglot edition of the Constitution of India, in the Meetei Mayek (Meitei for 'Meitei writing system') in Manipuri language and English, at the Cabinet hall of the CM Secretariat in Imphal, as part of the Constitution Day celebrations (National Law Day) of the Republic of India, containing up to the 105th Amendment of the Constitution, for the first time in its history. It was made to be available in all educational institutions, government offices, and public libraries across the Manipur state.

=== Odia translation ===
The Constitution of India was first translated from English into Odia language and published on 1 April 1981, as ଭାରତର ସମ୍ବିଧାନ (romanised: "Bharatara Sambidhana") in Bhubaneswar, through the collective efforts of the Government of Odisha and the Union Government of India.

=== Sanskrit translation ===
The Constitution of India was first translated from English into Sanskrit language and published on 1 April 1985, as भारतस्य संविधानम् (romanised: "Bhartasya Samvidhanam") in New Delhi.

=== Tamil translation ===
The 4th edition of Constitution of India in Tamil language was published in 2021, as இந்திய அரசியலமைப்பு (romanised: "Intiya araciyalamaippu") in Chennai, through the collective efforts of the Government of Tamil Nadu and the Union Government of India. It contains up to the One hundred and fifth Amendment of the Constitution.

=== Maithili translation ===
In the year 2010, Maithili Sahitya Sansthan secretary Bhairava Lal Das published a Maithili version of the Indian Constitution by his own self. Similarly on 26 November 2024 during the occasion of the Constitution Day, the president of India officially launched the Maithili version of the Indian Constitution.

=== Kashmiri translation ===
In November 2025, the Constitution of India was translated into the Kashmiri language. The official translation was prepared by a team from the University of Kashmir under the Ministry of Law and Justice, Government of India, and carried out through the Central Institute of Indian Languages (CIIL), Mysore. The project began in September 2023 and was completed in March 2025. It was coordinated by Professor Aejaz Mohammad Sheikh, who served as the lead translator and linguist. The Kashmiri translation was formally released on Constitution Day (27 November 2025) by Droupadi Murmu in New Delhi, along with translations in other Indian languages, including Malayalam, Marathi, Nepali, Punjabi, Bodo, Telugu and Assamese. According to official sources, the Kashmiri version aims to improve access to constitutional texts for Kashmiri-speaking citizens and is available through the Legislative Department of the Government of India.

== See also ==
- Constitution Day (India)
- Constitutional economics
- Constitutionalism
- Democracy in India
- List of national constitutions
- Loiyumpa Silyel
- Magna Carta
- Rule according to higher law
- Uniform Civil Code

Comparable acts governing ex-Dominion status

- Australia Act 1986
- Canada Act 1982
- Constitution of Ireland
- New Zealand Constitution Act 1986
- 1956 Constitution of Pakistan
- Sri Lankan Constitution of 1972
- Status of the Union Act, 1934 and South African Constitution of 1961
