= Maithili version of Indian Constitution =

Translation of Indian Constitution in Maithili language

Bhaarataka Samvidhan (Maithili version of Indian Constitution)
- Original title: भारतक संविधान
- Language: Maithili
- Subject: Indian Constitution
- Genre: Translation of Indian Constitution in Maithili language
- Publisher: Government of India
- Publication date: November 26, 2024
- Publication place: New Delhi
- Inaugurated by - Droupadi Murmu (President of India)

The Maithili version of the Indian Constitution called Bhaarataka Samvidhan is the translation of the Indian Constitution in the native language Maithili of the Mithila region in the Indian subcontinent.

== History ==
The official Maithili version of the Indian Constitution was launched by the president of India Droupadi Murmu on 26 November 2024 during the occasion of Constitution Day in the National capital New Delhi. It was launched in the presence of the prime minister Narendra Modi, the opposition leader Rahul Gandhi and some other prominent leaders of the country.

In the year 2020, translator Shambhu Kumar Singh translated the book "The Indian Constitution: Cornerstone of a Nation by Granville Austin" into Maithili language. The translation was published by the Central Institute of Indian Languages in the form of book "Maithili translation of The Indian Constitution: Cornerstone of a Nation by Granville Austin".

The official translation of the Indian Constitution into Maithili was carried through the National Translation Mission of the Indian Language Institute, Mysore which is controlled by the Ministry of Education, Government of India. The National Translation Mission conducted several seminars and workshops at different educational institutions in the state of Bihar to prepare the official translation of the Indian Constitution in Maithili language. In 2024, the National Translation Mission conducted 10 days seminar at the campus of East and West Teachers Training College, Saharsa of the Bhupendra Narayan Mandal University. In the final stage of the translation, the National Translation Mission conducted 11 days seminar and workshop at the campus of Anugrah Narayan College in the Bihar state capital city Patna from 7 August 2024 to 17 August 2024 in which scholars like professor Ashok Kumar Mehta of Lalit Narayan Mithila University and professor Keshkar Thakur of Bhagalpur University participated as the subject specialists.

In the year 2010, Maithili Sahitya Sansthan secretary Bhairava Lal Das also published the Maithili translation of the Indian Constitution from his own self. Similarly on 24 June 2013, a translation of the Indian Constitution in Maithili language translated jointly by Nityanand Lal Das and Bhairava Lal Das was released by the principal secretary Vijay Prakash of the planning department at the auditorium of the Bihar Research Society.
