= Emergency provisions of the Constitution of India =

Emergency Provisions are contained in Part Eighteen of the Constitution of India. The President of India has the power to impose emergency rule in any or all the Indian states if the security of part or all of India is threatened by "war or external aggression or armed rebellion".

== 1971 ==
The Fifth Assembly was constituted on 15 March 1971 after the General Elections held in March 1971. It consisted of 234 elected members of which 42 seats were reserved for Scheduled Castes and 2 for Scheduled Tribes besides one nominated member. Before the expiry of the period of the Assembly, the President by a Proclamation issued on 31 January 1976, under article 356 of the Constitution, dissolved the Fifth Assembly and imposed President's Rule for the first time in Tamil Nadu.

Dissolved Date	Legislative Assembly	Prime Minister	Central Ruling Party	President	State	Chief Minister	State Ruling Party
31 January 1976	Fifth	Indira Gandhi	Indian National Congress	Fakhruddin Ali Ahmed	Tamil Nadu	M. Karunanidhi	DMK

== 1985 ==
The Eighth Assembly was constituted on 16 January 1985 after the General Elections held on 24 December 1984. Before the expiry of the period of Assembly, the President by a proclamation issued on 30 January 1988, under Article 356 of the Constitution dissolved the Eighth Tamil Nadu Legislative Assembly and imposed President's Rule in Tamil Nadu.

Dissolved Date	Legislative Assembly	Prime Minister	Central Ruling Party	President	State	Chief Minister	State Ruling Party
30 January 1988	Eighth	Rajiv Gandhi	Indian National Congress	Ramaswamy Venkataraman	Tamil Nadu	Janaki Ramachandran	AIADMK

== 1989 ==
The Ninth Tamil Nadu Legislative Assembly was constituted on 27 January 1989 after the General Elections held on 21 January 1989. Before the expiry of the term of the Assembly, the President by a Proclamation issued on 30 January 1991, under Article 356 of the Constitution of India dissolved the Ninth Tamil Nadu Legislative Assembly and imposed President's Rule in Tamil Nadu.

Dissolved Date	Legislative Assembly	Prime Minister	Central Ruling Party	President	State	Chief Minister	State Ruling Party
30 January 1991	Ninth	Chandra Shekhar Singh	Samajwadi Janata Party	Ramaswamy Venkataraman	Tamil Nadu	M. Karunanidhi	DMK

Final Table

Dissolved Date	Legislative Assembly	Prime Minister	Central Ruling Party	President	State	Chief Minister	State Ruling Party
17 Feb 1968	Sixth	Indira Gandhi	Indian National Congress	Zakir Hussain	Uttar Pradesh	Charan Singh	Bharatiya Lok Dal
2 Oct 1970	Eighth	Indira Gandhi	Indian National Congress	Varahagiri Venkata Giri	Uttar Pradesh	Charan Singh	Bharatiya Lok Dal
12 Jun 1973	Tenth	Indira Gandhi	Indian National Congress	Varahagiri Venkata Giri	Uttar Pradesh	Kamalapathi Tripathi	Indian National Congress
30 Nov 1975	Eleventh	Indira Gandhi	Indian National Congress	Fakhruddin Ali Ahmed	Uttar Pradesh	Hemwati Nandan Bahuguna	Indian National Congress
30 Apr 1977	Twelfth	Morarji Desai	Janata Party	Basappa Danappa Jatti	Uttar Pradesh	Narayan Dutt Tiwari	Indian National Congress
17 Feb 1980	Fourteenth	Indira Gandhi	Indian National Congress	Neelam Sanjiva Reddy	Uttar Pradesh	Banarsi Das	Janata Party
6 Dec 1992	Twenty first	P. V. Narasimha Rao	Indian National Congress	Shankar Dayal Sharma	Uttar Pradesh	Kalyan Singh	Bharatiya Janata Party
18 Oct 1995	Twenty third	P. V. Narasimha Rao	Indian National Congress	Shankar Dayal Sharma	Uttar Pradesh	Mayawati	Bahujan Samaj Party
8 Mar 2002	Twenty ninth	Atal Bihari Vajpayee	Bharatiya Janata Party	Kocheril Raman Narayanan	Uttar Pradesh	Rajnath Singh	Bharatiya Janata Party
10 January 1973	Fourth	Indira Gandhi	Indian National Congress	Varahagiri Venkata Giri	Andhra Pradesh	Pamulaparthi Venkata Narasimha Rao	Indian National Congress
20 February 1968	Fifth	Indira Gandhi	Indian National Congress	Zakir Hussain	West Bengal	Prafulla Chandra Ghosh	Nonparty in Progressive Democratic Alliance Front
19 March 1970	Sixth	Indira Gandhi	Indian National Congress	Varahagiri Venkata Giri	West Bengal	Ajoy Kumar Mukherjee	Bangla Congress in United Front
28 June 1971	Seventh	Indira Gandhi	Indian National Congress	Varahagiri Venkata Giri	West Bengal	Ajoy Kumar Mukherjee	Indian National Congress in coalition
31 January 1976	Fifth	Indira Gandhi	Indian National Congress	Fakhruddin Ali Ahmed	Tamil Nadu	M. Karunanidhi	DMK
30 January 1988	Eighth	Rajiv Gandhi	Indian National Congress	Ramaswamy Venkataraman	Tamil Nadu	V. N. Janaki Ramachandran	AIADMK
30 January 1991	Ninth	Chandra Shekhar Singh	Samajwadi Janata Party	Ramaswamy Venkataraman	Tamil Nadu	M. Karunanidhi	DMK

== See also ==
- Constitution of India
- President of India
- State of Emergency in India
- The Emergency (India)
