= Preamble to the Constitution of India =

Set of guidelines to the nation and the Constitution of India

The Preamble to the Constitution of the Republic of India is based on the Objectives Resolution, which was moved in the Constituent Assembly by Jawaharlal Nehru on 13 December 1946, accepted on 22 January 1947 and adopted by the Constituent Assembly on 26 November 1949, coming into force on 26 January 1950, celebrated as the Republic Day of India, and was initially drafted by Jawaharlal Nehru. The words "socialist", "secular" and "integrity" were later added during the Indian Emergency by the then Prime Minister Indira Gandhi.

== Preamble ==
The preamble to the Constitution of India

The Constitution of India's preamble, as amended up to July 2026, reads as follows:

WE, THE PEOPLE OF INDIA, having solemnly resolved to constitute India into a SOVEREIGN SOCIALIST SECULAR DEMOCRATIC REPUBLIC and to secure to all its citizens:

JUSTICE, social, economic and political;

LIBERTY of thought, expression, belief, faith and worship;

EQUALITY of status and of opportunity; and to promote among them all

FRATERNITY assuring the dignity of the individual and the unity and integrity of the Nation;

IN OUR CONSTITUENT ASSEMBLY this twenty-sixth day of November, 1949, do HEREBY ADOPT, ENACT AND GIVE TO OURSELVES THIS CONSTITUTION.

== Historical background ==
The preamble is based on the Objectives Resolution, which was moved in the Constituent Assembly by Jawaharlal Nehru on 13 December 1946 accepted on 22 January 1947 and adopted by the Constituent Assembly on 26 November 1949, coming into force on 26 January 1950. B. R. Ambedkar said about the preamble:

It was, indeed, a way of life, which recognizes liberty, equality, and fraternity as the principles of life and which cannot be divorced from each other: Liberty cannot be divorced from equality; equality cannot be divorced from liberty. Nor can liberty and equality be divorced from fraternity. Without equality, liberty would produce the supremacy of the few over the many. Equality without liberty would kill individual initiative. Without fraternity, liberty and equality could not become a natural course of things.

While the Constituent Assembly was debating the Preamble, there was an argument to rename India the 'Union of Indian Socialistic Republics' as if India was to imitate the U.S.S.R. However, other members were not convinced.

There was even an argument as to whether to include the names of 'God' and 'Gandhi' in the Preamble. The former was outvoted when 68 members voted against 'God'. Hari Vishnu Kamath desperately commented, 'This, Sir, is a black day in our annals. God save India'. While the latter – the suggestion to include Gandhi's name, was disapproved by Brajeshwar Prasad who felt that the 'rotten constitution' – which was based on the American Supreme Court cases and Government of India Act and thus not 'Gandhian' in nature, should not carry his name. Prasad said,

"I do not want that the name of Mahatma Gandhi should be incorporated in this Constitution, because it is not a Gandhian Constitution.... If we had a Gandhian Constitution, I would have been the first to offer my support. I do not want that the name of Mahatma Gandhi should be dragged in the rotten Constitution."

The preamble page, along with other pages of the original Constitution of India, was designed and decorated by the renowned painter Beohar Rammanohar Sinha of Jabalpur who was at Shantiniketan with Acharya Nandalal Bose at that time. Nandalal Bose endorsed Sinha's artwork without any alteration whatsoever. As such, the page bears Sinha's short signature Ram in Devanagari lower-right corner. The calligraphy was done by Prem Behari Narain Raizada.

== An integral part of the Indian constitution ==
The Supreme Court of India originally stated in the Berubari case presidential reference that the preamble is not an integral part of the Indian constitution, and therefore it is not enforceable in a court of law. However, the same court, in the 1973 Kesavananda case, over-ruled its earlier decisions and recognized that the preamble is part of the "Basic Structure" of the constitution and it may also be used to interpret ambiguous areas of the constitution where differing interpretations present themselves. In the 1995 case of Union Government vs LIC of India, the Supreme Court once again held that the Preamble is an integral part of the Constitution.

== Question of Amendability before emergency ==
In the Berubari Case (1960), the amendability & the significance of the constitution came into force. A question was raised relating to the powers of the Parliament to cede Indian territory to a foreign country, as an interpretation of Article 3. The Supreme Court had held that the power of Parliament to diminish the area of a state as guaranteed in article 3 of the Constitution does not cover cession of the Indian territory to a foreign country. Hence, Indian territory can be ceded to a foreign country only by means of amendment of the Constitution under the Article 368. Consequently, the 9th Constitutional Amendment Act, 1960 was enacted to transfer the Berubari Union to Bangladesh (erstwhile East Pakistan). Supreme Court also held the view that Preamble cannot be a part of the constitution but later in Kesavananda Bharati Case (1973), the Supreme Court gave a comprehensive verdict. It said that Preamble is part of the Constitution and is subject to the amending power of the parliament as are any other provisions of the Constitution, provided the basic structure of the Constitution is not destroyed.

It has been clarified by the Supreme Court of India that, being a part of the Constitution, the Preamble can be subjected to Constitutional Amendments exercised under article 368, however, the basic structure cannot be altered. Therefore, it is considered as the heart and soul of the Constitution.

== Amendments during Indian emergency ==
The preamble was amended only once on 18 December 1976. During the Emergency in India, the Indira Gandhi government pushed through several changes in the Forty-second Amendment of the constitution. Through this amendment, the words "socialist" and "secular" were added between the words "Sovereign" and "Democratic" and the words "unity of the Nation" were changed to "unity and integrity of the Nation".

In the year 1994, during the S. R. Bommai v. Union of India case, the Supreme Court of India held that secularism is a part of the basic structure doctrine.

== Objectives ==
=== Sovereign ===
Sovereign means the independent authority of a state—that it has the power to legislate on any subject; and that it is not subject to the control of any other state or external power.

According to the preamble, the constitution of India has been pursuance of the solemn resolution of the people of India to constitute India into a 'Sovereign Socialist Secular Democratic Republic', and to secure well-defined objects set forth in the preamble. Sovereignty denotes supreme and ultimate power. It may be real or normal, legal or political, individual or pluralistic.

Sovereignty, in short, means the independent authority of a state. It has two aspects- external and internal. External sovereignty means the independence of a state of the will of other states, in her conduct with other states in the committee of nations. The external sovereignty of India means that it can acquire foreign territory and also cede any part of the Indian territory, subject to limitations (if any) imposed by the constitution. On the other hand, internal sovereignty refers to the relationship between the states and the individuals within its territory. Internal sovereignty relates to internal and domestic affairs, and is divided into four organs, namely, the executive, the legislature, the judiciary and the administrative.

=== Socialist ===
The term "Socialist" was added by the 42nd Amendment in 1976. "Socialist" used here refers to social democracy, i.e. achievement of socialist goals through democratic, evolutionary and non-violent means. Essentially, it means that wealth should be shared equally by society through distributive justice, not concentrated in the hands of few, and that the government should regulate the ownership of land and industry to reduce socio-economic inequalities. B. R. Ambedkar, a politician and jurist opposed the inclusion of the term "Socialist" in the Preamble of the constitution on the grounds that the constitution should not prescribe a particular social and economic system to future generations. He argued that the people should remain free to determine the social and economic organizations of the nation through democratic processes, since such policies are subject to change according to the preferences and circumstances of succeeding generations. Secondly, he regarded the inclusion of the term to be superflous since the part IV of the Constitution, also known as, the Directive Principles of State Policy contained provisions which according to him are explicitly socialist in nature.

=== Secular ===
By the 42nd Amendment on 18 December 1976, the term "Secular" was also incorporated in the Preamble. There is no difference of religion i.e. Hinduism, Buddhism, Jainism, Sikhism, Christianity and Islam are equally respected and moreover, there is no state religion. All the citizens of India are allowed to profess, practice and propagate their religions.

=== Democratic ===
The people of India elect their governments by a system of universal adult franchise, popularly known as "one person one vote". This representative form of government is suitable for governing the country because of its huge and diverse population. Every citizen of India 18 years of age or older and not otherwise debarred by law is entitled to vote. In the case of Mohan Lal Tripathi vs District Magistrate, the term "Democracy" was discussed and it was held that:

"Democracy is a concept of political philosophy, an ideal which is practiced by many nations that are culturally advanced and politically mature via resorting to governance by representative of people directly or indirectly."

The word democratic refers not only to political democracy but also to social and economic democracy. The main reason to incorporate democracy is to provide freedom to the people to choose their own representative and to save them from tyrant rulers.

=== Republic ===
In a republican form of government, the head of state is elected and not a hereditary monarch. Thus, this word denotes a government where no one holds public power as a proprietary right. As opposed to a monarchy, in which the head of state is appointed on a hereditary basis for life or until abdication, a democratic republic is an entity in which the head of state is elected, directly or indirectly, for a fixed tenure. Thus, India has a president who is indirectly elected and has a fixed term of office. There is an absence of a privileged class and all public offices are open to every citizen without discrimination.

=== Justice ===
Justice stands for rule of law, absence of arbitrariness and a system of equal rights, freedom and opportunities for all in a society.

India seeks social, economic and political justice to ensure equality to its citizens.

(i) Social Justice:

Social Justice means the absence of socially privileged classes in the society and no discrimination against any citizen on grounds of caste, creed, colour, religion, gender or place of birth. India stands for eliminating all forms of exploitations from the society.

(ii) Economic Justice:

Economic Justice means no discrimination between man and woman on the basis of income, wealth and economic status. It stands for equitable distribution of wealth, economic equalities, the end of monopolistic control over means of production and distribution, decentralization of economic resources, and the securing of adequate opportunities to all for earning their living.

(iii) Political Justice:

Political justice means equal, free and fair opportunities to the people for participation in the political process. It stands for the grant of equal political rights to all the people without discrimination. The Constitution of India provides for a liberal democracy in which all the people have the right

and freedom to participate.

=== Liberty ===
The idea of Liberty refers to the freedom on the activities of Indian nationals. This establishes that there are no unreasonable restrictions on Indian citizens in term of what they think, their manner of expressions and the way they wish to follow up their thoughts in action. However, liberty does not mean freedom to do anything, and it must be exercised within the constitutional limits.

=== Equality ===
The term 'equality' means the absence of special privilege to any section of society, and the provision of adequate opportunity of all the individuals without any discrimination.

=== Fraternity ===
This refers to feeling of oneness and a sense of belonging with the country among its people.

The word "Fraternity" is derived from French word which declares that it has to assure two things—the dignity of the individual and the unity and integrity of the nation. The word 'integrity' has been added to the Preamble by the 42nd Constitutional Amendment (1976).
