= Revolutionary breach of legal continuity =

Legal revolution in common-law jurisdictions

Revolutionary breach of legal continuity is a concept in English constitutional law, which rationalises the historic English behavior when one King (or regime) was deposed and a de facto ruler was recognised as the new de jure monarch (or republican authority). More generally it is any process, unauthorised by an existing legal order, which results in the creation of a new legal order; whether or not the revolutionary change is brought about by violence. A technical breach of continuity might happen when the former constitutional arrangement is so inefficient that there is not even a practical legal way to amend it.

It is generally accepted that the most recent successful revolutionary breach in England and Wales, Scotland and Northern Ireland was the Glorious Revolution of 1688–1689 which replaced King James II of England and Ireland (King James VII of Scotland) with the joint sovereignty of his son-in-law King William III of England (King William II of Scotland) and daughter Queen Mary II of England (and Scotland). Sir William Wade considered the acceptance of the European Economic Community's law as normatively superior to English law by the Lords of Appeal in Ordinary in Factortame to constitute a revolutionary breach of legal continuity.

The United States Declaration of Independence is another example, as it had no basis in the previous legal order which had governed the Thirteen Colonies and represented the start of a new legal order. A few years later the replacement of the Articles of Confederation with the United States Constitution was a technical breach of continuity, which did not result in a civil war only because of the very reason of the breach: the United States under the Articles had a weak central government that therefore had no means to defend itself.

There was an attempted revolutionary breach in the whole of Ireland in 1919, when the First Dáil, a gathering of persons elected to the United Kingdom House of Commons in 1918, declared the Irish Republic, without any authority to do so within the terms of the United Kingdom's legal order. The subsequent Anglo-Irish Treaty and steps taken under it gave the Irish Free State legitimacy within the United Kingdom legal order, but they delegitimised it for those who regarded the applicable legal order to be that proclaimed in 1919.

When the present constitution of Ireland was adopted the amending formula of the Irish Free State constitution was deliberately not used, despite having the necessary support, so the new constitution would represent a revolutionary breach and derive its legitimacy from purely Irish sources.

Similar steps were taken so the Indian people became the source of legitimacy for the republican constitution of India. The republican constitution replaced the one authorised by the United Kingdom at the time of independence but did not comply with its provisions for amendments.

The term has also been applied to regime change following a military coup in Commonwealth of Nations members such as Pakistan and Nigeria.

== See also ==
- Convention Parliament
- Constitutional autochthony
