= Republic Day (India) =

National day of India

Republic Day of India
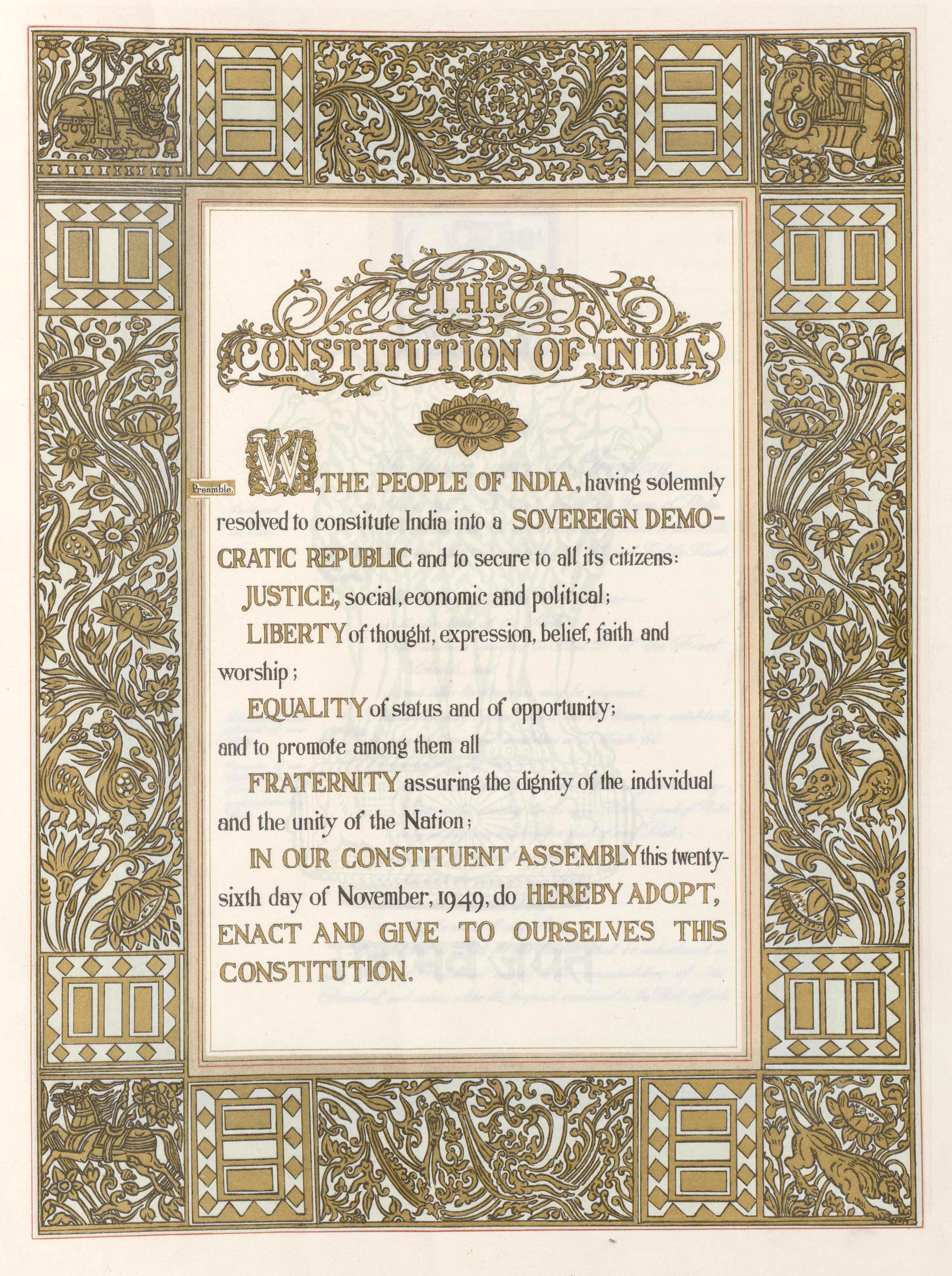
- The original text of the Preamble to the Constitution of India. The Constitution of India came into force on 26 January 1950.
- Observed by: Republic of India
- Type: Public
- Significance: Commemorates the adoption of India’s Constitution
- Celebrations: Parades, speeches and cultural events etc.
- Date: 26 January
- Next time: 26 January 2027
- Frequency: Annual
- First time: 26 January 1950 (76 years ago)

Republic Day is a national holiday in India commemorating the adoption of the Constitution of the Republic of India and the country's transition to a republic which came into effect on 26 January 1950.

The constitution replaced the Government of India Act 1935 as the governing document of India, thus turning the nation from a dominion into a republic, following its independence from the British Raj in 1947. The constitution was adopted by the Constituent Assembly of India on 26 November 1949 and came into effect on 26 January 1950. The date was chosen because the Indian National Congress had proclaimed Purna Swaraj (complete independence) on that date in 1930.

Republic Day is commonly associated with parades, political speeches, cultural events and ceremonies, in addition to various other public and private events celebrating the history, government, and the traditions of India.

== Background ==
India achieved independence from the British Raj on 15 August 1947 following the success of the Indian independence movement which was led by Indian National Congress. The Indian National Congress (INC) was the largest and, especially under Gandhi, the most influential organization in the final phase of the independence movement—but it was not the only organization or group that fought against British rule.

It is more accurate to view Indian independence as the result of many political movements, revolutionary groups, leaders, social organizations, workers, peasants, soldiers and ordinary citizens, with Congress playing the central mainstream role. This was enacted through the Indian Independence Act 1947, an act of the Parliament of the United Kingdom that partitioned British India into the two new independent dominions of the British Commonwealth. Without a standalone constitution, its laws were based on the Government of India Act 1935 and governed by the Constituent Assembly of India.

On 29 August 1947, a seven-member drafting committee was appointed to draft a permanent constitution. A draft constitution prepared by the committee was submitted to the Constituent Assembly on 4 November 1948. After the draft was discussed and debated, the constituent assembly adopted the constitution on 26 November 1949. The major part of the constitution came into effect on 26 January 1950 with Rajendra Prasad becoming the first President of India and the constituent assembly became the Parliament of India under the transitional provisions of the new constitution. The date was chosen as the Indian National Congress proclaimed Purna Swaraj (complete independence) on this day in 1930.

== Customs and celebrations ==
On the eve of Republic Day, the President of India addresses the nation. He/She unfurls the national flag in the national capital New Delhi with the Governors and Lieutenant Governors unfurling the flag at the respective states and union territories.

=== Parade ===
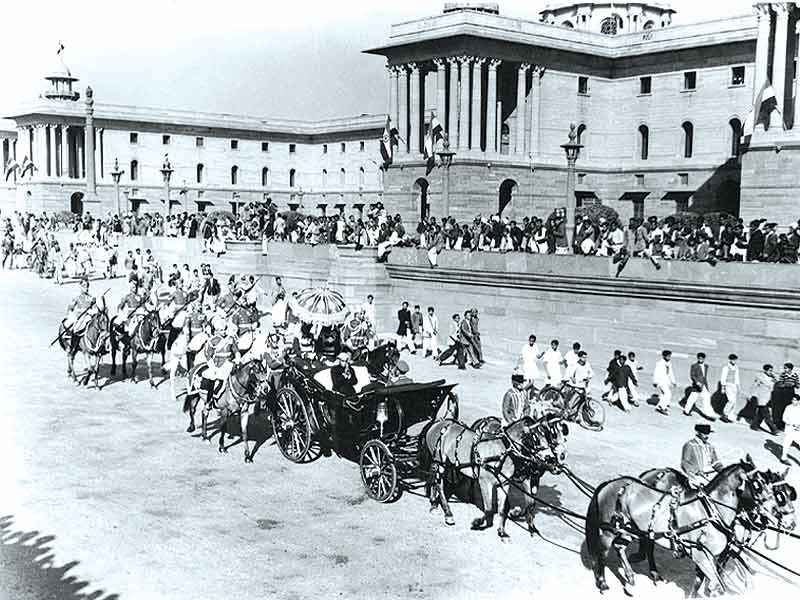
First president Rajendra Prasad readies to take part in the first Republic Day parade on Rajpath in New Delhi, in 1950

The main Republic Day celebrations are held in New Delhi, at the Kartavya Path, a ceremonial boulevard that runs from Rashtrapati Bhavan on Raisina Hill through India Gate. This event is hosted by the President of India with many ceremonious events like parades and cultural events. The Delhi Republic Day parade held during the same is organized by the Ministry of Defence. The President who is the Commander-in-Chief of the Indian Armed Forces, takes the salute from various units of the army, navy, air force, para-military and police forces.

=== Flypast ===
One of the most anticipated features of the Republic Day celebrations is the Indian Air Force flypast, which symbolically concludes the parade. The Indian Air Force’s Republic Day flypast has evolved dramatically since it first took shape. What began with Dakotas and Harvards has expanded to include formations of MiG-21s, Jaguars, Su-30MKIs, and Rafales. Special segments such as "Trishul," "Arrowhead," and "Brahmastra" formations reflect doctrinal and technological advancements. The flypast is now a highlight of the parade, often showcasing the IAF’s newest acquisitions and combat capabilities.

=== Chief-guest ===
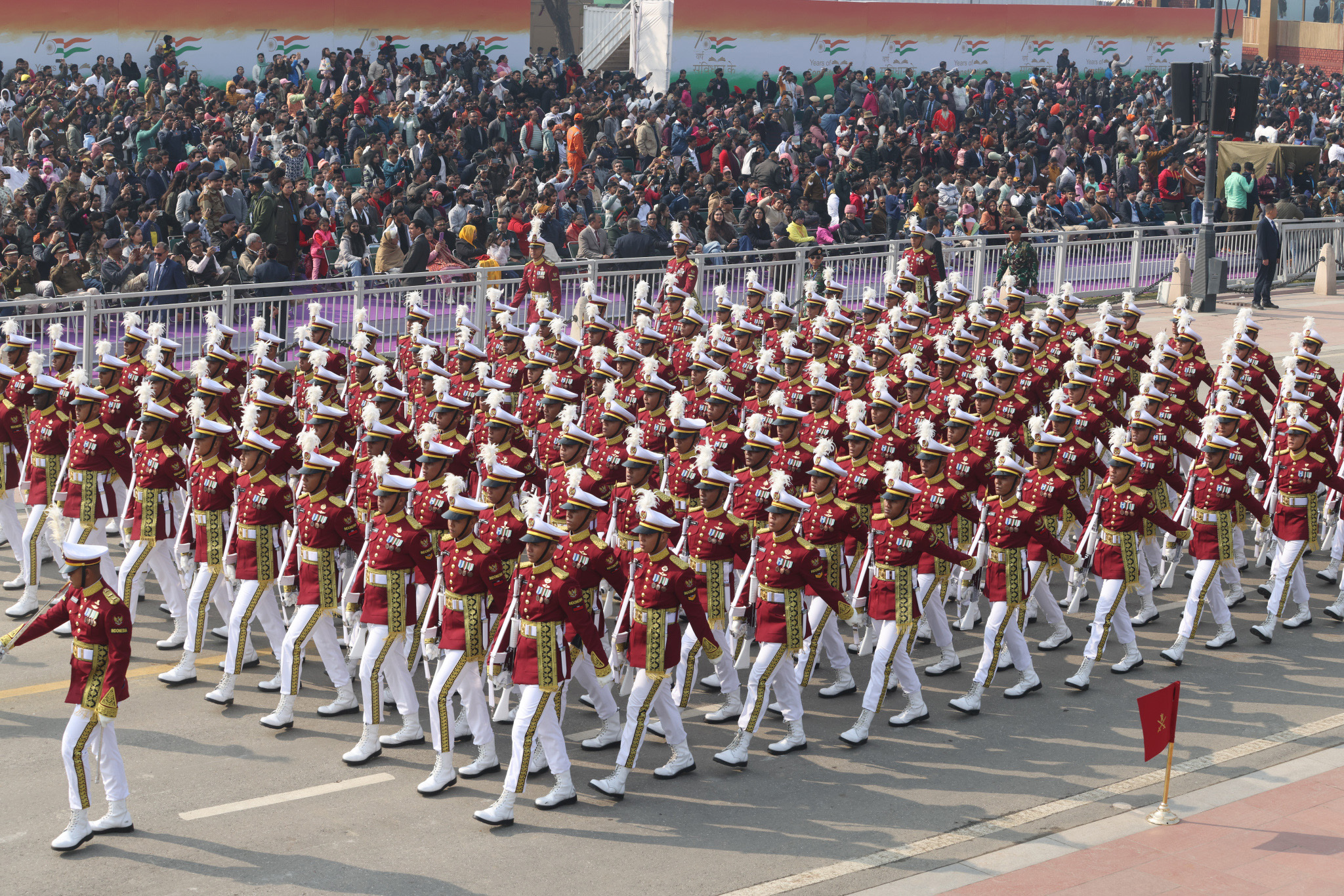
Indonesian marching contingent from the Republic Day Parade Rehearsal 2025

Every year, a head of state or government of another country is invited as the state guest of honor for the Republic Day celebrations in New Delhi. The guest country is often chosen on the basis of strategic, economic and political interests. French president Emmanuel Macron was the chief guest at the celebrations that marked India's 75th Republic Day. In 2026, President of the European Council, Antonio Costa and President of the European Commission, Ursula von der Leyen were the chief guests of the Republic Day Parade, marking the first time since 2018 when multiple chief guests were invited.

=== Beating retreat ===
The Beating Retreat ceremony, conducted on the evening of 29 January, marks the end of Republic Day festivities. It is performed by the bands of the three wings of the Indian armed forces at Vijay Chowk. The President of India is escorted by the President's Bodyguard and post a ceremonial salute, the Indian National Anthem, Jana Gana Mana is played. Military bands then play popular tunes like Abide With Me, Aye Mere Watan Ke Logo and Saare Jahan Se Achcha at the end.

=== Awards ===
On the eve of Republic Day, the President of India distributes various civilian Padma Awards. These were instituted in the year 1954 and are awarded in three categories in decreasing order of precedence:

- Padma Vibhushan is awarded for "exceptional and distinguished service" and is the second highest civilian honor
- Padma Bhushan is awarded for "distinguished service of a high order" and is the third highest civilian honor
- Padma Shri is awarded for "distinguished service" and is the fourth highest civilian honor

The decoration consists of a certificate and a medallion and, unlike national honors, the awards do not include cash allowances, benefits, or special concessions. A commemorative brochure giving out brief details in respect of each award winner is also released on the day of the investiture ceremony.

== Gallery ==
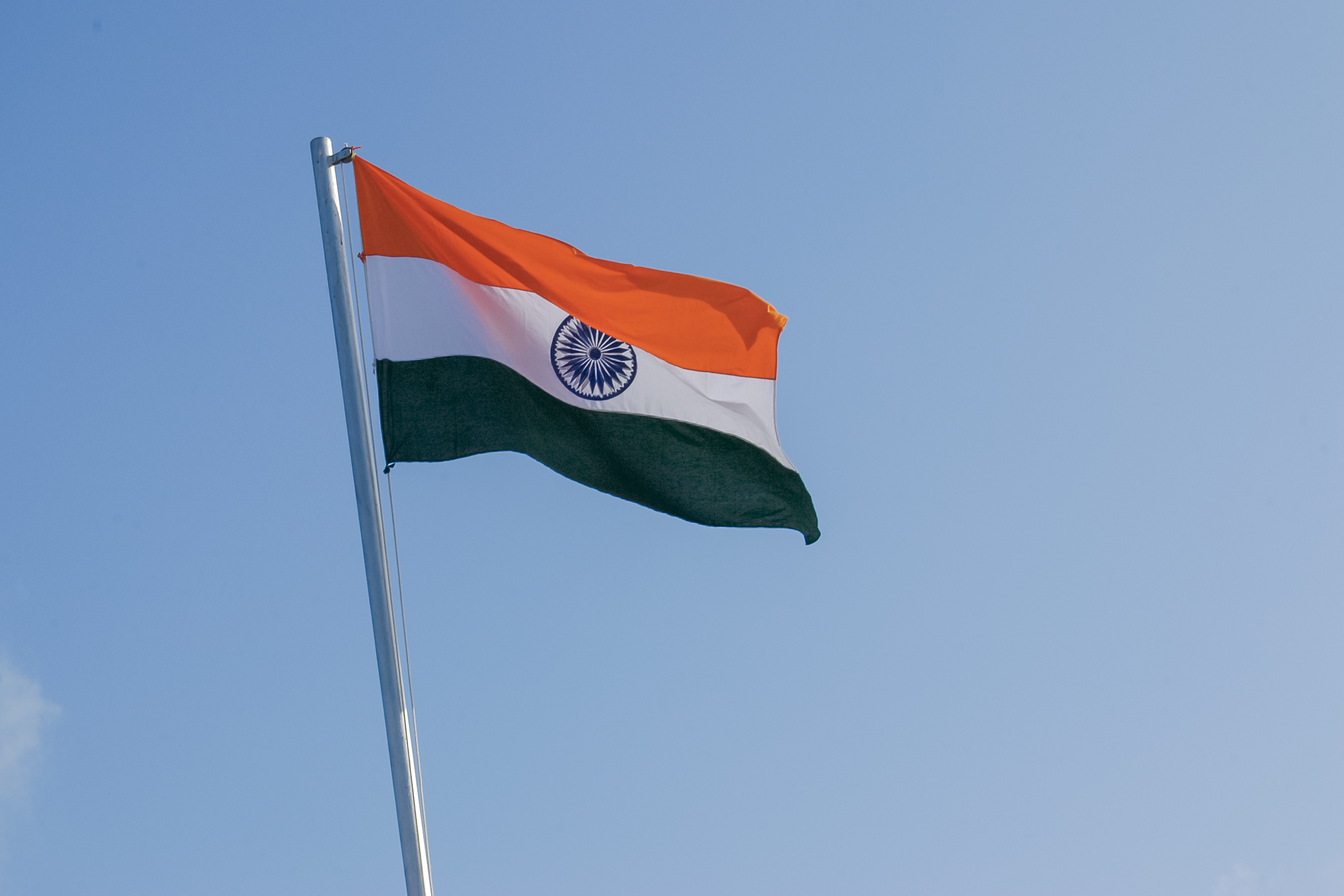
The Flag of India, unfurled by the President of India on the Republic Day

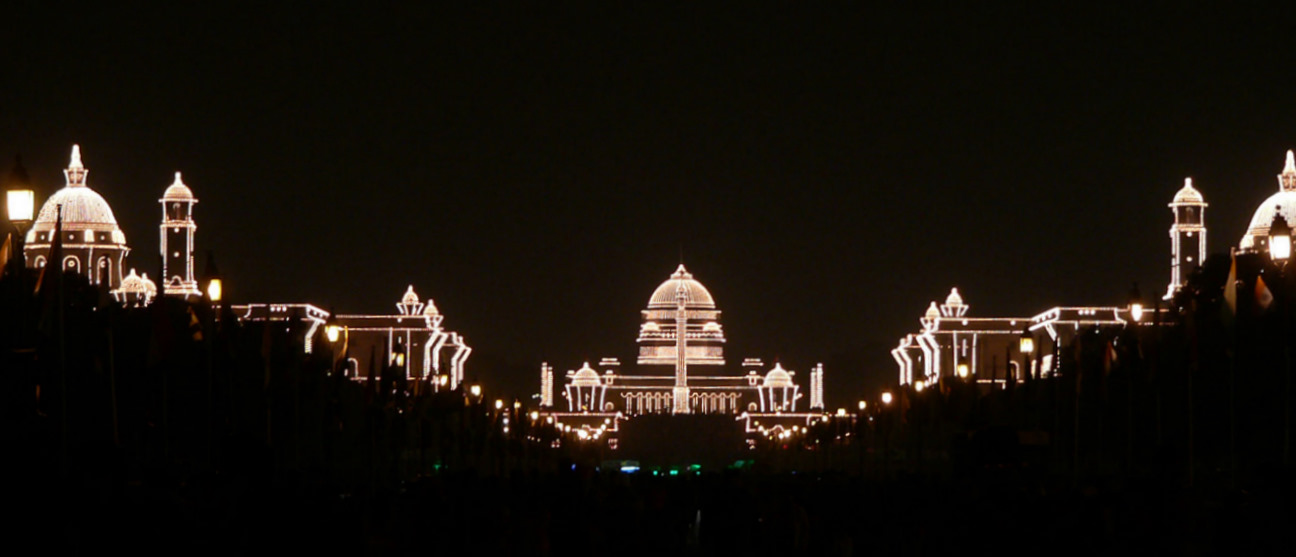
Buildings on Raisina Hill including Rashtrapati Bhavan, lit up during the Republic Day in 2008

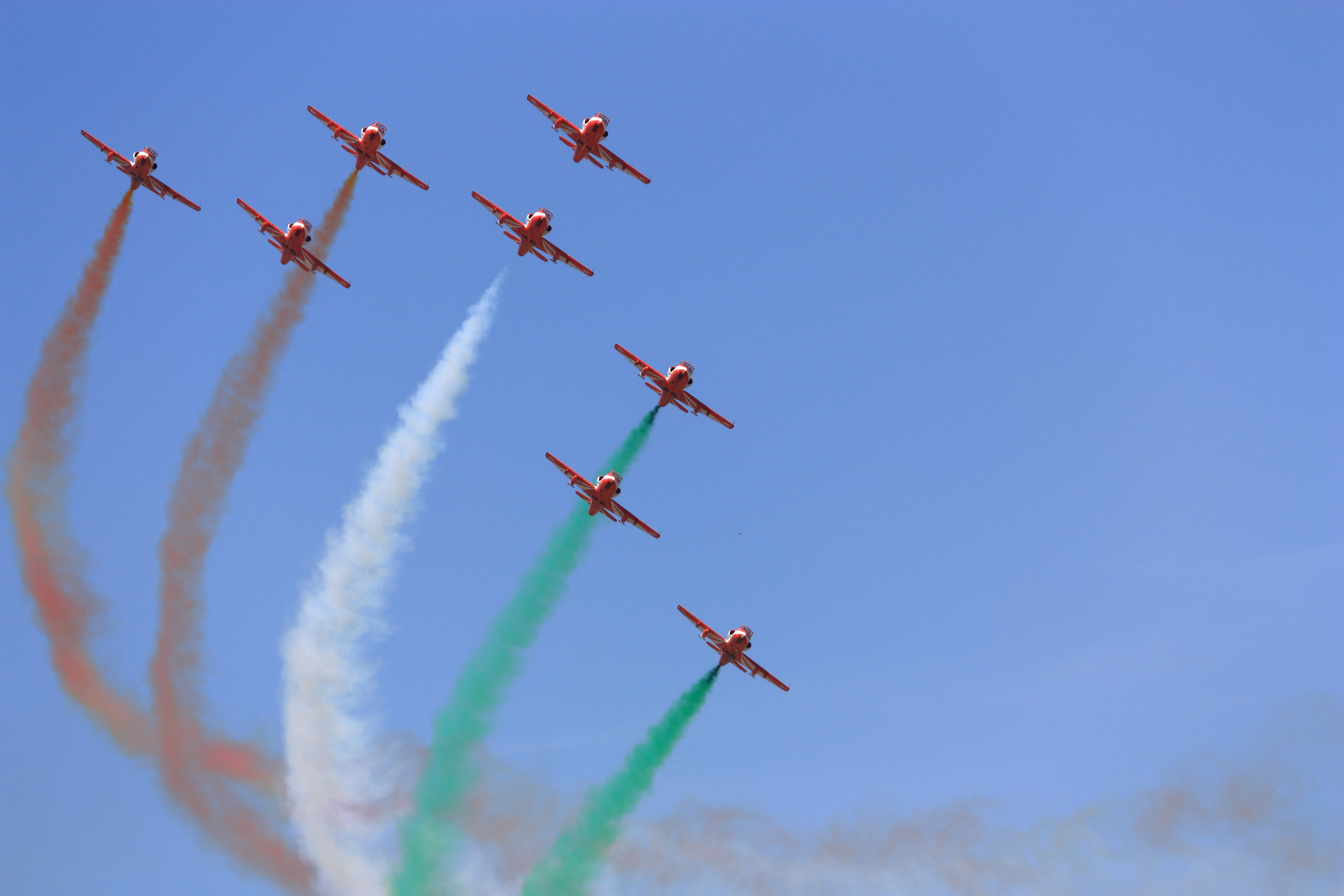
Surya Kiran Aerobatics Team of Indian Air Force performing on the Republic Day

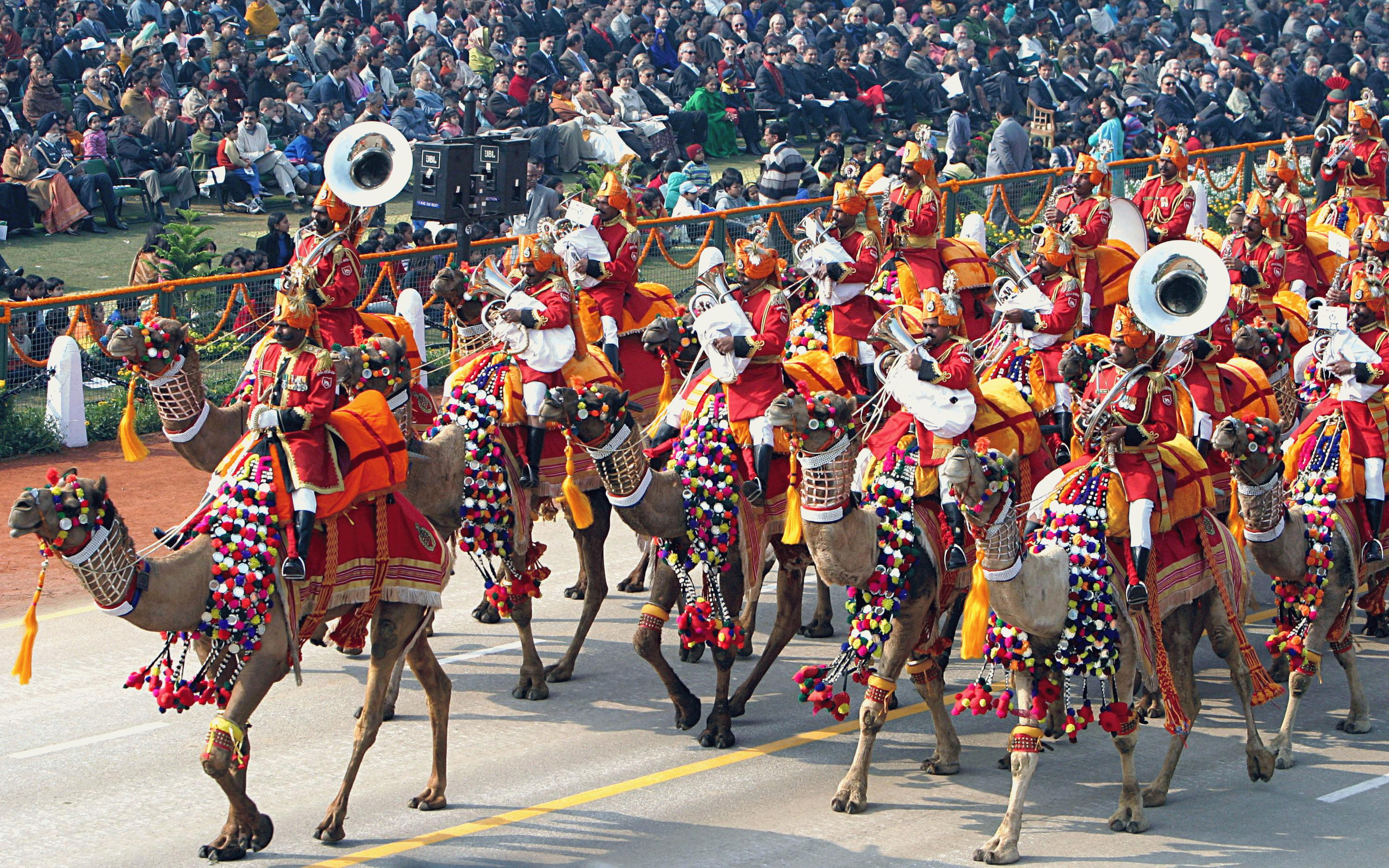
Border Security Force personnel on the Republic Day

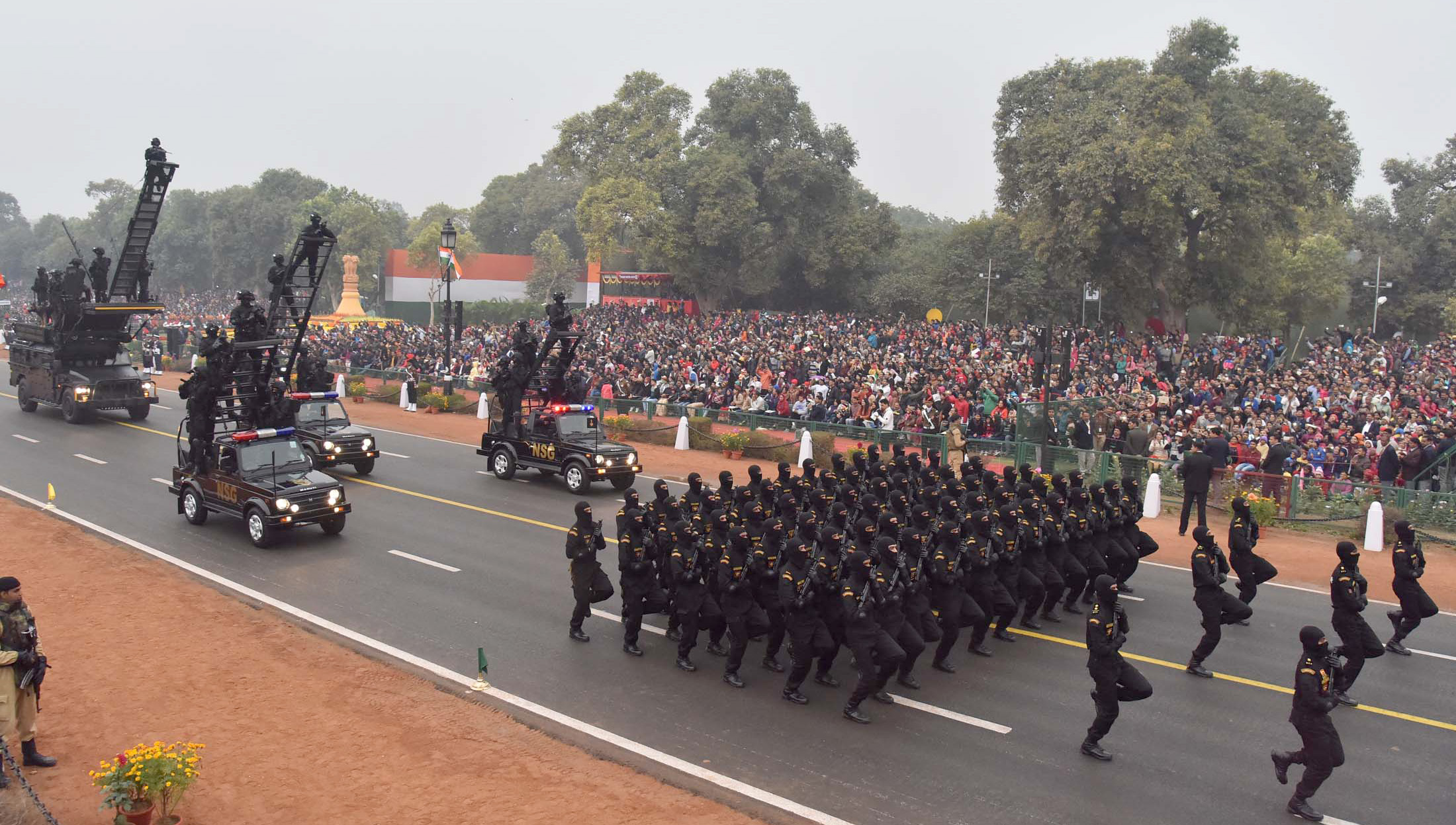
National Security Guard marching in the 2017 Republic Day parade

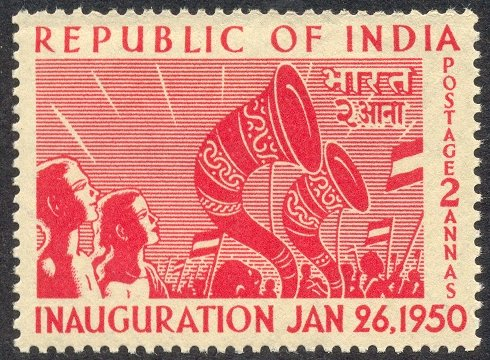
India Post stamp commemorating the Republic Day

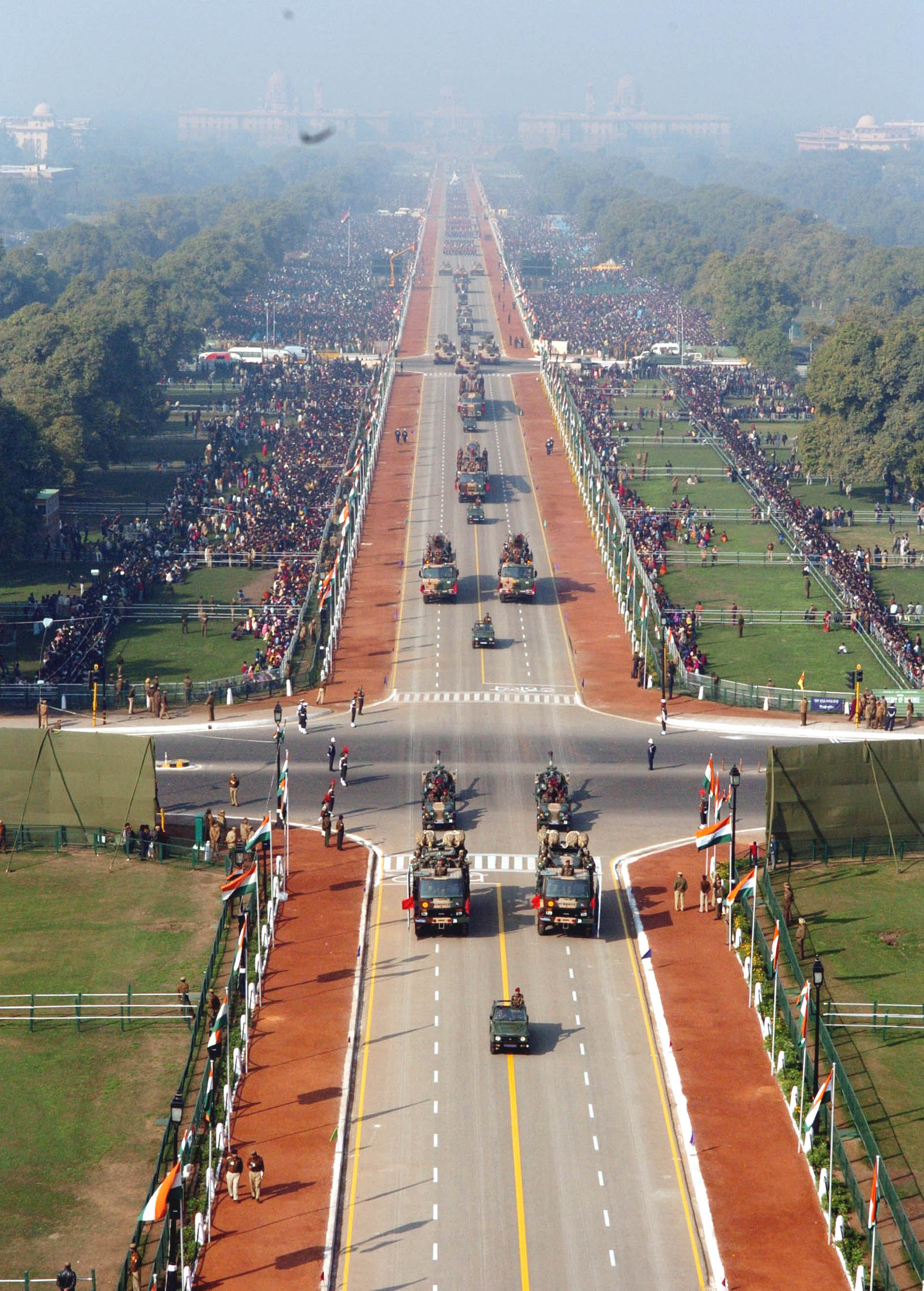
Aerial view of the Republic Day parade

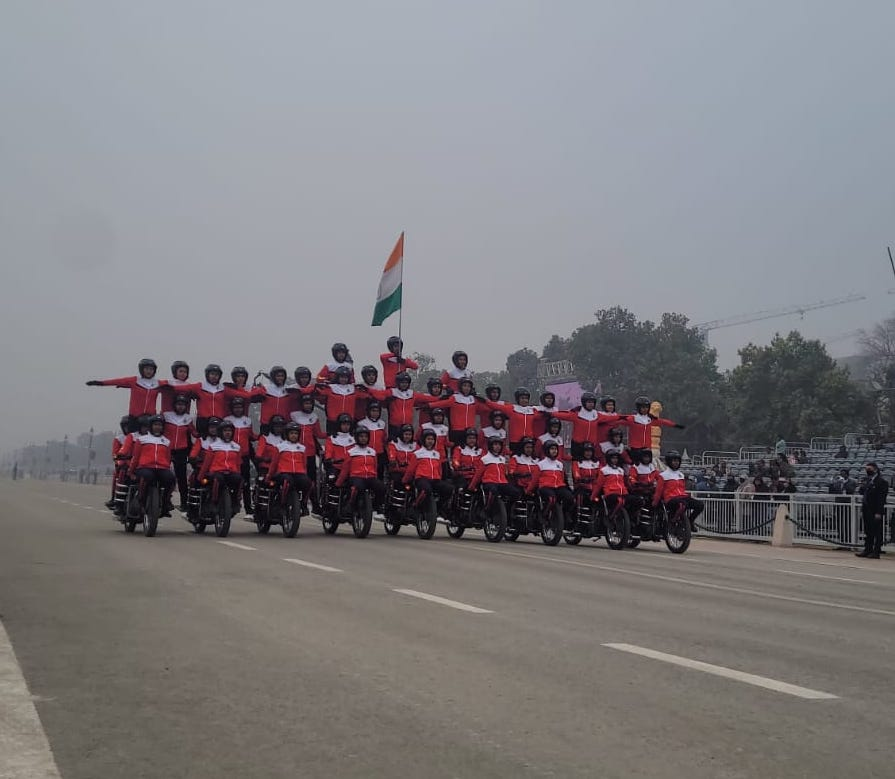
Republic Day Parade 2024

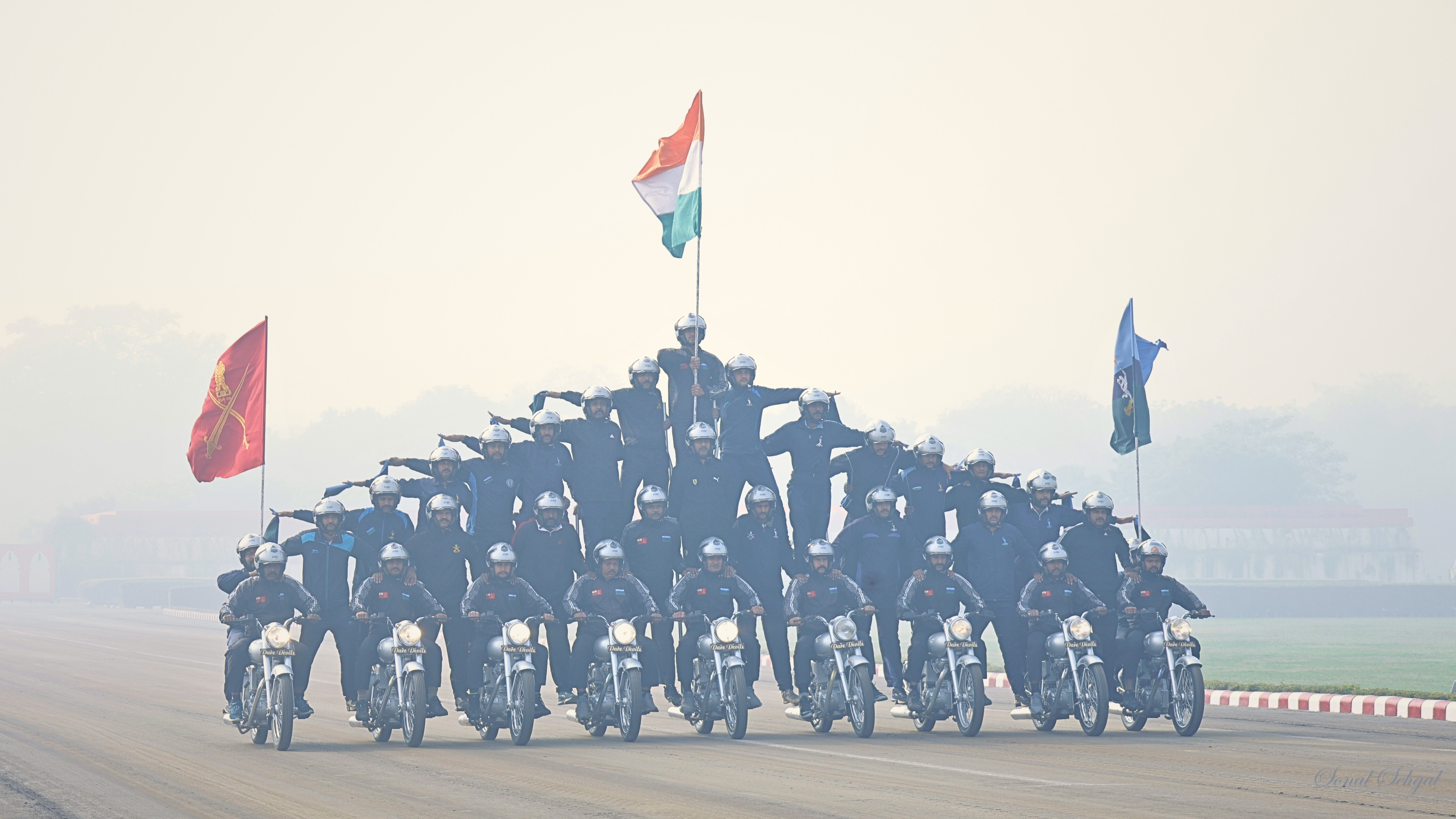
Republic Day Parade 2025

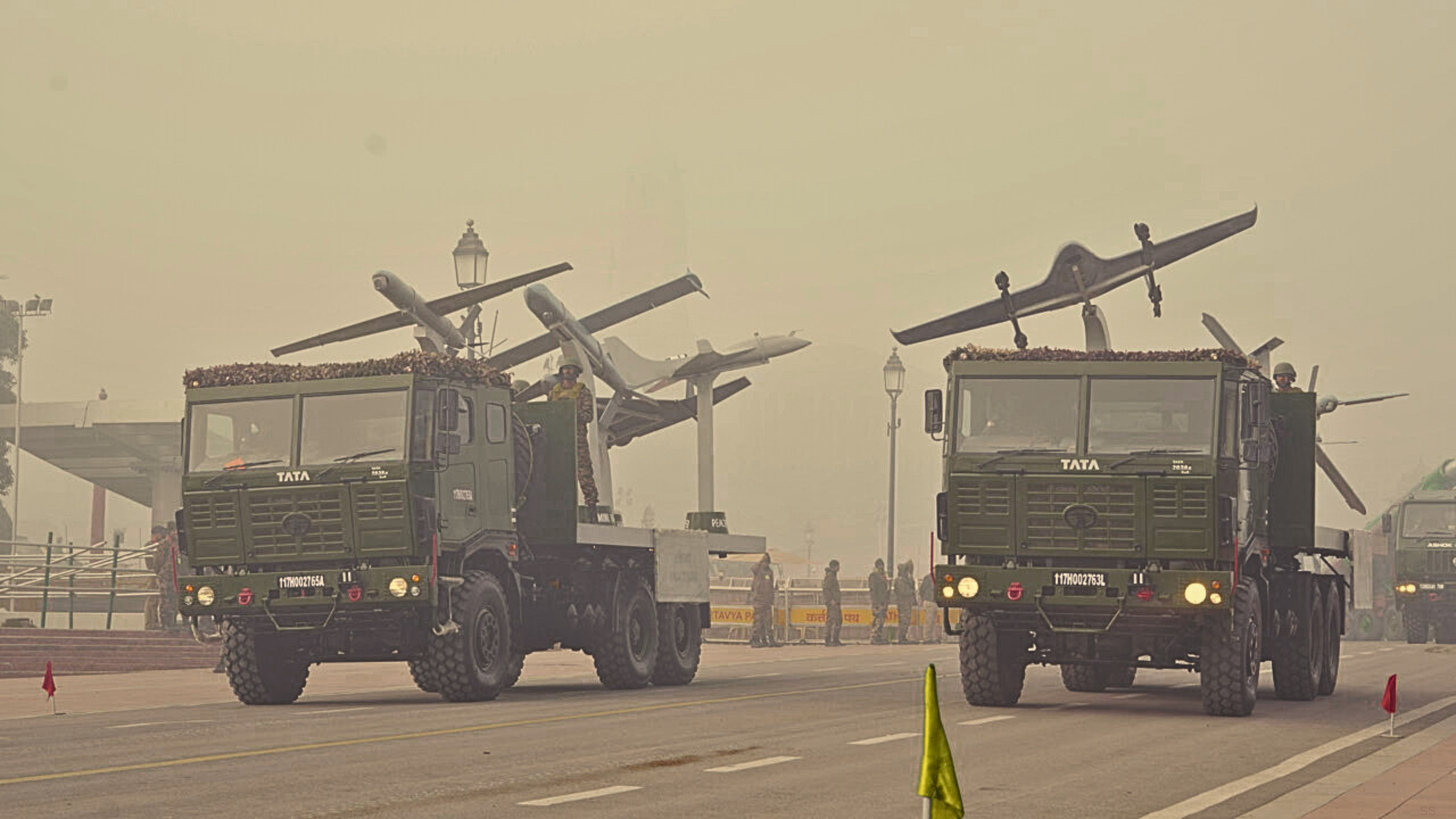
Kartavya Path, Republic Day parade 2026.

== See also ==
- History of India
- History of India (1947–present)
- Constitution Day (India)
