= Joint session of the Parliament of India =

Session to resolve legislative deadlock

The Parliament of India is bicameral; the concurrence of both houses is required to pass any bill. However, the framers of the Constitution of India anticipated situations of deadlock between the Rajya Sabha and the Lok Sabha. Therefore, the constitution provides for Joint sittings of both houses to break the deadlock.

The joint sitting of the Parliament is called by the President of India (Article 108) and is presided over by the Speaker of the Lok Sabha or, in their absence, by the Deputy Speaker of the Lok Sabha, or in their absence, the Deputy Chairman of the Rajya Sabha. The Chairperson of the Rajya Sabha, who is the Vice President of India, does not preside over the joint session. If any of the above officers are not present then any other member of the Parliament can preside by consensus of both houses.

At present, the Lok Sabha Chamber is used for holding joint sittings of both the houses of parliament, which is also used for addresses by the President in the commencement of first session after each general election.

== Constitutional provisions ==
As per Article 108 of the Constitution, a Joint session of Parliament can be summoned in the following situations.

If after a Bill has been passed by one House and submitted to the other House—

- (a) the Bill is rejected by the other House; or
- (b) the Houses have finally disagreed as to the amendments to be made in the Bill; or
- (c) more than six months elapse from the date of the reception of the Bill by the other House without the Bill being passed by it, the President may, unless the Bill has elapsed by reason of a dissolution of the House of the People, notify to the Houses by message if they are sitting or by public notification if they are not sitting, their intention to summon them to meet in a joint sitting for the purpose of deliberating and voting on the Bill.

However, in the calculating period of six months, those days are not considered when the house is prorogued or adjourned for more than four consecutive days.

If the above conditions are satisfied, the President of India may summon the joint sitting of both the houses of parliament.

== Exception to joint sittings ==
Two types of bills cannot be referred to a joint sitting

=== Money bills ===
Under the constitution, money bills require the approval of the Lok Sabha only. The Rajya Sabha can make recommendations to the Lok Sabha, which it is not required to accept. Even if the Rajya Sabha does not pass a money bill within 14 days, it is deemed to have been passed by both the Houses of Parliament after the expiry of the above period. Therefore, a requirement to summon a joint session can never arise in the case of a money bill.

=== Constitutional amendments ===
Article 368 of the constitution requires that the constitution can be amended by both houses of parliament by a two-thirds majority (special majority). In case of disagreement between both houses, the amendment automatically fails unless an agreement is reached before the Lok Sabha is dissolved.

== Bills referred to joint session ==
A Joint Sitting of Indian parliament has been called for only three bills:

1. Dowry Prohibition Bill, 1961
2. Banking Service Commission (Repeal) Bill, 1978
3. Prevention of Terrorism Bill, 2002
