= Constitutional autochthony =

Assertion of constitutional nationalism from an external power

In political science, constitutional autochthony is the process of asserting constitutional nationalism from an external legal or political power. The source of autochthony is the Greek word αὐτόχθων translated as springing from the land. It usually means the assertion of not just the concept of autonomy, but also the concept that the constitution derives from their own native traditions. The autochthony, or home grown nature of constitutions, give them authenticity and effectiveness. It was important in the making and revising of the constitutions of Bangladesh, India, Pakistan, Ghana, South Africa, Sierra Leone, Zambia and many other members of the British Commonwealth.

This proposition found doctrinal support in the influential theory propounded by the legal philosopher, Hans Kelsen, which had it that it was inconceivable for a legal system to split into two independent legal systems through a purely legal process. One of the implications of Kelsen’s theory was that the basic norm (German: Grundnorm) of the imperial predecessor’s Constitution would continue to be at the helm of the legal system of the newly liberated former colony despite the legal transfer of power, precisely because the transfer of power was recognised as 'legal' by the Constitution of the imperial predecessor.

== Ireland ==
A process of constitutional autochthony occurred in the Irish Free State between 1932 and 1937. The Fianna Fáil government elected in 1932 led by Éamon de Valera, who had opposed the Anglo-Irish Treaty in 1922 that had created the state, stripped the Irish Free State of many of the state symbols that it saw as being overtly reminiscent of British rule. Among the amendments made to the Constitution were the abolition of the Oath of Allegiance (by the Constitution (Removal of Oath) Act 1933), appeals to the United Kingdom's Judicial Committee of the Privy Council (by the Constitution (Amendment No. 22) Act 1933), and the office of the Governor-General (by the Constitution (Amendment No. 27) Act 1936). The abdication of Edward VIII in December 1936 was used to significantly redefine the royal connection.

In 1937, the Irish Government introduced a whole new constitution that replaced the 1922 Constitution, which as originally enacted had been agreed with the British Government following the 1921 Anglo-Irish Treaty. This changed the legal name of the country to Ireland (in English) and Éire (in Irish). It was possibly a break of legal continuity, since the new constitution was not enacted by Dáil Éireann but merely approved by it pending a plebiscite through statute, but was instead given legitimacy by the people of Ireland through a plebiscite.

The process de Valera engaged in from 1932 to 1937 has been described by Professor John M. Kelly and others as 'constitutional autochthony'.

== India ==
Independence was formally granted to India by the enactment of the Indian Independence Act 1947 though the executive decision to grant India independence was arrived at earlier in the Cabinet Mission Plan in 1946. It was under this Plan that the Constituent Assembly was envisaged and charged with the mandate of drafting the new Constitution for India. This was legally recognised in Section 8 of the Independence Act. The Cabinet Mission Plan had envisaged that the new Constitution would be put to the Crown-in-Parliament for approval.

The framers introduced two deliberate procedural errors in the enactment of the Constitution of India in violation of the Independence Act:

1. They did not put the Constitution to the approval of the either the British Parliament as envisaged by the Cabinet Mission Plan or the Governor-General as envisaged in the Indian Independence Act 1947;
2. Following the Irish precedent, Article 395 of the Constitution of India repealed the Indian Independence Act — something the Constituent Assembly did not have the authorisation to do.

In doing so, the framers not only repudiated the source which authorised them to enact the Constitution but it was also a denial, albeit symbolic, of Indian independence being a grant of the imperial Crown-in-Parliament.

== See also ==
- Dominion
- Patriation
- Statute of Westminster 1931
