= Upasarga =

Upasarga is a term used in Sanskrit grammar for a special class of twenty prepositional particles prefixed to verbs or to action nouns. In Vedic, these prepositions are separable from verbs; in classical Sanskrit the prefixing is obligatory.

The twenty prefixes (in Indic alphabetical order) are recognized in Pāṇini's Aṣṭādhyāyī at 1.4.58-59, and are enumerated in the gaṇapāṭha (#154):

1. ati- "beyond"
2. adhi- "over"
3. apa- "away"
4. api- "proximate"
5. abhi- "to, towards"
6. anu- "after"
7. ava- "off, down"
8. āṅ- "near"
9. ut-/ud- "up(wards)"
10. upa- "towards, near"
11. dus-/dur- "bad, difficult, hard"
12. ni- "down"
13. nis-/nir- "away"
14. parā- "away"
15. pari- "round, around"
16. pra- "forth"
17. prati- "against"
18. vi- "apart, asunder"
19. sam-/saṃ- "with"
20. su- "good, excellent"

By the usual rules of euphonic combination the two prepositions ending in visarga, niḥ and duḥ, have the alternative forms nis-/nir- and dus-/dur- respectively. The gaṇapāṭha listing has these variants, not the forms in pausa, and thus has twenty-two items in all.

A versified form of this list may be found in modern primers or textbooks:

praparāpasamanvavanirdurabhivyadhisūdatinipratiparyapayaḥ
upa āṅiti viṃśatireṣa sakhe upasargavidhiḥ kathitaḥ kavinā pra_parā_apa_sam_anu_ava_nir_dur_abhi_vi_adhi_su_ud_ati_ni_prati_pari_apayaḥ(api)
upaḥ āṅ iti viṃśatiḥ eṣa sakhe upasarga_vidhiḥ kathitaḥ kavinā
