= Constitution Day (India) =

Indian national holiday on 26 November

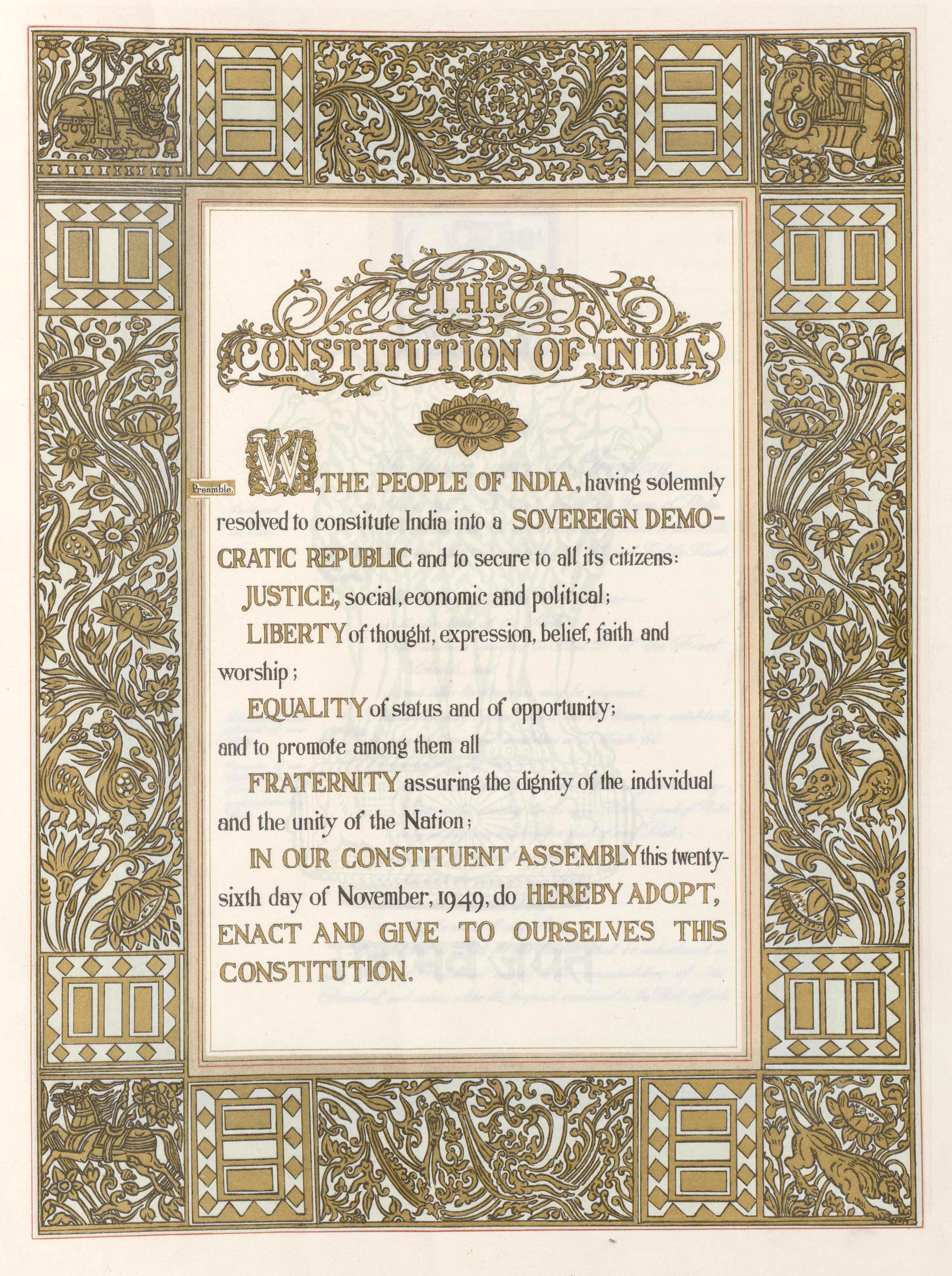
- Original text of the Preamble of the Indian constitution
- Official name: Samvidhan Divas
- Also called: National Law Day
- Observed by: India
- Significance: India adopted its constitution in November 1949
- Celebrations: Constitution-related activities in schools, colleges, Run for Equality, Special Parliamentary Session
- Date: 26 November
- Frequency: Annual
- First time: 2015
- Related to: Constitution of India, Republic Day (India)

The Constitution Day (IAST: Samvidhāna Divasa), also known as National Law Day, is celebrated in India on 26 November every year to commemorate the adoption of the Constitution of India. On 26 November 1949, the Constituent Assembly of India adopted the Constitution of India, and it came into effect on 26 January 1950 (Purna Swaraj first independence day on 30 January 1930 declared by Indian National Congress).

26 November was declared as Constitution Day by the Government of India on 19 November 2015 by a gazette notification. The Prime Minister of India Narendra Modi made the declaration on 11 October 2015 while laying the foundation stone of the B. R. Ambedkar's Statue of Equality memorial in Mumbai.

== Background ==
Since 2015 was the 125th birth anniversary year of B. R. Ambedkar (14 April 1891 – 6 December 1956), who is known as the father of the Indian constitution, the government decided in May 2015 to celebrate this year "in a big way". A special committee chaired by Prime Minister of India was announced for the year-long celebrations. Various ministries and departments will hold various programmes throughout the year to spread the thoughts and ideas of Ambedkar. As part of the celebrations, while laying the foundation stone for an Ambedkar memorial at the Indu Mills compounds in Mumbai in October 2015, the Prime Minister of India Narendra Modi announced that 26 November will be celebrated as "Constitution Day". In November 2015, the government officially announced the celebration of the day.

== Celebrations ==
Constitution Day is not just a public holiday. Various departments of the Government of India celebrated the first Constitution Day. As per the Department of Education and Literacy, the preamble of the Constitution was read in all schools by all students. In addition, there were quiz and essay competitions, both online and offline, on the subject of the constitution of India. There was a lecture on salient features of the Constitution in each school. The Department of Higher Education requested various universities to arrange mock parliamentary debates in colleges, and the University Grants Commission (UGC) arranged an all-India quiz competition at Ambedkar University, Lucknow, where quiz winners of all states participated.

The Ministry of External Affairs directed all overseas Indian schools to celebrate 26 November as Constitution Day and directed embassies to translate the constitution into the local language of that nation and distribute it to various academies, libraries and faculties of Indology. The work of translating the Indian constitution into Arabic has been completed. Department of Sport arranged symbolic run named "Run for Equality". There was also a special session of Indian parliament on 26 November 2015 to give tribute to the constitution and Ambedkar. The Parliament House complex was also illuminated on this occasion.

Students of Andhra University participated in the 'Run for Ambedkar' rally to mark the occasion of the 70th Constitution Day, on Beach Road in Visakhapatnam on 27 November 2019.

In 2023 celebration of the Constitution Day, the Government of Manipur under the leadership of Nongthombam Biren Singh, the then Chief Minister of Manipur, officially issued the bilingual edition of the Constitution of India, in the Meetei Mayek (Meitei for 'traditional Meitei writing system') in Meitei language (officially called Manipuri) and English, in the Cabinet Hall of the Chief Minister Secretariat in Imphal, having the contents up to the 105th Amendment of the Constitution, becoming the publication of the first time of its kind in its history. It was made to be accessible to everyone in all the educational institutions, government offices, and public libraries across the state of Manipur.

== See also ==
- Republic Day (India)
- Samvidhaan Hatya Diwas
- Constitution Day – other countries' celebrations
