= Recognition of same-sex unions in Uttarakhand =

Uttarakhand does not recognise same-sex marriages or civil unions. However, live-in relationships are not unlawful in Uttarakhand. The Indian Supreme Court has held that adults have a constitutional right to live together without being married, and that police cannot interfere with consenting adults living together. The Uttarakhand High Court upheld this constitutional right in Madhu Bala v. State of Uttarakhand in 2020 and in Rohit Sagar v. State of Uttarakhand in 2021, and further ruled that if a couple faces threats from family or the community they may request police protection.

In 2024, the Uttarakhand Legislative Assembly passed a uniform civil code establishing a unified set of personal laws governing matters such as marriage, live-in relationships, divorce, adoption and inheritance, irrespective of religion, caste or creed. Despite media outlets reporting that the government was considering including same-sex unions in some form in the draft code, the final civil code excludes same-sex couples from its marriage and live-in relationship provisions.

== Legal history ==
=== Background ===
Marriage in India is governed under several federal laws. These laws allow for the solemnisation of marriages according to different religions, notably Hinduism, Jainism, Buddhism, Christianity, Islam, Sikhism and Zoroastrianism. Every citizen has the right to choose which law will apply to them based on their community or religion. These laws are the Hindu Marriage Act, 1955, the Indian Christian Marriage Act, 1872, the Muslim Personal Law (Shariat) Application Act, 1937, the Anand Marriage Act, 1909 and the Parsi Marriage and Divorce Act, 1936. The Special Marriage Act, 1954 (SMA; Hindi: विशेष विवाह अधिनियम, १९५४, Viśeṣ Vivāh Adhiniyam; Sanskrit: विशेष विवाह नियम, १९५४, Viśeṣa Vivāhá Niyamá) allows civil marriage officers to solemnize and register marriages for all Indian citizens regardless of the religion of either party. Although the vast majority of marriages in India continue to be solemnized and registered under the traditional religious personal laws, the SMA has become popular among interfaith couples, inter-caste couples, and spouses with no religious beliefs. None of these acts explicitly bans same-sex marriage.

On 14 February 2006, the Supreme Court of India ruled in Smt. Seema v. Ashwani Kumar that the states and union territories are obliged to register all marriages performed under the federal laws. The court's ruling was expected to reduce instances of child marriages, bigamy, domestic violence and unlawful abandonment. In 2010, the state government published the Uttarakhand Compulsory Registration of Marriage Rules, 2010, providing for the registration of all marriages performed in Uttarakhand. The measure created local registrars that issued marriage licenses to prospective spouses, though registrars could refuse to issue licenses if the parties failed to meet the requirements to marry under the federal marriage laws. It did not explicitly prohibit same-sex marriages, and defined marriage as "all the marriages contracted by person belonging to any caste, tribe or religion, and the marriages contracted as per any custom, practices or traditions, and also includes re-marriages". However, the marriage license form required the names of the "bride" and the "bridegroom". The 2010 rules were superseded in January 2025 when a new uniform civil code (समान नागरिक संहिता, samān nāgrik sãhitā) came into force. On 7 February 2024, the Uttarakhand Legislative Assembly passed the Uniform Civil Code of Uttarakhand Act, 2024, which is applicable to all residents of the state irrespective of religion, caste or creed, with the exception of those belonging to Scheduled Tribes. Chief Minister Pushkar Singh Dhami described it as a "historic moment". During legislative deliberations in June 2023, media outlets reported that a government committee was considering the introduction of a uniform civil code including provisions on same-sex live-in relationships and "the rights of the LGBTQ community". However, a member of the committee was later quoted as saying that legal rights for same-sex couples would be "unlikely". The final code, which took effect on 27 January 2025, does not address same-sex unions. It requires the registration of all marriages and live-in relationships, but uses heteronormative terms with regard to spouses and excludes same-sex couples from its marriage and live-in relationship provisions.

Traditional Indian marriages (विवाह, vivāh) are deeply rooted in custom and hold significant cultural importance. They involve elaborate pre-wedding preparations and culminate in key rituals, including the tying of the mangala sutra and the saptapadi. Arranged marriage remains the prevailing norm across India, accounting for the vast majority of unions, and often placing pressure on LGBT individuals to marry partners of the opposite sex. Nevertheless, some same-sex couples have participated in traditional marriage ceremonies, although these unions lack legal recognition in Uttarakhand. The first recorded same-sex marriage occurred in May 2015 at the Naina Devi Temple in Nainital between Parisha and Debi Chatterji. They said, "We have the right to live it by our own choices. Everybody should do that. And having said that, we don't mean everyone should follow our footsteps. They should follow their heart and passion." Another couple, Lalit Kumar, 31, and Amit Kumar, 26, were married in the village of Sarso in the Almora district in July 2017. They married in a Hindu temple despite the objection of their families.

=== Live-in relationships ===
Recognition of same-sex unions in India

Live-in relationships (Hindi: सहवास संबंध, sahvās sambandh, pronounced [ˈsəɦʋaːs ˈsəmbə̃ndʱ], or लिव-इन रिलेशनशिप, liv-in rileśanśip; Sanskrit: सहवास सम्बन्ध, sahávāsa saṁbandhá) are not illegal in Uttarakhand. The Indian Supreme Court has held that adults have a constitutional right to live together without being married, that police cannot interfere with consenting adults living together, and that live-in relationships are not unlawful. State courts have upheld this constitutional right, and further ruled that if a couple faces threats from family or the community they may request police protection. However, live-in relationships do not confer all the legal rights and benefits of marriage.

The Uttarakhand High Court has issued two judgments regarding same-sex live-in relationships. In June 2020, the High Court ruled in Madhu Bala v. State of Uttarakhand that live-in relationships between same-sex couples are not unlawful; "It is a fundamental right which is guaranteed to a person under Article 21 of the Constitution of India, which is wide enough to protect an inherent right of self determination with regards to one's identity and freedom of choice with regards to the sexual orientation of choice of the partner". The court pointed out that the liberty of an adult person cannot be curtailed so long as they are capable to making a choice for themselves, and that they are entitled to enjoy the freedoms permitted by law. In this case, the petitioner, Madhu Bala, filed the habeas corpus writ petition accusing family members of wrongfully detaining her partner. In oral arguments on 27 May 2020, the partner told the court that she wished to live with Bala. However, that statement was made in the absence of her family members. The court noted that the case could not be decided in their absence since the allegation of wrongful confinement had been made against them. In a second hearing in front of the court on 8 June 2020, with family members in attendance, the partner retracted her previous statement and said she would like to reside in her parents' home. Although the court affirmed the legal principle that live-in relationships are not unlawful, the court subsequently dismissed the writ petition because the partner said she wished to live with her parents. Surabhi Shukla, a law professor at the University of Sheffield, said in a statement, "The court severely waters down this right [live-in relationships] in application in this case. They do not implement the declaration made by one of the women in the relationship that she wants to continue to live with her partner because she makes this statement in the absence of her family. This raises the question: is this because of the deep-seated paternalism and homophobia of the legal system, or is it because the legal procedure requires the presence of her family members in this case." In December 2021, the High Court issued a decision in Rohit Sagar v. State of Uttarakhand, upholding the rights of adults to choose their life partners, even when confronted with objections from their families. The court instructed police in the Udham Singh Nagar district to protect both petitioners.

=== Transgender and intersex issues ===
Like most of South Asia, Uttarakhand recognizes a traditional third gender community known as hijra (हिजड़ा, hijṛā), historically holding respected community roles, and known for their distinct culture, communities led by gurus, and traditional roles as performers. The Supreme Court's 2023 ruling in Supriyo v. Union of India held that the Indian Constitution does not require the legalisation of same-sex marriages but affirmed that transgender people may marry opposite-sex partners. The Uniform Civil Code does not address the marriages of transgender individuals.

== Public opinion ==
According to a 2019 report titled "Politics and Society Between Elections 2019", published by the Azim Premji Foundation and the Centre for the Study of Developing Societies, Uttarakhand ranked among the most supportive states and union territories in the nation regarding same-sex unions, after Uttar Pradesh, Delhi and Tamil Nadu.

== See also ==
- LGBT rights in India
- Recognition of same-sex unions in India
- Supriyo v. Union of India
