= Secularism in India =

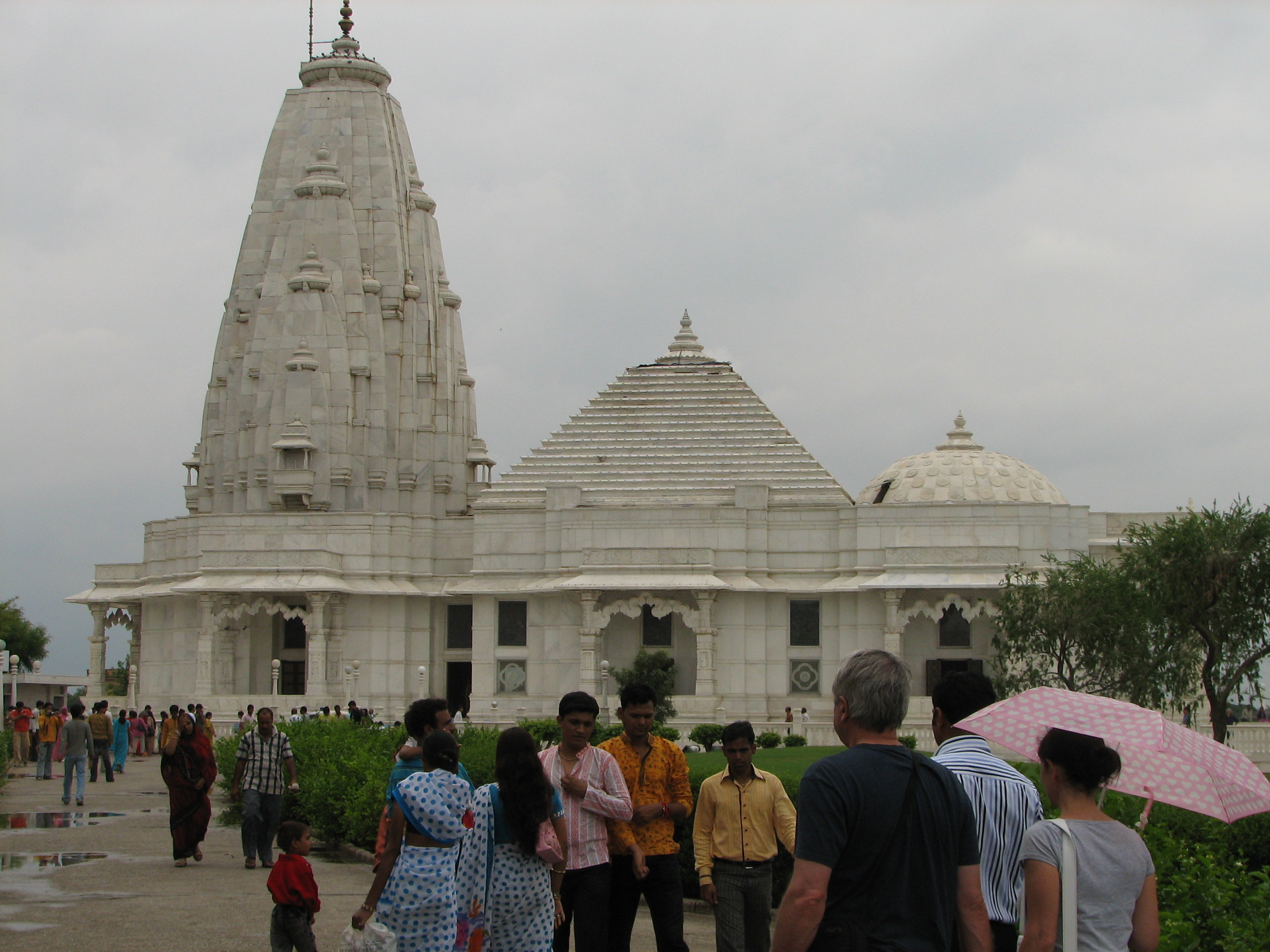
A Hindu temple in Jaipur, Rajasthan, India, merging the traditional tiered tower of Hinduism, the pyramid stupa of Buddhism and the dome of Islam. The marble sides are carved with figures of Hindu deities, as well as Christian saints and Jesus Christ.

The secular values were enshrined in the constitution of India. India's first prime minister Jawaharlal Nehru is credited with the formation of the secular republic in the modern history of the country. With the Forty-second Amendment of the Constitution of India enacted in 1976, the Preamble to the Constitution asserted that India is a secular nation. However, the Supreme Court of India in the 1994 case S. R. Bommai v. Union of India established the fact that India was secular since the formation of the republic. The judgement established that there is separation of state and religion. It stated "In matters of State, religion has no place. [...] Any State Government which pursues unsecular policies or unsecular course of action acts contrary to the constitutional mandate and renders itself amenable to action under Article 356". Furthermore, constitutionally, state-owned educational institutions are prohibited from imparting religious instructions, and Article 27 of the constitution prohibits using tax-payers money for the promotion of any religion.

Officially, secularism has always inspired modern India. However, India's secularism does not completely separate religion and state. The Indian Constitution has allowed extensive interference of the state in religious affair. The degree of separation between the state and religion has varied with several court and executive orders in place since the establishment of the Republic. In matters of law in modern India, personal laws – on matters such as marriage, divorce, inheritance, alimony – varies if one is a Muslim or not (Muslims have an option to marry under secular law if they wish). The Indian Constitution permits partial financial support for religious schools as well as the financing of religious buildings and infrastructure by the state. The Islamic Central Waqf Council and many Hindu temples of great religious significance are administered and managed (through funding) by the federal and the state governments in accordance with the Places of Worship (Special Provisions) Act, 1991, and the Ancient Monuments and Archaeological Sites and Remains Act, 1958, which mandates state maintenance of religious buildings that were created before August 15, 1947 (the date of Indian independence), while also retaining their religious character. The attempt to respect religious law has created a number of issues in India, such as acceptability of polygamy, unequal inheritance rights, extrajudicial unilateral divorce rights favorable to some males, and conflicting interpretations of religious books.

== History ==
Ashoka about 2200 years ago, Harsha about 1400 years ago accepted and patronised different religions. The people in ancient India had freedom of religion, and the state granted citizenship to each individual regardless of whether someone's religion was Hinduism, Buddhism, Jainism or any other. Ellora cave temples built next to each other between 5th and 10th centuries, for example, shows a coexistence of religions and a spirit of acceptance of different faiths.

There should not be honour of one's own (religious) sect and condemnation of others without any grounds.

— Ashoka, Rock Edicts XII, about 250 BC,

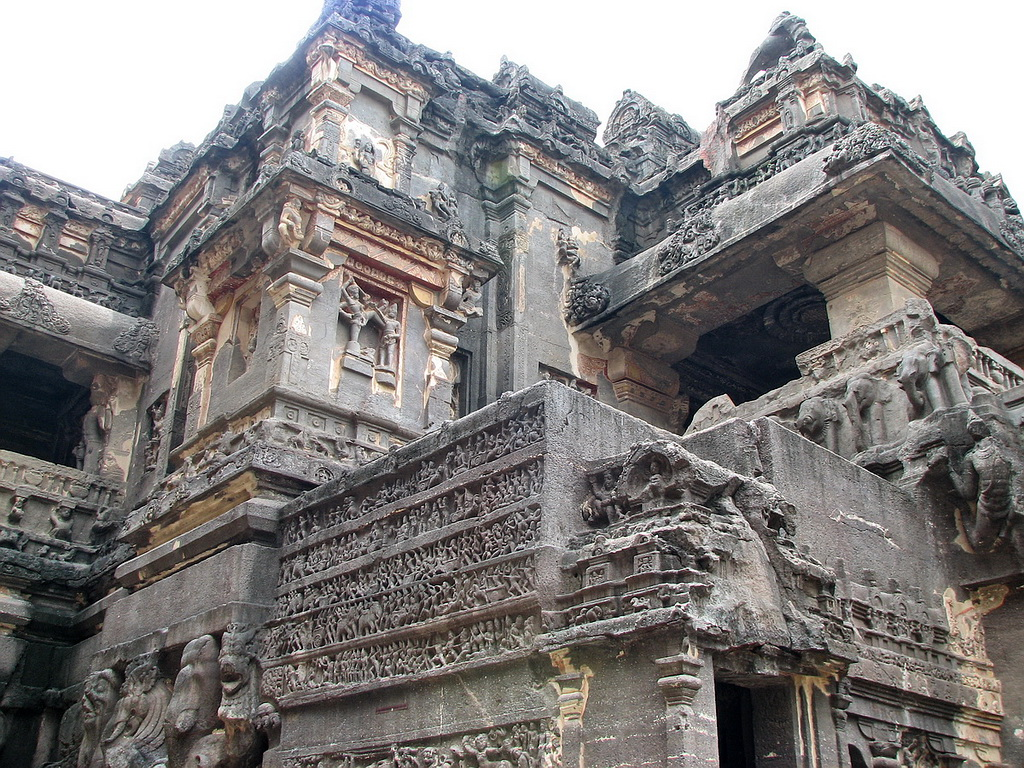
Ellora Caves, a World Heritage Site, are in the Indian state of Maharashtra. The 35 caves were carved into the vertical face of the Charanandri hills between the 5th and 10th centuries. The 12 Buddhist caves, 17 Hindu caves and 5 Jain caves, built in proximity, suggest religious co-existence and secular sentiments for diversity prevalent during the pre-Islamic period of Indian history.

This approach to interfaith relations changed with the arrival of Islam and establishment of Delhi Sultanate in North India by the 12th century, but it was not the only cause the enmity in minds of Hindu lower caste had risen to the top because of the discrimination by Brahmins followed by the Deccan sultanates in Central India. The political doctrines of Islam, as well as its religious views were at odds with doctrines of Hinduism, Sikhism, Christianity and other Indian religions. New temples and monasteries were not allowed. As with Levant, Southeastern Europe and Spain, Islamic rulers in India treated Hindus, Buddhists, Jains and Sikhs as dhimmis in exchange of annual payment of jizya taxes, in a sharia-based state jurisprudence. With the arrival of Mughal era, Sharia was imposed with continued zeal, with Akbar – the Mughal Emperor – as the first significant exception. Akbar sought to fuse ideas, professed equality between Islam and other religions of India, forbade forced conversions to Islam, abolished religion-based discriminatory jizya taxes, and welcomed building of Hindu temples.

After Aurangzeb, India came into control of East India Company and the British Raj. The colonial administrators did not separate religion from state, but marked the end of equal hierarchy between Islam and Hinduism, and reintroduced the notion of equality before the law for Hindus, Christians and Muslims. The British Empire sought commerce and trade, with a policy of neutrality to all of India's diverse religions. Before 1858, the Britishers followed the policy of patronizing and supporting the native religions as the earlier rulers had done. By the mid-19th century, the British Raj administered India, in matters related to marriage, inheritance of property and divorces, according to personal laws based on each Indian subject's religion, according to interpretations of respective religious documents by Islamic jurists, Hindu pandits and other religious scholars. In 1864, the Raj eliminated all religious jurists, pandits and scholars because the interpretations of the same verse or religious document varied, the scholars and jurists disagreed with each other, and the process of justice had become inconsistent and suspiciously corrupt. The late 19th century marked the arrival of Anglo-Hindu and Anglo-Muslim personal laws to divide adjacent communities by British, where the governance did not separate the state and religion, but continued to differentiate and administer people based on their personal religion. The British Raj provided the Indian Christians, Indian Zoroastrians, Indian Jews and others with their own personal laws, such as the Indian Succession Act of 1850, Special Marriage Act of 1872 and other laws that were similar to Common Laws in Europe.

Although the British administration provided India with a common law, its divide and rule policy contributed to promoting discord between communities. The Morley-Minto reforms provided separate electorate to Muslims, justifying the demands of the All-India Muslim League, eventually paving the way for the creation of Pakistan.

In the first half of 20th century, the British Raj faced increasing amounts of social activism for self-rule by a disparate groups such as those led by Hindu Gandhi and Muslim Jinnah; the colonial administration, under pressure, enacted a number of laws before India's independence in 1947, that continue to be the laws of India in 2013. One such law enacted during the colonial era was the 1937 Indian Muslim Personal Law (Shariat) Application Act, which instead of separating state and religion for Western secularism, did the reverse.

It, along with additional laws such as Dissolution of Muslim Marriages Act of 1939 that followed, established the principle that religious laws of Indian Muslims can be their personal laws. It also set the precedent that religious law, such as sharia, can overlap and supersede common and civil laws, that elected legislators may not revise or enact laws that supersede religious laws, that people of one nation need not live under the same laws, and that law enforcement process for different individuals shall depend on their religion. The Indian Muslim Personal Law (Shariat) Application Act of 1937 continues to be the law of land of modern India for Indian Muslims, while parliament-based, non-religious uniform civil code passed in mid-1950s applies to Indians who are Hindus (which includes Buddhists, Jains, Sikhs, Zoroastrians), as well as to Indian Christians and Jews.

== Current status ==
The 7th schedule of Indian constitution places religious institutions, charities and trusts into so-called Concurrent List, which means that both the central government of India, and various state governments in India can make their own laws about religious institutions, charities and trusts. If there is a conflict between central government enacted law and state government law, then the central government law prevails. This principle of overlap, rather than separation of religion and state in India was further recognised in a series of constitutional amendments starting with Article 290 in 1956, to the addition of word 'secular' to the Preamble of Indian Constitution in 1975.

The overlap of religion and state, through Concurrent List structure, has given various religions in India, state support to religious schools and personal laws. This state intervention while resonant with the dictates of each religion, are unequal and conflicting. For example, a 1951 Religious and Charitable Endowment Indian law allows state governments to forcibly take over, own and operate Hindu temples, and collect revenue from offerings and redistribute that revenue to any non-temple purposes including maintenance of religious institutions opposed to the temple; Indian law also allows Islamic and other minority religious schools to receive partial financial support from state and central government of India, to offer religious indoctrination, if the school agrees that the student has an option to opt out from religious indoctrination if he or she so asks, and that the school will not discriminate any student based on religion, race or any other grounds. Educational institutions wholly owned and operated by government are prohibited from imparting religious indoctrination, but religious sects and endowments may open their own school, impart religious indoctrination and have a right to partial state financial assistance.

Scholars have identified the judiciary as a central agent in shaping Indian secularism. In his study of the Supreme Court and secularism, Ronojoy Sen argued that through the essential practices doctrine the Court made itself not only the gatekeeper of what qualified as religion but also the arbiter separating superstition from religion, taking up an overt role in rationalizing religion and marginalizing practices that did not meet its test — a role articulated most clearly in the landmark judgments delivered by Justice P. B. Gajendragadkar in the early 1960s.

== Secularism and Hindu nationalism ==
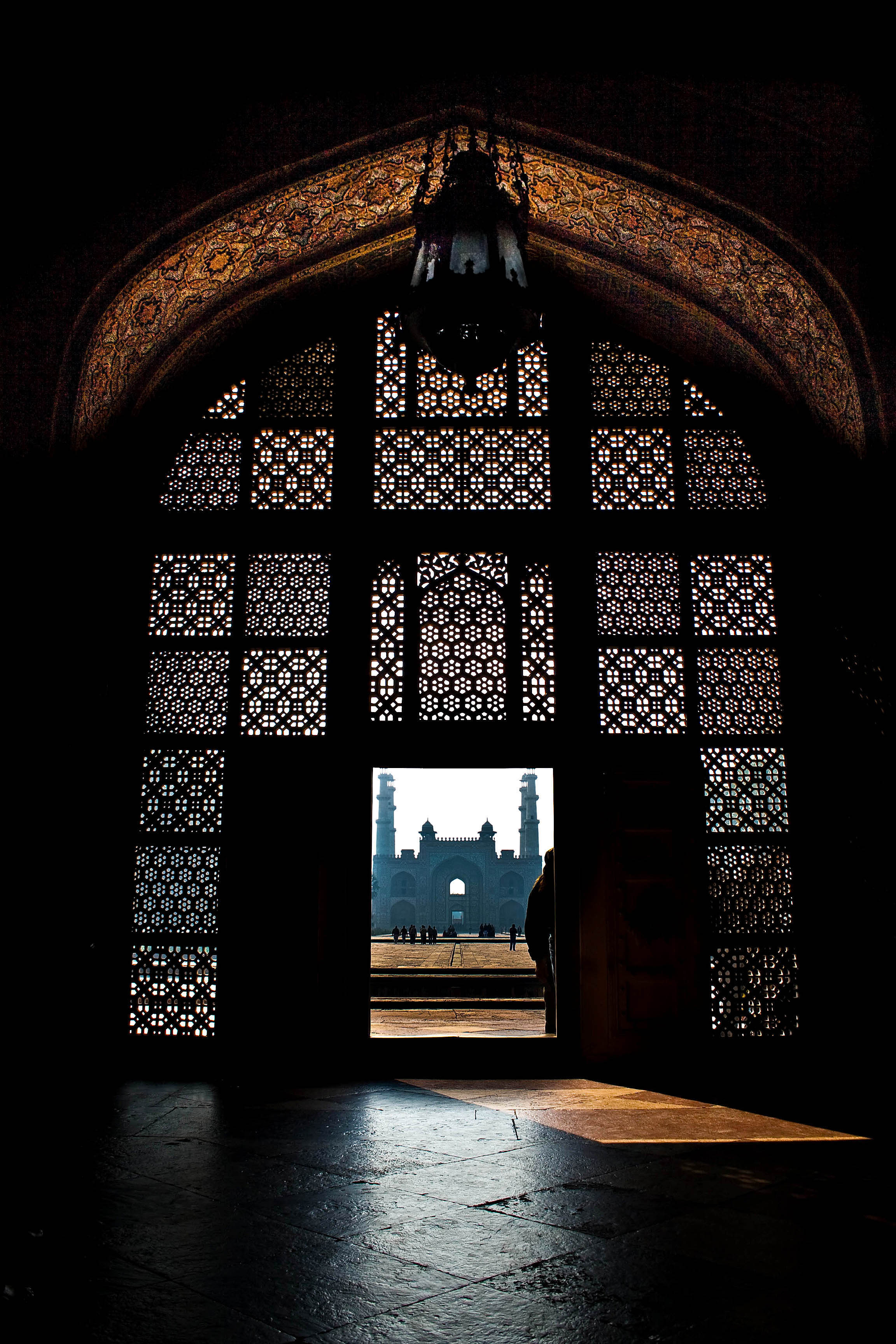
Akbar's tomb at Sikandrabad, near Agra, Uttar Pradesh, India. Akbar's instructions for his mausoleum were that it incorporate elements from different religions, including Islam and Hinduism.

According to a Pew Research report from 2021, nearly two-thirds of Indian Hindus (64%) say that it is very important to be Hindu to be "truly Indian". However, only 7 out of 20 Hindus are in favour of turning India into a Hindu Rashtra. The overlap between religion and state has created tension between supporters of an Indian form of secularism and the supporters of Hindu nationalism. Hindu nationalists characterize secularism as practiced in India as pseudo-secularism, for the "political appeasement of minorities". As of 28 July 2020, there were appeals to the Supreme court of India to remove the words secular and socialist from the Preamble to the Constitution of India., former Rajya Sabha Member of Parliament Subramanian Swamy having submitted one such appeal.

Right-wing organizations like the Rashtriya Swayamsevak Sangh, the Bajrang Dal, and the Vishwa Hindu Parishad have demanded that India should be declared a "Hindu nation" by constitution to safeguard the rights and life of Hindus in India.

== Comparison with Western secularism ==
In the West, the word secular implies three things: freedom of religion, equal citizenship to each citizen regardless of their religion, and the separation of religion and state (polity). One of the core principles in the constitution of Western democracies has been this separation, with the state asserting its political authority in matters of law, while accepting every individual's right to pursue their own religion and the right of religion to shape its own concepts of spirituality. Everyone is equal under law, and subject to the same laws irrespective of their religion, in the West.

In contrast, in India, the word secular does not imply thorough-going separation of religion and state. According to the Constitution of India, states Smith, there is no official state religion in India, schools that are wholly owned by the state can not mandate religious instruction (Article 28), and tax-payers money cannot be used to support any religion (Article 27). Overlap is permitted, whereby institutions that are not entirely financed by the state can mandate religious instruction, and state can provide financial aid to maintain religious buildings or infrastructure in accordance with law. Furthermore, India's constitutional framework allows "extensive state interference in religious affairs".

According to R.A. Jahagirdar, in the Indian context, secularism has been interpreted as the equality before law, including of all religions, while the state is neutral. Article 44 of the Directive Principles of State Policy adds, "the state shall endeavor to secure for the citizens a uniform civil code throughout the territory of India." This intent for secular personal laws has been unsettling especially to Indian Muslims, states Smith, in part because they view the alteration of Muslim personal law to be a "grave violation of their freedom of religion".

The term secularism in India also differs from the French concept for secularity, namely laïcité. While the French concept demands absence of governmental institutions in religion, as well as absence of religion in governmental institutions and schools; the Indian concept, in contrast, provides financial support to religious schools. The Indian structure has created incentives for various religious denominations to start and maintain schools, impart religious education (optionally), and receive partial but significant financial support from the Indian government. Similarly, the Indian government has established statutory institutions to regulate and financially administer the historic Islamic Central Waqf Council, historic Hindu temples, Buddhist monasteries, and certain Christian religious institutions.

Against both the French and American models of exclusionary separation of church and state, the political theorist Rajeev Bhargava has advanced the conception he calls "principled distance", under which the state, having separated itself from religion, may support some religious practices and inhibit others, intervening or abstaining on the basis of values such as the reduction of inter-religious and intra-religious domination rather than under a rule of strict neutrality or equidistance.

== Law ==
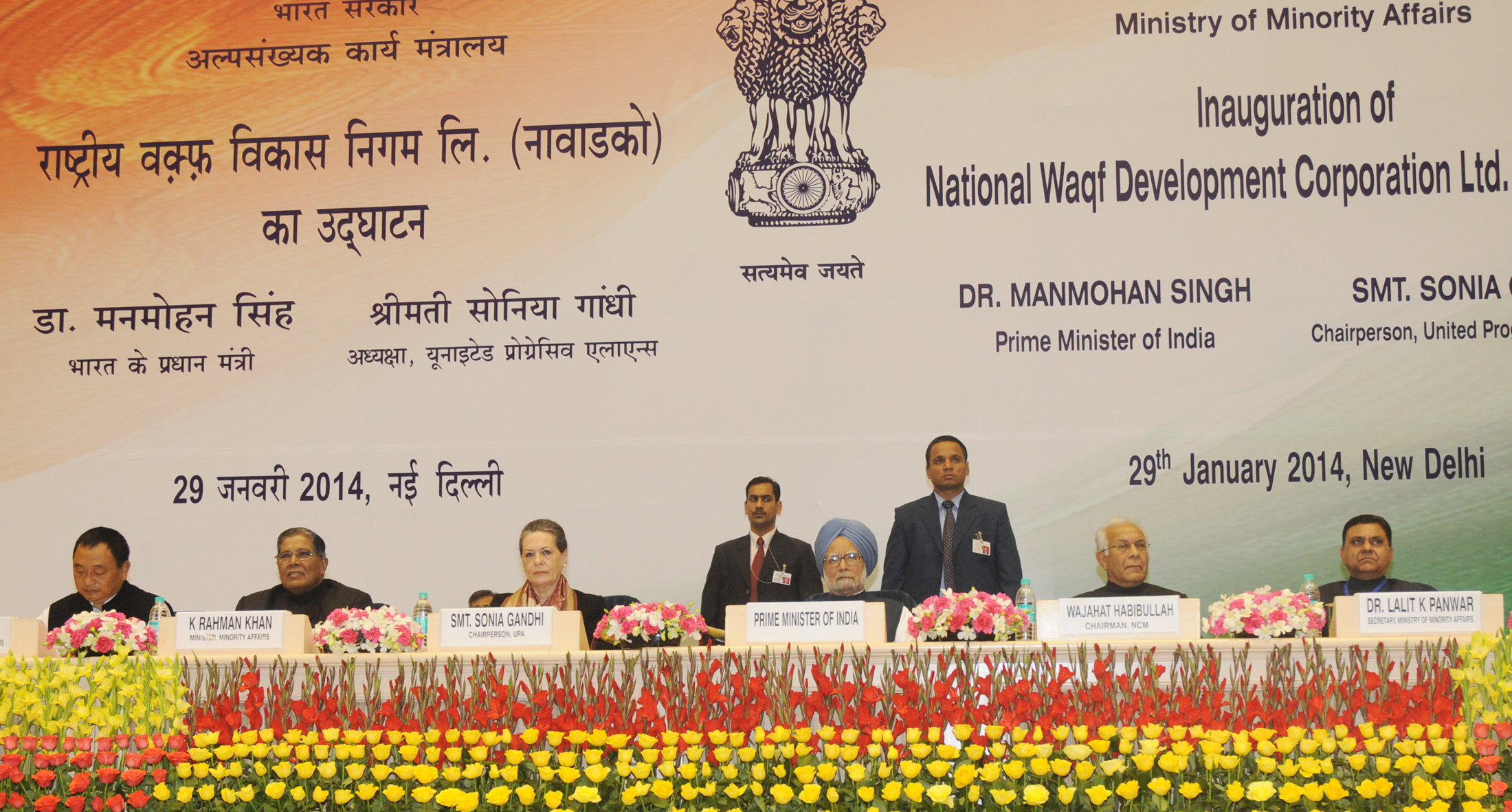
The central and state governments of India finance and manage religious buildings and infrastructure. Above: the inauguration of the onal Waqf Development Corporation Limited in 2014 for Waqf properties.

In terms of religions of India with significant populations, only Islam has religious laws in form of Sharia which India allows as Muslim Personal Law. These differences have led a number of scholars to declare that India is not a secular state, as the word secularism is widely understood in the West and elsewhere. The attempt to have a Uniform Civil Code has long been discussed as a means to realize a secular Indian state.

Indian concept of secularism, where religious laws are applicable to certain minorities and the state is expected to even-handedly involve itself in religion, is a controversial subject. According to a Pew Research report in 2021, three-quarters of Muslims (74%) support having access to the existing system of Islamic courts, but followers of other religions are far less likely to support Muslim access to this separate court system.

=== Shah Bano case ===
For several years past it has been the cherished desire of the Muslims of British India that Customary Law should in no case take the place of Muslim Personal Law. The matter has been repeatedly agitated in the press as well as on the platform. The Jamiat-ul-Ulema-i-Hind, the greatest Moslem religious body has supported the demand and invited the attention of all concerned to the urgent necessity of introducing a measure to this effect.

— Preamble to Muslim Personal Law (Shariat) Application Act, 1937,

In 1978, the Shah Bano case brought the secularism debate along with a demand for uniform civil code in India to the forefront.

Shah Bano was a 62-year-old Muslim Indian who was divorced from her husband of 44 years in 1978. Indian Muslim Personal Law required her husband to pay no alimony. Shah Bano sued for regular maintenance payments under Section 125 of the Criminal Procedure Code, 1978. Shah Bano won her case, as well as appeals to the highest court. Along with alimony, the Chief Justice of the Supreme Court of India wrote in his opinion just how unfairly Islamic personal laws treated women and thus how necessary it was for the nation to adopt a Uniform Civil Code. The Chief Justice further ruled that no authoritative text of Islam forbade the payment of regular maintenance to ex-wives.

The Shah Bano ruling immediately triggered controversy and mass demonstrations by Muslim men. The Islamic Clergy and the Muslim Personal Law Board of India argued against the ruling. Shortly after the Supreme Court's ruling, the Indian government with Rajiv Gandhi as Prime Minister, enacted a new law which deprived all Muslim women, and only Muslim women, of the right of maintenance guaranteed to women of Hindu, Christian, Parsees, Jews and other religions. Indian Muslims consider the new 1986 law, which selectively exempts them from maintenance payment to ex-wife because of their religion, as secular because it respects Muslim men's religious rights and recognises that they are culturally different from Indian men and women of other religions. Muslim opponents argue that any attempt to introduce Uniform Civil Code, that is equal laws for every human being independent of their religion, would reflect majoritarian Hindu sensibilities and ideals.

=== Islamic feminists ===
The controversy is not limited to Hindu versus Muslim populations in India. The Islamic feminists movement in India, for example, claim that the issue with Muslim Personal Law in India is a historic and ongoing misinterpretation of the Quran. The feminists claim that the Quran grants Muslim women rights that in practice are routinely denied to them by male Muslim ulema in India. They claim that the 'patriarchal' interpretations of the Quran on the illiterate Muslim Indian masses is abusive, and they demand that they have a right to read the Quran for themselves and interpret it in a woman-friendly way. India has no legal mechanism to accept or enforce the demands of these Islamic feminists over religious law.

=== Women's rights in India ===
Some religious rights granted by Indian concept of secularism, which are claimed as abusive against Indian women, include child marriage, polygamy, unequal inheritance rights of women and men, extrajudicial unilateral divorce rights of Muslim man that are not allowed to a Muslim woman, and subjective nature of shariat courts, jamaats, dar-ul quzat and religious qazis who preside over Islamic family law matters. Triple Talaq was banned in India, following a historic bill being passed on 30 July 2019.

=== State subsidy for religious pilgrimage ===
India continued offering liberal subsidies for religious pilgrimage after 1950, under its polymorphous interpretation of secularism. The largest and most controversial has been the Haj subsidy program for the Islamic pilgrimage to Mecca, which was criticized as benefitting affluent Muslims and discriminatory against Hindus and Christians who did not get similar subsidy for trips to their own holy places. The central government spent about $120 million in Haj subsidies in 2011. In 2012, the Supreme Court of India ordered an end to the religious subsidies program within 10 years. According to a Wall Street Journal article, Indian Muslim leaders supported an end to the Hajj subsidies, because "hajj must be performed with money righteously earned by a Muslim, and not on money from charity or borrowings. ."

=== Goa ===
Goa is the only state in India which has Uniform Civil Code. This system is derived from Portuguese colonization and is maintained until today. The Goa Civil Code, also called the Goa Family Law, is the set of civil laws that governs the residents of the Indian state of Goa. In India, as a whole, there are religion-specific civil codes that separately govern adherents of different religions. Goa is an exception to that rule, in that a single secular code/law governs all Goans, irrespective of religion, ethnicity or linguistic affiliation. It suggests the possibility to establish uniform civil code within a country having rich religious diversity like India. There are still problems in terms of actual implementation in everyday life.

== Academic debates ==
=== The Smith-Galanter Exchange ===
The foundational academic study of the subject, Donald E. Smith's India as a Secular State (1963), defined the secular state through freedom of religion, citizenship unrelated to religion, and the separation of state and religion, and applied those principles to India and answered with a qualified yes. Smith argued that India was secular in the same sense in which it could be called a democracy, the ideal being embodied in the Constitution and implemented in substantial measure. Marc Galanter objected that Smith's concept was "a projection from the American pattern with an extra dose of separation", resting on the Western Christian assumption that the core of religion is private faith and worship, and argued that secularism needed to be reformulated from a Western into a universal ideal. Smith replied that the disagreement lay not with his concept of secularism but with history: the expansion of state jurisdiction at the expense of traditional religion had begun under British rule, and post-independence legislation merely continued that process.

=== The Madan-Nandy Critique ===
In an influential 1987 lecture, the sociologist T. N. Madan argued that secularism in South Asia was "impossible" as a generally shared credo of life, "impracticable" as a basis for state action, and "impotent" as a blueprint for the future, because the great majority of South Asians were active adherents of religious faiths and the ideology was by its nature incapable of countering religious fundamentalism. Tracing the ideology of secularism to the dialectic of modern science and Protestantism, Madan described secularization as a "gift of Christianity" whose transfer to societies with different religious traditions could not be taken for granted, and concluded that secularism had to be put in its place: not rejected, but given a culturally meaningful form of expression compatible with religious faith. Ashis Nandy's "An Anti-Secularist Manifesto" distinguished two meanings of secularism in Indian public life: the modern Western sense, in which tolerance is sought through the devaluation of religion in public and the separation of politics from religion, and an Indian usage in which the secular is opposed not to the sacred but to ethnocentrism, xenophobia and fanaticism, and which demands equal respect towards religions. The anti-colonial elite, Nandy argued, had relied on this second, non-modern meaning to mobilize a deeply religious society. He criticized what he called official secularism for refusing to distinguish tolerant from intolerant forms of religion, for truncating the political personality of believers by admitting only part of their selves into the public domain, and for treating believers as bearers of an inferior political consciousness.

=== Other Views ===
Writing in The Wall Street Journal, Sadanand Dhume criticises Indian "Secularism" as a fraud and a failure, since it isn't really "secularism" as it is understood in the western world (as separation of religion and state) but more along the lines of religious appeasement. He writes that the flawed understanding of secularism among India's left wing intelligentsia has led Indian politicians to pander to religious leaders and preachers including Zakir Naik, and has led India to take a soft stand against Islamic terrorism, religious militancy and communal disharmony in general.

Historian Ronald Inden writes:

Nehru's India was supposed to be committed to 'secularism'. The idea here in its weaker publicly reiterated form was that the government would not interfere in 'personal' religious matters and would create circumstances in which people of all religions could live in harmony. The idea in its stronger, unofficially stated form was that in order to modernise, India would have to set aside centuries of traditional religious ignorance and superstition and eventually eliminate Hinduism and Islam from people's lives altogether. After Independence, governments implemented secularism mostly by refusing to recognise the religious pasts of Indian nationalism, whether Hindu or Muslim, and at the same time (inconsistently) by retaining Muslim 'personal law' .

Amartya Sen, the Indian Nobel Laureate, suggests that secularism in the political – as opposed to ecclesiastical – sense requires the separation of the state from any particular religious order. This, claims Sen, can be interpreted in at least two different ways: "The first view argues the state be equidistant from all religions – refusing to take sides and having a neutral attitude towards them. The second view insists that the state must not have any relation at all with any religion," quotes Minhaz Merchant. In both interpretations, secularism goes against giving any religion a privileged position in the activities of the state. Sen argues that the first form is more suited to India, where there is no demand that the state stay clear of any association with any religious matter whatsoever. Rather what is needed is to make sure that in so far as the state has to deal with different religions and members of different religious communities, there must be a basic symmetry of treatment. Sen does not claim that modern India is symmetric in its treatment or offer any views of whether acceptance of sharia in matters such as child marriage is equivalent to having a neutral attitude towards a religion. Critics of Sen claim that secularism, as practised in India, is not the secularism of first or second variety Sen enumerates.

Pakistani columnist Farman Nawaz in his article "Why Indian Muslim Ullema are not popular in Pakistan?" states "Maulana Arshad Madani stated that seventy years ago the cause of division of India was sectarianism and if today again the same temptation will raise its head then results will be the same. Maulana Arshad Madani considers secularism inevitable for the unity of India." Maulana Arshad Madani is a staunch critic of sectarianism in India. He is of the opinion that India was divided in 1947 because of sectarianism. He suggests that secularism is inevitable for the solidarity and integrity of India.

Professor of Medieval History at Jawaharlal Nehru University and The Hindu columnist Harbans Mukhia suggests that there was a dichotomy between secularism and communalism that took centerstage during India's freedom struggle. In Mukhia's view, while secularism and communalism were each other’s negation historically, with the Congress embodying the former and the Muslim League the latter, conceptually they both shared the category of community. To him, the Congress' conception of secularism was "just about half a step ahead of communalism".

Over the decades since Independence, the Congress practised its secularism by largely ignoring minority communalism as well as succumbing to majority communalism without ever positing that the two are inseparable. Matters came to a head when the locks on the Babri Masjid were opened and the very humane judgment of the Supreme Court in the Shah Bano case was overthrown through a regressive legislation. It is this dual surrender that gave a spurt to the BJP’s challenge to the Congress’s secularism and to the recentring of communal antagonism in the polity. Secularism, pseudo-secularism, communalism, etc. in India are essentially political constructs.

== See also ==
- George Holyoake, who coined the term in modern sense.
- Freedom of religion in India
- Indian Humanist Union
- Irreligion in India
- Sarva Dharma Sama Bhava
