= Principled Distance =

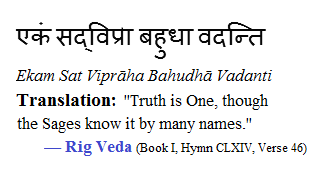
Hinduism is agreed to be tolerant towards other faith as can be seen in this verse from the Rig Veda.

Principled Distance is a new model of secularism proposed by Rajeev Bhargava. The separation of government institutions and persons mandated to represent the state from religious institutions and religious dignitaries. According to Bhargava, Indian secularism did not erect a strict wall of separation, but proposed a 'principled distance' between state and religion. Moreover, by balancing the claims of individuals and religious communities, it never intended a bludgeoning privatization of religion. In India, secularism means equal treatment of all religions. Religion in India continues to assert its political authority in matters of personal law. The western model of secularism is criticized in India for being unsuited to religiously heterogeneous societies. Bhargava argued that since the Western model was developed at a time when society was more religiously homogeneous, a new model is needed in the era of globalization, where society is becoming more religiously heterogeneous. He even argued that since Europe itself is no longer as religiously homogeneous as it once was, the West should also follow the principled distance model, which on one hand respects the diversity, and at the same time empowers the state to interfere in cases of discrimination in the name of religion.

== Examples of Principled Distance ==
Article 29 & 30 in Constitution of India seeks a principled distance between minorities as well as majority to protect, preserve and propagate their cultural, linguistic and religious identity through establishment of cultural and education institutions.

The Haj subsidy is a subsidy given to Indian Muslim Hajj pilgrims by the Government of India. The program has its origins in British colonial era. In post-colonial era, the Nehru government expanded the program in 1959 with the Hajj Act. The subsidy and taxpayer funded arrangements initially applied to Muslim Indian pilgrims traveling for religious reasons to Saudi Arabia, Syria, Iraq, Iran and Jordan. Since 1973, pilgrims applying through the Haj Committee of India are offered a concessionary fare on Air India. The subsidy was withdrawn on January 16, 2018 as per the orders of the Supreme Court of India.

Central Wakf Council, India is an Indian statutory body established in 1964 by the Government of India under Wakf Act, 1954 (now a sub section the Wakf Act, 1995) for the purpose of advising it on matters pertaining to working of the State Wakf Boards and proper administration of the Wakfs in the country. Wakf is a permanent dedication of movable or immovable properties for religious, pious or charitable purposes as recognized by Muslim Law, given by philanthropists. The grant is known as mushrut-ul-khidmat, while a person making such dedication is known as Wakif.

On one hand there is All India Muslim Personal Law Board (AIMPLB), a non-government organisation constituted in 1973 to adopt suitable strategies for the protection and continued applicability of Muslim Personal Law in India, most importantly, the Muslim Personal Law (Shariat) Application Act of 1937, providing for the application of the Islamic Law Code of Shariat to Muslims in India in personal affairs. The Board presents itself as the leading body of Muslim opinion in India. A role for which it has been criticised as well as supported. But on the other hand, through judgement, Supreme Court of India allows Muslims to adapt child. The apex court said on Wednesday that the laws of land has to get primacy over personal law till the country achieves Uniform Civil Code as provided in Article 44 of the Constitution.

== See also ==
- Agnosticism
- Anticlericalism
- Atheism
- Antitheism
- Civil religion
- Clericalism
- Concordat
- Deism
- Freethought
- Humanism
- Ignosticism
- Kemalism
- Laïcité
- Multiculturalism
- Naturalism
- Nontheism
- Pluralism
- Political Catholicism
- Political religion
- Postsecularism
- Rationalism
- Religious toleration
- Secular humanism
- Secular Review (journal)
- Secular state
- Secular Thought (journal)
- Secularism in Bangladesh
- Secularism in India
- Secularism in Iran
- Secularism in Turkey
- Secularism (South Asia)
- Secularity
- Secularization
- Separation of church and state
- Six Arrows of Kemal Atatürk
- State atheism
- Theocracy
