= Tufail Ahmad =

British journalist

- Born: West Champaran, Bihar, India
- Education: Aligarh Muslim University (B.A.); Jawaharlal Nehru University (M.A.); King's College London (M.A.)
- Occupations: journalist, author, commentator

Tufail Ahmad is a British journalist, counter-terrorism expert and political commentator of Indian origin. He has been the Director of the South Asia Studies Project and Senior Fellow at the Middle East Media Research Institute (MEMRI), in Washington, D.C. In his recent writings, he was described as a Contributing Editor at Firstpost and as executive director of the Open Source Institute (OSI), New Delhi. He is currently a Senior Director at MEMRI, and is followed on X (formerly Twitter) by senior editors, diplomats and politicians, including Narendra Modi, the prime minister of India.

== Life and career ==
Tufail was born in the West Champaran district in Bihar, India. He is currently a British citizen.

Tufail has a B.A. (Hons) in Sociology from the Aligarh Muslim University. He further studied Social Systems at Jawaharlal Nehru University and War Studies at the King's College London, receiving M.A. degrees in both. He also holds a Post-Graduate Diploma in Journalism from the Indian Institute of Mass Communication, New Delhi.

He worked in New Delhi for C-voter, Press Trust of India and Inomy Media. Subsequently, he worked as an editor with the BBC Urdu Service in London for approximately eight years, focusing on the coverage of Pakistan.

Tufail is currently a Senior Director at the Middle East Media Research Institute (MEMRI) in Washington, D.C. His research is focused on jihadist movements in Afghanistan, Pakistan, India and Bangladesh as well as the counter-terrorism policies of the countries. He also carries out research on issues of cultural and religious freedom in these countries.

== Works ==
Tufail co-edited The Internet Economy of India published by Inomy Media, in 2001.

He writes research reports at MEMRI, regular columns in The New Indian Express and occasional articles in the OPEN magazine. He has liberal views, opposing jihadism and fundamentalism, and encourages Indian Muslims to participate in Indian polity and society. He warns India and Pakistan of their jihadist threats. He is concerned about the Liberal-Left intellectuals aligning with the Islamist forces owing to their supposed zeal in opposing the West.

With the rise of the ISIS, Tufail has been tracking the reactions in the Muslim community and highlighting the calls for reform from within the community.

In early 2016, Tufail Ahmad's book Jihadist Threat To India -- The Case For Islamic Reformation By An Indian Muslim was published in India. The book was launched by Shri Kiren Rijiju, India's federal minister for home affairs, at a ceremony held at the Vivekananda International Foundation (VIF) in New Delhi on March 31, 2016. At the book launch, other eminent personalities who spoke alongside Rijiju included: former Indian Army chief General N.C. Vij, former Research & Analysis Wing (RAW) chief Shri Vikram Sood, former Indian Army commander Lt.-Gen. Ata Hasnain, and Pakistan affairs expert Sushan Sareen.

Speaking at the launch of his book, Ahmad accused the Indian state of handing over its responsibility of teaching Muslim children to madrassas (Islamic seminaries) which he described as counter-liberty movements; and while stressing the need for Islamic Reformation, he called for teaching mathematics, economics and physics to Muslim girls from Grade 1 through Grade 12.

== Advocacy of Reform ==
On 30 November 2016, Tufail Ahmad unveiled a 12-point document, in which he proposed a "blueprint" for a Uniform Civil Code for India. The document was named "the Universal Bill of Rights for the Indian Citizen" and was written by Ahmad in collaboration with two others, Satya Prakash and Siddharth Singh. Effectively, Tufail Ahmad is the first Indian to have authored a Uniform Civil Code to further debate about this subject among Indians.

In January 2018, Ahmad critiqued the Muslim Women (Protection of Rights on Marriage) Bill, 2017 passed by the Lok Sabha, the lower house of Parliament. Ahmad said the bill fell short of reform for Muslims. With the aid of Smita Dikshit, a legal counsel practicing in the Supreme Court, Ahmad authored an alternative bill to raise awareness about Muslim issues called The Muslim Family Reforms Bill, 2018.

== Reception ==
Tufail Ahmad's employer, MEMRI, is alleged to be a pro-Israeli organisation that selectively presents Muslim sources to show them in a negative light. Zafarul Islam Khan, the editor of The Milli Gazette, accused Ahmad of promoting Islamophobic views and likened him to Taslima Nasreen and Tarek Fateh. Tufail Ahmad has accused his critics Zafarul Islam and Shahid Siddiqui of promoting a jihadist mindset among Indian Muslims through the Urdu-language media.
