= Uniform Civil Code of Uttarakhand Act, 2024 =

Recently passed State Legislation

The Uniform Civil Code of Uttarakhand Act, 2024

Legislative Assembly of Uttarakhand
- Long title: An Act to govern and regulate the laws relating to marriage and divorce, succession, live-in relationships and matters related thereto.
- Citation: Act No. 01 of 2024
- Territorial extent: Uttarakhand
- Enacted by: Legislative Assembly of Uttarakhand
- Enacted: 7 February 2024

Legislative history
- Bill title: The Uniform Civil Code of Uttarakhand Bill, 2024
- Bill citation: Bill No. 02 of 2024
- Introduced by: Pushkar Singh Dhami
- Introduced: 7 February 2024
- Voting summary: 70 voted for; None voted against; None abstained
- Finally passed both chambers: 7 February 2024

Summary
- A Law to govern and regulate the laws relating to marriage and divorce, succession, live-in relationships and matters related thereto.
- Status: In force

The Uniform Civil Code of Uttarakhand Act, 2024 is a piece of legislation designed to establish a unified set of personal laws governing matters such as marriage, divorce, adoption, inheritance, and maintenance for all citizens of Uttarakhand, irrespective of their religion, gender, caste, or sex.

Uttarakhand is the first state in India to enact a law on the Uniform Civil Code. Chief Minister Pushkar Singh Dhami described it as a "historic moment" for the nation.

== Background ==
Article 44 of the Constitution of India states that the State shall endeavor to implement a Uniform Civil Code. The implementation of the Uniform Civil Code in Uttarakhand was one of the key promises made by the Bharatiya Janata Party during the 2022 Uttarakhand Legislative Assembly elections.

In 2022, the Government of Uttarakhand established a five-member expert committee, chaired by former Supreme Court judge Ranjana Prakash Desai, to study and draft a Uniform Civil Code (UCC) law for the state.

The committee sought public suggestions and received a total of 60,810 responses regarding the drafting and implementation of the Uniform Civil Code. On 2 February 2024, the committee submitted its report to Chief Minister Pushkar Singh Dhami.

On 4 February 2024, the Council of Ministers, led by Chief Minister Pushkar Singh Dhami, approved the committee's report.

== Provisions ==
The Uniform Civil Code Act, 2024, implemented in Uttarakhand, applies to all individuals residing in the state, except members of Scheduled Tribes. Below is a breakdown of its key provisions:

Marriage and Divorce:

- Minimum Marriageable Age: Establishes a common minimum marriageable age for all genders—18 years for women and 21 years for men—in alignment with existing national legislation.
- Registration of Marriages: Requires compulsory registration of all marriages with designated authorities to ensure legal recognition and transparency.
- Grounds for Divorce: Specifies uniform grounds for divorce applicable to all communities, addressing issues such as cruelty, adultery, desertion, and mental illness.
- Alimony and Maintenance: Includes provisions for spousal and child maintenance after divorce, ensuring financial support and promoting the welfare of dependents.

Inheritance and Succession:

- Equal Rights: Grants equal inheritance rights to sons and daughters, eliminating the distinction between ancestral and self-acquired property. This ensures gender equality and promotes fair distribution of inherited assets.
- Succession Rules: Establishes a uniform set of rules for inheritance based on the relationship to the deceased, irrespective of religious affiliation. This simplifies legal procedures and resolves complexities arising from diverse personal laws.

Live-in Relationships:

- Registration: Mandates the registration of live-in relationships, granting them legal recognition and protecting the rights of individuals in such partnerships.
- Rights of Children: Ensures the rights of children born to partners in registered live-in relationships, including access to inheritance, maintenance, and other legal benefits.
- Maintenance for Deserted Partners: Includes provisions for maintenance to partners deserted in live-in relationships, ensuring their financial security and addressing potential exploitation.

Additional Provisions:

- Prohibition of Polygamy: Prohibits the practice of polygamy for all individuals, promoting monogamy and gender equality.
- Child Marriage Ban: Reinforces the existing national ban on child marriage, protecting children from harmful traditional practices.
- Jurisdiction of Courts: Specifies the jurisdiction of courts in matters related to marriage, divorce, inheritance, and maintenance under the Uniform Civil Code.

Exemptions:

- Scheduled Tribes: The Act exempts members of Scheduled Tribes from its provisions, allowing them to continue following their customary laws in personal matters.

== Reactions ==
The passage of the UCC Act in Uttarakhand has elicited a wide range of reactions, both positive and negative. The BJP and its allies view the UCC as a progressive step toward achieving equality and eliminating discriminatory practices based on religion. They believe it will promote national integration and simplify the legal system. On the other hand, the opposition argues that the UCC infringes on the religious and cultural rights of minorities, particularly concerning marriage, inheritance, and personal laws. They raise concerns that it could homogenize diverse traditions and undermine social harmony.

Chief Minister Dhami termed the passage of the bill as "historic," while the opposition stated that they were not given sufficient time for discussion.

Muslim community leaders have expressed apprehension about the impact of the UCC on their existing personal laws, highlighting concerns about safeguarding their cultural identity and traditions.

The president of the All India Majlis-e-Ittehadul Muslimeen, Asaduddin Owaisi, described the UCC as "an attack" on the religious and cultural rights of minorities, particularly Muslims. He argues that it "imposes a Hindu code" on all citizens, disregarding the diverse personal laws practiced by different communities. He also questions the constitutionality of the UCC, claiming it violates Article 25 and Article 29, which guarantee freedom of religion and cultural rights.
