= Rajeev Bhargava =

Indian Political Theorist and Professor

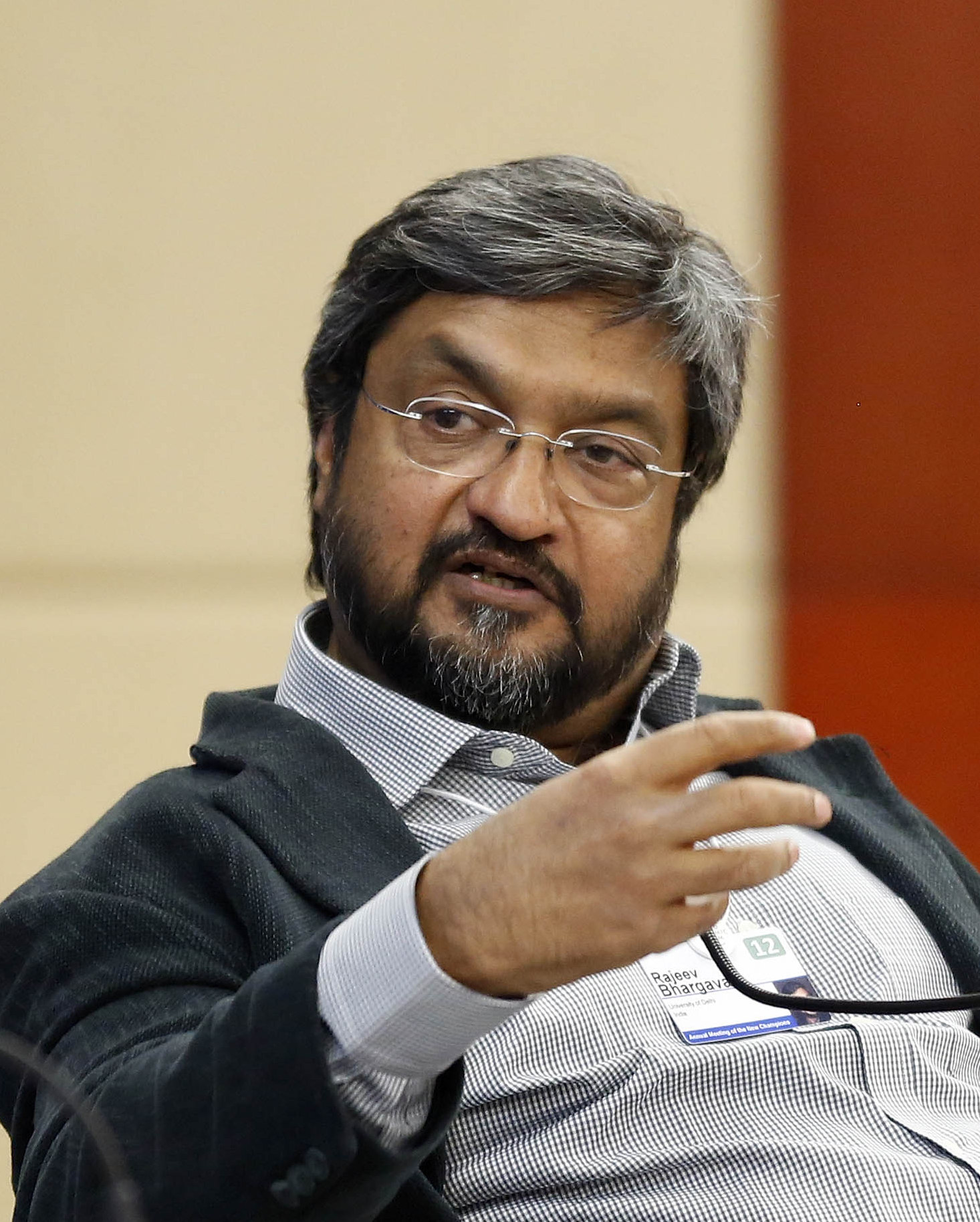
- Bhargava at the World Economic Forum Annual Meeting of the New Champions in 2012
- Born: 27 November 1954 (age 71)
- Education: Delhi University (BA); Oxford University (MPhil, DPhil)
- Occupations: Former Director, Centre for the Study of Developing Societies (2005-2014); political theorist

Rajeev Bhargava (born 27 November 1954) is a noted Indian political theorist, who was professor of political theory at the Jawaharlal Nehru University, Delhi. His works on political theory, multiculturalism, identity politics and secularism have evoked sharp debates.

He is Honorary Fellow and Founder Director, Parekh Institute of Indian Thought, CSDS (Centre for the Study of Developing Societies) Delhi. He has been former director of the Centre between 2007 and 2014. He is also an Honorary Fellow of Balliol College, Oxford.

Bhargava has developed the conception of secularism he calls "principled distance", advanced against both the French and American models of exclusionary separation of church and state: the state, having separated itself from religion, may support some religious practices and inhibit others, intervening or abstaining on the basis of values such as the reduction of inter-religious and intra-religious domination rather than under a rule of strict neutrality or equidistance.

== Education ==
He received his B.A. degree in economics from the University of Delhi, followed by M.Phil. and D.Phil. from Oxford University.

== Career ==
Bhargava started his academic career at St. Stephen's College, Delhi in 1979, in the following year he joined the Jawaharlal Nehru University, Delhi where he worked till 2005, when he joined Centre for the Study of Developing Societies (CSDS), Delhi as a senior fellow and, from 2007 to 2014, was its director. He formally retired in 2019 but continues to be an Honorary Fellow and Director of its Parekh Institute of Indian Thought.

Over the years, he has been faculty fellow in ethics at Harvard University, Leverhulme Fellow at University of Bristol, senior fellow at Institute of Advanced Studies, Jerusalem, fellow, Wissenschaftkolleg, Berlin, fellow, Institute of Human Sciences, Vienna, visiting fellow of the British Academy, Berggruen Fellow, CASBS, Stanford, Tsinghua University, China and NYU between 2015 and 2017, Professorial Fellow, Institute of Social Justice, ACU, Sydney and held the Asia Chair at Sciences Po Paris in 2006. In 2022, he was Senior Research Fellow at the Multiple Secularities project, University of Leipzig.

Bhargava writes a regular column for the Indian national daily, The Hindu. He also served on the Social Sciences jury for the Infosys Prize in 2019. in 2009, Bhargava was awarded the UGC national award for his contribution to political science and in 2011, the Malcolm Adiseshiah award for his contribution to the social sciences.

== Selected works ==
- Individualism in Social Science, (Clarendon Press, Oxford, 1992) This book offers a balanced, subtle critique of methodoloigical individualism.
- Secularism and its critics, (Oxford University Press, 1998) The first major anthology of its kind that sparked international academic interest in secularism.
- Multiculturalism, Liberalism and Democracy (OUP, 1999). This book looks into the cultural dimension of political and political dimensions of identity and culture.
- Politics and Ethics of the Indian Constitution (OUP, 2008). This book examines Indian constitution from the perspective of political theory.
- What is Political Theory why do we need it? (OUP, Delhi, 2010). In this book Bhargava clarifies concepts like secularism, multiculturalism, socialism, individualism and ethnocentrism etc.
- The Promise of India's secular democracy (OUP, Delhi, 2010). This book explores the politics of secularism in India.
- Secular States and Religious Diversity (UBC Press, Vancouver, 2013). He gave the concept of Principled Distance model of secularism as an alternative model to be more suitable for a heterogeneous society like India.
- Politics, Ethics and the Self: Re-reading Gandhi's Hind Swaraj (Routledge, London and New Delhi, 2022). Based on a conference on Hind Swaraj's centenary, this book puts together essays by the most eminent contemporary writers on Gandhi.
- Between Hope and Despair: 100 Ethical Reflections on Contemporary India (Bloomsbury, New Delhi, 2023). This book, written for a wider, non-academic readership, is on the crisis of India's collective ethical identity.
- Bridging the Two Worlds: Comparing Classical Political Thought and Statecraft in India and China (California University Press, 2023), edited with Amitav Acharya, Daniel A. Bell, and Yan Xuetong.
