= National Waqf Development Corporation Limited =

National Waqf Development Corporation Limited is an Indian government agency under Ministry of Minority Affairs . This will undertake development of Waqf properties for the community welfare particularly for Muslims in India. The prime minister Man Mohan Singh unveiled it on 28 January 2014. It has been established as a follow up of the recommendations of Sachar committee report. It work in a joint venture with the States and UT's waqf boards and the Mutawallis. It will have the status of Central Public Sector Enterprises.

== Issue ==
In 2007 there were reports from Kerala indicating many irregularities in transferring of Waqf land or properties to private parties. This resulted in a huge loss to the Indian exchequer amounting to 2 lakh crore rupees. To look into the issue government of India formed Sachar Committee.

== Sachar Committee recommendations ==
Some major points of the report:

- India has largest number of Waqf properties around 4.9 lakhs with approximate income from these properties to 163 crore rupees.
- If these properties are managed and developed properly could fetch around an income of 12000 crore rupees per annum.
- A national level institution should be developed to take care of Waqf properties for community welfare particularly of Muslim community.

== Waqf concepts ==
Waqf means a permanent dedication of a person professing Islam of any movable or immovable property for any purpose recognized by Muslim law as - auspicious, religious or charitable.

Wakif is a person donating property. Once the property is donated the donor loses all the rights over the property and such property cannot be transferred, mortgaged, or alienated without permission of the Waqf board.
