= Rohit Sagar v. State of Uttarakhand =

Indian LGBT Rights Case Law

- Court: Uttarakhand High Court
- Full case name: Rohit Sagar & Anr. versus State of Uttarakhand & Ors.
- Decided: 16 December 2021
- Citation: W. P. (CRL) No. 2254 of 2021

Court membership
- Judges sitting: R. S. Chauhan CJ and N. S. Dhanik J

Case opinions
- The adults have a fundamental right to choose their own life-partners, despite the opposition voiced by the family members.
- Decision by: R. S. Chauhan CJ and N. S. Dhanik J

Keywords
- Cohabitation Rights, Same-sex Relationship

Rohit Sagar & Anr. versus State of Uttarakhand & Ors. (2021), a decision of the Uttarakhand High Court, established the right of legal adults to select their own partners and instructed the police to ensure the couple's safety and safeguard their property.

== Background ==
Rohit Sagar and his partner Mohit Goyal, who are in a same-sex relationship, reside together in Rudrapur, Uttarakhand. However, they have faced resistance to their relationship from their respective families. Due to ongoing threats of serious repercussions from their family members, the couple lodged a formal complaint with both the Senior Superintendent of Police of Udham Singh Nagar district and the Station House Officer of Police Station No. 2, Rudrapur. However, as there has been no proactive action taken by the police authorities to safeguard the couple's lives and property, they have initiated a writ petition in the Uttarakhand High Court to seek a protective order.

== Opinion of the Court ==
The Bench upheld that adults who have attained the age of majority hold an inherent right to choose their life partners, even when confronted with objections from their families, and thus, the families of the couple should not be allowed to intimidate or harm the petitioners. Consequently, the Bench instructed the Senior Superintendent of Police for District Udham Singh Nagar to promptly ensure police protection for both the petitioners, encompassing not only their lives but also the safeguarding of their property.

The verdict of the Bench noticeably lacks legal precedents, thorough analysis, and comprehensive reasoning to substantiate its conclusions.

== Related Cases ==
=== High Court Cases ===
==== Sultana Mirza v. State of Uttar Pradesh ====
In the related case of Sultana Mirza v. State of Uttar Pradesh (2020), a same-sex couple residing together, approached the Allahabad High Court seeking protection against threat to their life and liberty by family members and the immediate society. A two-judge Bench of the Allahabad High Court, guided by the Supreme Court's precedent in Navtej Singh Johar v. Union of India (2018), noted that sexual orientation constitutes an inherent aspect of the constitutional rights to liberty, dignity, privacy, personal autonomy, and equality. In contrast to the case of Rohit Sagar v. State of Uttarakhand, the judgment in Sultana Mirza v. State of Uttar Pradesh explicitly references the constitutional right to privacy, providing added support for safeguarding against unwarranted intrusions, in addition to offering protection against physical threats and violations.

While ordering police protection for the couple, in contrast to the Rohit Sagar v. State of Uttarakhand case, the Bench in the Sultana Mirza v. State of Uttar Pradesh case drew upon the Supreme Court's precedent in Navtej Singh Johar v. Union of India, acknowledging the tate's dual obligation pertaining to sexual orientation—preventing discrimination and actively safeguarding the rights of same-sex couples, thereby contributing to the formation of a consistent legal precedent concerning sexual orientation and rights.

== See also ==
- LGBT rights in India
- Deepika Singh v. Central Administrative Tribunal (2022)
- Adhila Nasarin v. State Commissioner of Police (2022)
- Navtej Singh Johar v. Union of India (2018)
