= Uniform Civil Code =

Proposition for uniform codified personal law in India that is not respect to religion

The Uniform Civil Code is a proposal in India to formulate and implement personal laws of citizens which apply equally to all citizens, regardless of their religion. Currently, personal laws of different religious communities are governed by their religious scriptures. Personal laws cover marriage, divorce, inheritance, adoption and maintenance. While articles 25-28 of the Indian Constitution guarantee religious freedom to Indian citizens and allow religious groups to maintain their own affairs, article 44 expects the Indian state to apply directive principles and common law uniformly to all Indian citizens when formulating national policies.

Personal laws were first framed during the British Raj, mainly for Hindu and Muslim subjects. The British feared opposition from community leaders and refrained from further interfering within this domestic sphere. The Indian state of Goa was separate from British India during the colonial rule in the erstwhile Portuguese Goa and Daman, and so retained a common family law known as the Goa civil code and thus was the only state in India with a uniform civil code prior to 2024, with Uttarakhand now taking the charge. Following India's independence, Hindu code bills were introduced which largely codified and reformed personal laws in various sects among Indian religions like Buddhists, Hindus, Jains and Sikhs but they exempted Christians, Jews, Muslims and Parsis.

UCC emerged as a crucial topic of interest in Indian politics following the Shah Bano case in 1985. The debate arose on the question of making certain laws applicable to all citizens without abridging the fundamental right to practice religious functions. The debate then focused on the Muslim personal law, which is partially based on Sharia, permitting unilateral divorce and polygamy. A UCC bill was proposed twice, in 2019 and 2020, but was withdrawn both the times without introduction in the parliament. As of 2020, the bill is reported to be under discussion between the BJP and the Rashtriya Swayamsevak Sangh (RSS). Many opposition parties and BJP's allies from the National Democratic Alliance (NDA) have opposed the Uniform Civil Code, especially from Northeast India, claiming that it will go against the "idea of India" and will end special privileges of tribal communities after renewed calls by Prime Minister Narendra Modi in June 2023 about implementing a UCC.

== History ==
=== British India (1858–1947) ===
The Lex Loci Report of October 1840 emphasised the importance and necessity of uniformity in codification of Indian law, relating to crimes, evidences and contract but it recommended that personal laws of Hindus and Muslims should be kept outside such codification. According to their understanding of religious divisions in India, the British separated this sphere which would be governed by religious scriptures and customs of the various communities (Hindus, Muslims, Christians and later Parsis). These laws were applied by the local courts or panchayats when dealing with regular cases involving civil disputes between people of the same religion; the State would only intervene in exceptional cases. Thus, the British let the Indian public have the benefit of self-government in their own domestic matters with the Queen's 1859 Proclamation promising absolute non-interference in religious matters. The personal laws involved inheritance, succession, marriage and religious ceremonies. The public sphere was governed by the British and Anglo-Indian law in terms of crime, land relations, laws of contract and evidence—all this applied equally to every citizen irrespective of religion.

Throughout the country, there was a variation in preference for scriptural or customary laws because in many Hindu and Muslim communities, these were sometimes at conflict; such instances were present in communities like the Jats and the Dravidians. The Shudras, for instance, allowed widow remarriage—completely contrary to the scriptural Hindu law. The Hindu laws got preference because of their relative ease in implementation, preference for such a Brahminical system by both British and Indian judges and their fear of opposition from the high caste Hindus. The difficulty in investigating each specific practice of any community, case-by-case, made customary laws harder to implement. Towards the end of the nineteenth century, favouring local opinion, the recognition of individual customs and traditions increased.

The Muslim Personal law (based on Sharia law), was not strictly enforced as compared to the Hindu law. It had no uniformity in its application at lower courts and was severely restricted because of bureaucratic procedures. This led to the customary law, which was often more discriminatory against women, to be applied over it. Women, mainly in northern and western India, often were restrained from property inheritance and dowry settlements, both of which the Sharia provides. Due to pressure from the Muslim elite, the Shariat law of 1937 was passed which stipulated that all Indian Muslims would be governed by Islamic laws on marriage, divorce, maintenance, adoption, succession and inheritance.

==== Legislative reforms ====
Certain Hindu customs prevalent at the time discriminated against women by depriving them of inheritance, remarriage and divorce. Their condition, especially that of Hindu widows and daughters, was poor due to this and other prevalent customs. The British and social reformers like Ishwar Chandra Vidyasagar were instrumental in outlawing such customs by getting reforms passed through legislative processes. Since the British feared opposition from orthodox community leaders, only the Indian Succession Act 1865, which was also one of the first laws to ensure women's economic security, attempted to shift the personal laws to the realm of civil. The Indian Marriage Act 1864 had procedures and reforms solely for Christian marriages.

There were law reforms passed which were beneficial to women like the Hindu Widow Remarriage Act of 1856, Married Women's Property Act of 1923 and the Hindu Inheritance (Removal of Disabilities) Act, 1928, which in a significant move, permitted a Hindu woman's right to property.

The call for equal rights for women was only at its initial stages in India at that time and the reluctance of the British government further deterred the passing of such reforms. The All India Women's Conference (AIWC) expressed its disappointment with the male-dominated legislature and Lakshmi Menon said in an AIWC conference in 1933, "If we are to seek divorce in court, we are to state that we are not Hindus, and are not guided by Hindu law. The members in the Legislative assembly who are men will not help us in bringing any drastic changes which will be of benefit to us." The women's organisations demanded a uniform civil code to replace the existing personal laws, basing it on the Karachi Congress resolution which guaranteed gender-equality.

The passing of the Hindu Women's right to Property Act of 1937, also known as the Deshmukh bill, led to the formation of the B. N. Rau committee, which was set up to determine the necessity of common Hindu laws. The committee concluded that it was time of a uniform civil code, which would give equal rights to women keeping with the modern trends of society but their focus was primarily on reforming the Hindu law in accordance with the scriptures. The committee reviewed the 1937 Act and recommended a civil code of marriage and succession; it was set up again in 1944 and send its report to the Indian Parliament in 1947.

The Special Marriage Act, which gave the Indian citizens an option of a civil marriage, was first enacted in 1872. It had a limited application because it required those involved to renounce their religion and was applicable mostly to non-Hindus. The later Special Marriage (Amendment) Act, 1923 permitted Hindus, Buddhists, Sikhs and Jains to marry either under their personal law or under the act without renouncing their religion as well as retaining their succession rights.

=== Hindu Code Bill and addition to the Directive Principles ===
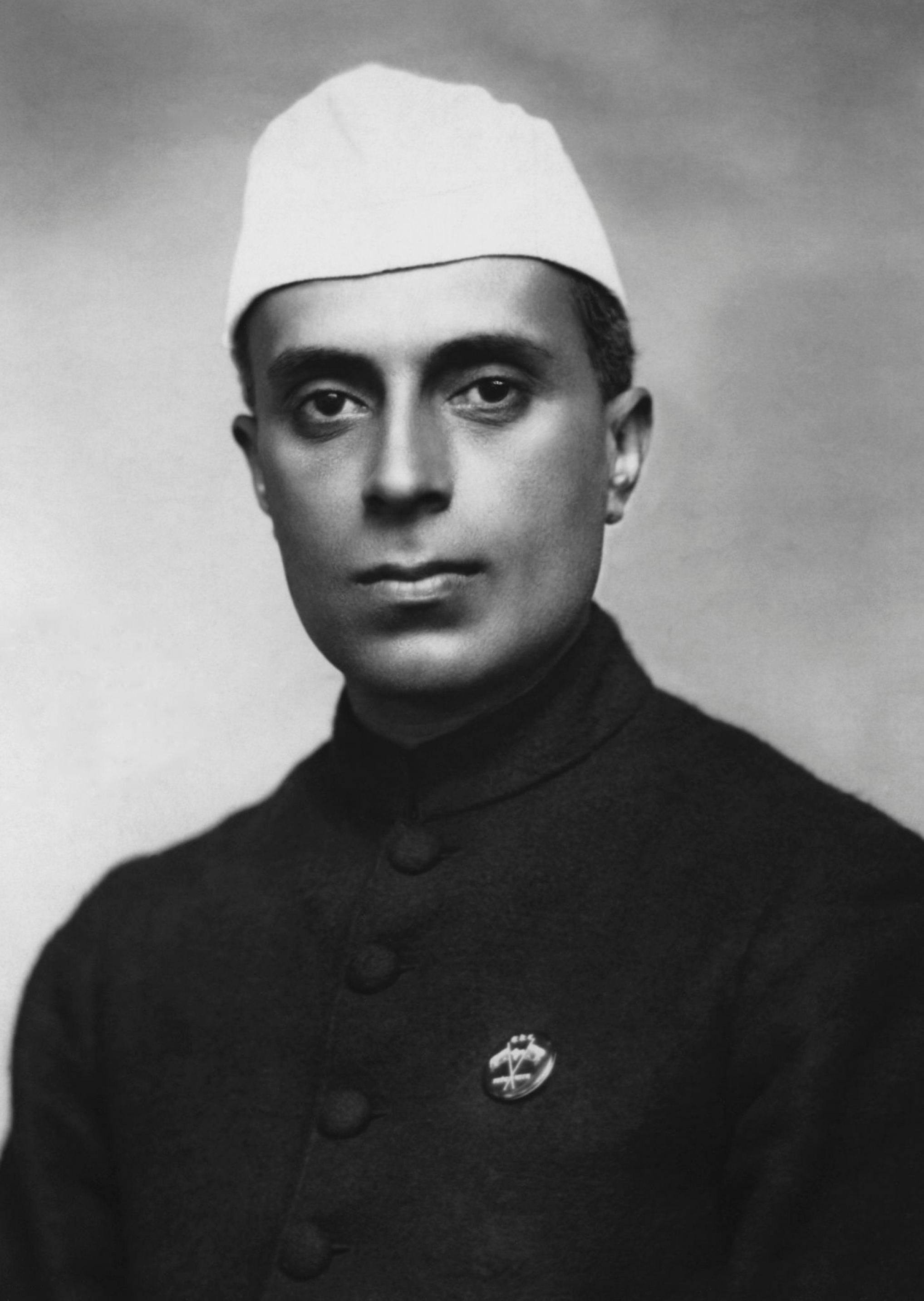
Jawaharlal Nehru supported a uniform civil code but he had to face opposition from other leaders

The Indian Parliament discussed the report of the Hindu law committee during the 1948–1951 and 1951–1954 sessions. The first Prime Minister of the Indian republic, Jawaharlal Nehru, his supporters and women members wanted a uniform civil code to be implemented. As Law Minister, B. R. Ambedkar was in charge of presenting the details of this bill. It was found that the orthodox Hindu laws were pertaining only to a specific school and tradition because monogamy, divorce and the widow's right to inherit property were present in the Shashtras. A Civil Code of western inspiration was recommended by Ambedkar. Ambedkar's frequent attack on the Hindu laws and dislike for the upper castes made him unpopular in the parliament. He had done research on the religious texts and considered the Hindu society structure flawed. According to him, only law reforms could save it and the Code bill was this opportunity. He thus faced severe criticism from the opposition. Nehru later supported Ambedkar's reforms but did not share his negative view on Hindu society.

The Hindu bill itself received much criticism and the main provisions opposed were those concerning monogamy, divorce, abolition of coparcenaries (women inheriting a shared title) and inheritance to daughters. The first President of the country, Rajendra Prasad, opposed these reforms; others included the Congress party president Vallabhbhai Patel, a few senior members and the Hindu fundamentalists within Indian National Congress. The women members of the parliament, who previously supported this, in a significant political move reversed their position and backed the Hindu law reform; they feared allying with the fundamentalists would cause a further setback to their rights.

Thus, a lesser version of this bill was passed by the parliament in 1956, in the form of four separate acts, the Hindu Marriage Act, Succession Act, Minority and Guardianship Act and Adoptions and Maintenance Act. It was decided to add the implementation of a uniform civil code in Article 44 of the Directive principles of the Constitution specifying, "The State shall endeavour to secure for citizens a uniform civil code throughout the territory of India." This was opposed by women members like Rajkumari Amrit Kaur and Hansa Mehta. According to academic Paula Banerjee, this move was to make sure it would never be addressed. Aparna Mahanta writes, "failure of the Indian state to provide a uniform civil code, consistent with its democratic secular and socialist declarations, further illustrates the modern state's accommodation of the traditional interests of a patriarchal society".

=== Later years and Special Marriage Act ===
The Hindu code bill failed to control the prevalent gender discrimination. The law on divorce were framed giving both partners equal voice but majority of its implementation involved those initiated by men. Since the Act applied only to Hindus, women from the other communities remained subordinated. For instance, Muslim women, under the Muslim Personal Law, could not inherit agricultural land. Nehru accepted that the bill was not complete and perfect, but was cautious about implementing drastic changes which could stir up specific communities. He agreed that it lacked any substantial reforms but felt it was an "outstanding achievement" of his time. He had a significant role in getting the Hindu Code bill passed and laid down women-equality as an ideal to be pursued in Indian politics, which was eventually accepted by the previous critics of the bill. Uniform civil code, for him, was a necessity for the whole country but he did not want it to forced upon any community, especially if they were not ready for such a reform. According to him, such a lack of uniformity was preferable since it would be ineffective if implemented. Thus, his vision of family law uniformity was not applied and was added to the Directive principles of the Constitution.

The Special Marriage Act, 1954, provides a form of civil marriage to any citizen irrespective of religion, thus permitting any Indian to have their marriage outside the realm of any specific religious personal law. The law applied to all of India, except Jammu and Kashmir. In many respects, the act was almost identical to the Hindu Marriage Act of 1955, which gives some idea as to how secularised the law regarding Hindus had become. The Special Marriage Act allowed Muslims to marry under it and thereby retain the protections, generally beneficial to Muslim women, that could not be found in the personal law. Under this act polygamy was illegal, and inheritance and succession would be governed by the Indian Succession Act, rather than the respective Muslim Personal Law. Divorce also would be governed by the secular law, and maintenance of a divorced wife would be along the lines set down in the civil law.

== Significance of Shah Bano case ==
After the passing of the Hindu Code bill, the personal laws in India had two major areas of application: the common Indian citizens and the Muslim community, whose laws were kept away from any reforms. The frequent conflict between secular and religious authorities over the issue of uniform civil code eventually decreased, until the 1985 Shah Bano case. Bano was a 73-year-old woman who sought maintenance from her husband, Muhammad Ahmad Khan. He had divorced her after 40 years of marriage by triple Talaaq (saying "I divorce thee" three times) and denied her regular maintenance; this sort of unilateral divorce was permitted under the Muslim Personal Law. She was initially granted maintenance by the verdict of a local court in 1980. Khan, a lawyer himself, challenged this decision, taking it to the Supreme Court, saying that he had fulfilled all his obligations under Islamic law. The Supreme Court ruled in favor of Shah Bano in 1985 under the "maintenance of wives, children and parents" provision (Section 125) of the All India Criminal Code, which applied to all citizens irrespective of religion. It further recommended that a uniform civil code be set up, stating that a uniform civil code would promote national integration by eliminating conflicting loyalties to laws with divergent ideologies. Besides her case, two other Muslim women had previously received maintenance under the Criminal Code in 1979 and 1980.

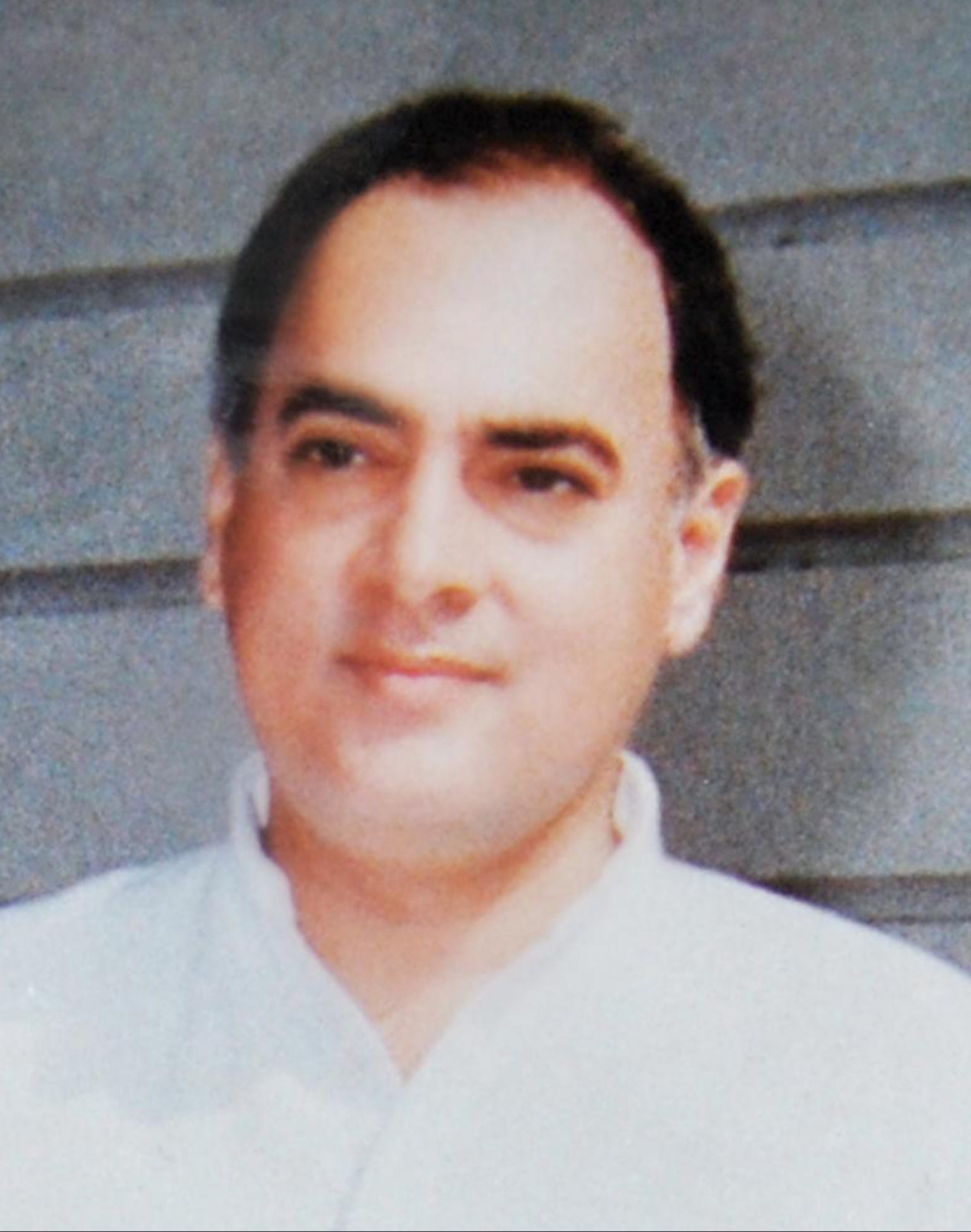
Rajiv Gandhi's Congress party lost state-level elections in 1985 after it endorsed the Supreme Court's decision supporting Bano but later reversed its stand.

The Shah Bano case soon became nationwide political issue and a widely debated controversy. Many conditions, like the Supreme court's recommendation, made her case have such public and political interest. After the 1984 anti-Sikh riots, minorities in India, with Muslims being the largest, felt threatened with the need to safeguard their culture. The All India Muslim Board defended the application of their laws and supported the Muslim conservatives who accused the government of promoting Hindu dominance over every Indian citizen at the expense of minorities. The Criminal Code was seen as a threat to the Muslim Personal Law, which they considered their cultural identity. According to them, the judiciary recommending a uniform civil code was evidence that Hindu values would be imposed over every Indian.

The orthodox Muslims felt that their communal identity was at stake if their personal laws were governed by the judiciary. Rajiv Gandhi's Congress government, which previously had the support of Muslim minorities, lost the local elections in December 1985 because of its endorsement of the Supreme Court's decision. The members of the Muslim board, including Khan, started a campaign for complete autonomy in their personal laws. It soon reached a national level, by consulting legislators, ministers and journalists. The press played a considerable role in sensationalizing this incident.

An independent Muslim Member of Parliament proposed a bill to protect their personal law in the parliament. The Congress reversed its previous position and supported this bill while the Hindu right, the Left, Muslim liberals and women's organisations strongly opposed it. The Muslim Women's (Protection of Rights on Divorce) was passed in 1986, which made Section 125 of the Criminal Procedure Code inapplicable to Muslim women. The debate now centred on the divinity of their personal law. A Muslim member of parliament made a claim emphasising the importance of the cultural community over national by saying that only a Muslim judge could intercede in such cases. Bano later in a statement said that she would withdraw her claim, under immense pressure from orthodox blocs. It also led to the argument defining a woman's right according to her specific community with political leader Jaffar Sharief saying, "today, in the Shah Bano's case, I am finding that many people are more sympathetic towards Muslim women than their own women. This is very strange."

The politicisation led to argument having two major sides: the Congress and Muslim conservatives versus the Hindus, Sikhs, Jains, Buddhists, Parsis, and the Left. In 1987, the Minister of Social Welfare, Rajendra Kumari Bajpai, reported that no women were given maintenance by the Wakf Board in 1986. Women activists highlighted their legal status and according to them, "main problem is that there [are] many laws but women are dominated not by secular laws, not by uniform civil laws, but by religious laws." The legal reversal of introducing the Muslim Women law significantly hampered the nationwide women's movement in the 1980s.

== Current status and opinions ==
=== Definition of the proposal ===
UCC is meant to replace various laws currently applicable to different communities which are inconsistent with each other. These laws include the Hindu Marriage Act, Hindu Succession Act, Indian Christian Marriages Act, Indian Divorce Act, Parsi Marriage and Divorce Act. Meanwhile, certain codes like Sharia (Islamic laws) are not codified and solely based upon their religious scriptures.

The proposals in UCC include monogamy, equal rights for son and daughter over inheritance of paternal property, and gender and religion neutral laws with regards to will, charity, divinity, guardianship and sharing of custody. These proposals may not result in much difference to the status of Hindu society, as they have already been applicable on Hindus through the Hindu Code Bills for decades.

=== Points of view ===
The debate for a uniform civil code, with its diverse implications and concerning secularism in the country, is one of the most controversial issues in twenty-first century Indian politics. The major problems for implementing it are the country's diversity and religious laws, which not only differ sect-wise, but also by community, caste and region.

India is a 'secular' nation which means a separation between religion and state matters. However, 'secularism' in India is defined as equality of all religions and practitioners of all religions before the law. Currently, with a mix of different civil codes, citizens are treated differently by law and by courts based on their religion. The rights of Hindu women are far more progressive (and constitutional, by virtue of being gender-neutral and secular) than those of Muslim women, who are governed by Muslim Personal Law, which is based on the Sharia law.

Women's rights groups have said the issue of a uniform civil code is only based on the rights and security of women, irrespective of its politicisation. The arguments for it are: its mention in Article 44 of the Constitution, need for strengthening the unity and integrity of the country, rejection of different laws for different communities, importance for gender equality, and reforming the archaic personal laws of Muslims—which allow unilateral divorce and polygamy. India is thus among the nations that legally apply the Sharia law. According to Qutub Kidwai, the Muslim Personal Law is "Anglo-Mohammadan" rather than solely Islamic. The Hindu nationalists view this issue in the concept of the Hindu law, which they say, is secular and equal to both sexes. In the country, demanding a uniform civil code can be seen negatively by religious authorities and secular sections of society because of identity politics. The Sangh Parivar and the Bharatiya Janata Party (BJP), one of the two major political parties in India, have taken up this debate to gain Hindu support. However, others have criticised such a debate given the lack of existence of the draft of the bill.

The Indian state of Goa abides by Goa Civil Code. It is a set of civil laws, originally the Portuguese Civil Code, which continues to be implemented even after the Indian annexation of the state in 1961.

Sikhs and Buddhists objected to the wording of Article 25 which terms them as Hindus with personal laws being applied to them. However, this article also guarantees the right of the members of the Sikh faith to bear a Kirpan.

In October 2015, the Supreme Court of India asserted the need for a uniform civil code and said: "This cannot be accepted, otherwise every religion will say it has a right to decide various issues as a matter of its personal law. We don't agree with this at all. It has to be done through a decree of a court". On 30 November 2016, British Indian intellectual Tufail Ahmad unveiled a 12-point draft proposal, citing no effort by the government since 1950. The Law Commission of India stated on 31 August 2018, that a uniform civil code is "neither necessary nor desirable at this stage" in a 185-page consultation paper, adding that secularism cannot contradict the plurality prevalent in the country. On 14 June 2023, the 22nd Law Commission of India requested input from religious organizations and the general public regarding the matter of implementing a Uniform Civil Code (UCC). According to a notification released by the commission, individuals who are interested and willing can express their opinions within a 30-day time frame.

Indian society in pre-independence era had many other considerations like socio-economic status, jati and gotra etc. in case of marriages. While the Hindu Code Bills and other Acts wiped out all such practices in Hindu, Jains, Sikh, Buddhist, Parsi and Christian communities, some conservative sections of these communities had been demanding amendments to their Marriage Acts.

Critics of UCC continue to oppose it as a threat to religious freedom. They consider the abolition of religious laws to be against secularism, and the UCC as a means for BJP to target Muslims under the pretense of progressivism. However, BJP members state that they promote UCC as a means of achieving religious equality and equal rights for women by fending off unfair religious laws.

Legal expert and rights groups suggest amending gender discriminatory laws, rather than implementing a uniform civil code. An example of such a law is Protection of Women from Domestic Violence Act, 2005 which applies to women of all communities without the need for a uniform civil code.

On 17 July 2023, Justice Krishna Murari, who recently concluded his tenure in the Supreme Court of India, said that "uniformity in anyway is beneficial", but before the implementation of the Uniform Civil Code, extensive deliberations and consultations, on a large scale, with the general public should take place.

=== State-level initiatives towards a Uniform Civil Code ===
==== Uttarakhand ====
On 7 February 2024, the Uttarakhand Legislative Assembly passed the The Uniform Civil Code of Uttarakhand Act, 2024, making Uttarakhand the first state in India after independence to enact a Uniform Civil Code. The Bill received the assent of the Governor of Uttarakhand on 28 February 2024, and the Code came into force on 27 January 2025 after the notification of the Uniform Civil Code Rules, 2025. Chief Minister Pushkar Singh Dhami described the enactment as a "historic moment" for the country. The Act excludes members of Scheduled tribes under Article 342 of the Constitution and has attracted criticism on constitutional and technical grounds.

==== Gujarat ====
In March 2026, the Gujarat Legislative Assembly passed the Gujarat Uniform Civil Code, 2026, becoming the second Indian state to enact a Uniform Civil Code after Uttarakhand. The legislation provides a common legal framework governing matters relating to marriage, divorce, succession, inheritance and live-in relationships.

==== Assam ====
On 27 May 2026, the Assam Legislative Assembly passed the Uniform Civil Code, Assam, Bill, 2026, making Assam the third state to enact a Uniform Civil Code and the first in Northeast India. The legislation establishes a common civil framework for matters relating to marriage, divorce, succession and live-in relationships, while exempting members of Scheduled tribes from its provisions.

==== Madhya Pradesh ====
In July 2026, the Madhya Pradesh Legislative Assembly passed the Madhya Pradesh Uniform Civil Code Bill, 2026, becoming the fourth state to enact a Uniform Civil Code. The Bill seeks to establish a uniform legal framework governing marriage, divorce, inheritance, succession and adoption, and also prohibits polygamy.

== Legal status and prospects ==
UCC had been included in BJP's manifesto for the 1998, 2019 and 2024 elections, and was even proposed for introduction in the Parliament for the first time in November 2019 by Narayan Lal Panchariya. Amid protests by other MPs, the bill was soon withdrawn for making certain amendments. The bill was brought for a second time by Kirodi Lal Meena in March 2020, but was not introduced again. As per reports which emerged in 2020, the bill's specifics are being contemplated by the BJP due to its topical differences with the RSS.

A plea was filed in the Delhi High Court which sought establishment of a judicial commission or a high level expert committee to direct the central government to prepare a draft of UCC in three months. In April 2021, a request was filed to transfer the plea to the Supreme Court so that filing of more such pleas throughout various high courts doesn't bring inconsistency throughout India. The draft would further be published on the website for 60 days to facilitate extensive public debate and feedback.

== Reactions ==
Many political parties, ranging from opposition parties to the BJP's own allies in the NDA, have objected to calls for a uniform civil code by the BJP. Furthermore, the idea of the UCC has been opposed by many NGOs and organizations. Some have proposed a feminist code to replace a monolithic view, advocating for a praxis-based approach grounded in the lived realities of women's lives, optionality in governance, and an intersectional perspective.

A group from Nagaland warned that it will burn the houses of all the 60 legislators in the state if the UCC gets implemented in the state. The Nagaland Transparency, Public Rights Advocacy and Direct-Action Organisation opposed the idea of the UCC, saying it will erode local customs and traditions of tribes. The Hynniewtrep Youth Council from the state of Meghalaya said they will request the Law Commission not to implement the UCC.

M. K. Stalin on behalf of the Tamil Nadu government has opposed the UCC, calling it a "serious threat" over his personal views of the policy.

== See also ==
- All India Muslim Personal Law Board
- Hindu code bills
- Religious law
- Family law
- Secularism in India
- Sharia
- Goa Civil Code
- Uniform Civil Code of Uttarakhand Act, 2024
- Uniform Civil Code of Gujarat Act, 2026
- Uniform Civil Code of Assam Act, 2026
- Uniform Civil Code of Madhya Pradesh Act, 2026
- Uniform Civil Code Act Rajasthan Proposal 2026
- Uniform Civil Code Act Maharashtra Proposal 2026
- Uniform Civil Code Act West Bengal Proposal 2026
- Uniform Civil Code Act Chhattisgarh Proposal 2026
