= Awadhi cuisine =

Culinary traditions of Awadh

Awadhi cuisine (Hindi: अवधी पाक-शैली, Urdu: اودھی کھانے) is a cuisine native to the Awadh region in northern India and southern Nepal. Awadhi cuisine can be divided into traditional Awadhi cuisines and Nawabi cuisines. The cooking styles of Lucknow are similar to those of Central Asia, the Middle East, and northern India and Western India with the cuisine comprising both vegetarian and non-vegetarian dishes. The Awadh region has been influenced by Mughal cooking techniques and the cuisine of Lucknow, which bears similarity to those of Central Asia, Kashmir, Punjab and Hyderabad. The city is also known for its Nawabi foods.

== Nawabi cuisine ==
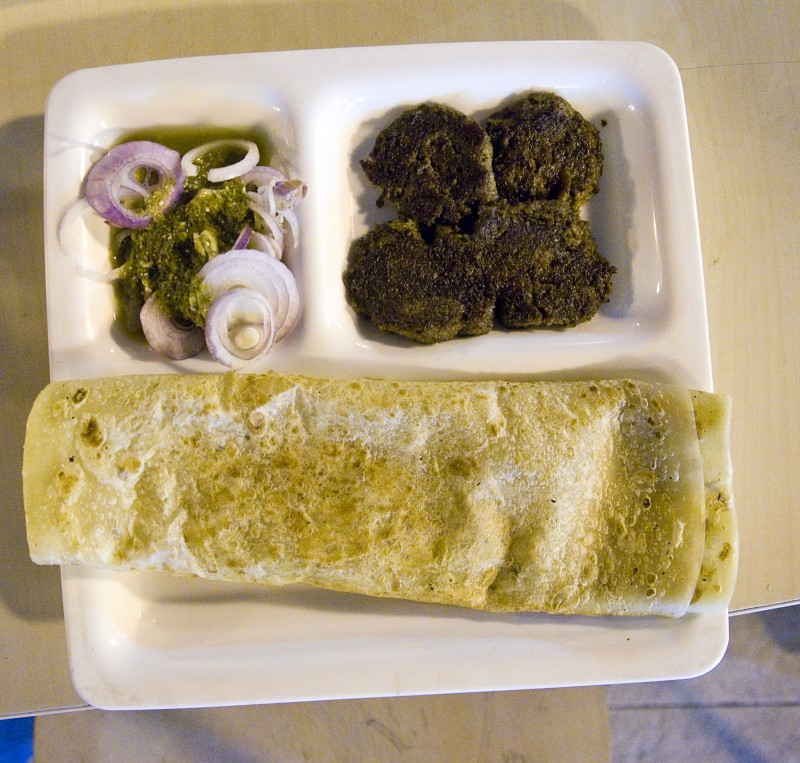
Galouti kebab

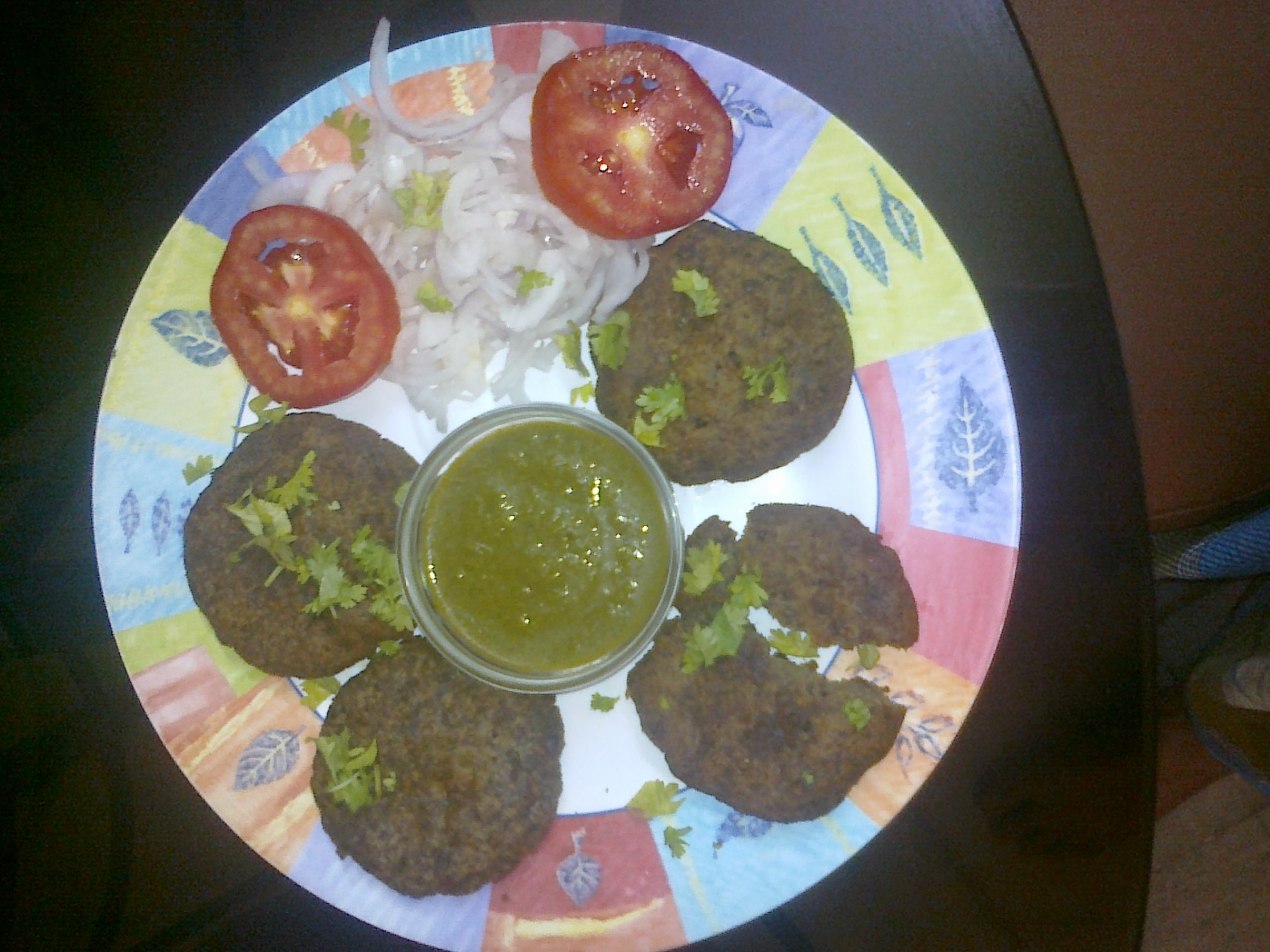
Shami kebab

The bawarchis (chefs) and rakabdars (gourmet cooks) of Awadh invented the dum style of cooking, or the art of cooking over a slow fire, which is strongly associated with Lucknow today. Their meals consisted of elaborate dishes such as kebabs, kormas, biryanis, kaliyas, nahari-kulchas, zarda, sheermal, rumali rotis, and warqi parathas. The richness of Awadh cuisine lies not only in the variety of cuisine but also in the ingredients used like mutton, paneer, and rich spices, which include cardamom and saffron.

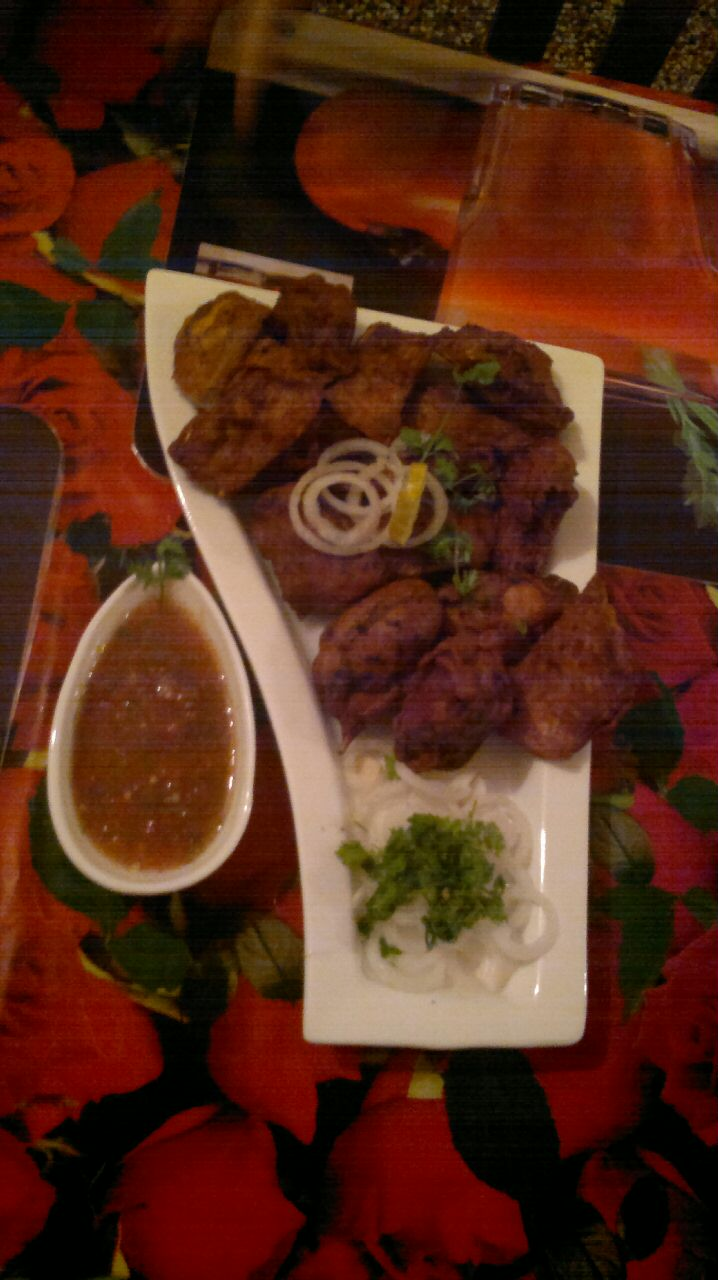
Awadh machli kababs (with fish)

Kebabs are an integral part of Awadhi cuisine. There are several varieties of well-known kebabs in Awadhi cuisine, including kakori kebabs, galawat ke kebabs, shami kebabs, boti kebabs, patili ke kebabs, ghutwa kebabs and seekh kebabs.

The kebabs of Awadhi cuisine are distinct from the kebabs of Punjab insofar as Awadhi kebabs are grilled on a chula and sometimes in a skillet as opposed to grilled in a tandoor in Punjab. Awadhi kebabs are also called "chula" kebabs whereas the kebabs of Punjab are called "tandoori" kebabs.

Awadhi cuisine, although similar to Mughlai cuisine, differs in its approach to cooking. Where Mughal dishes are rich in fats due to extensive use of milk, cream and spices, Awadhi food is more subtle.

== Dishes ==
=== Kebabs ===
Awadhi kebabs include:

The seekh kebab was introduced by the Mughals; it was originally prepared from beef mince on skewers and cooked on charcoal fires. Now lamb mince is preferred for its soft texture.

Established in 1905, tunde ke kabab in Chowk is the most famous outlet for kababs even today. The tunde kabab is so named because it was the speciality of a one-armed chef. The tunde kabab claims to be unique because of the zealously guarded family secret recipe for the masala (homemade spices), prepared by women in the family. It is said to incorporate 160 spices.

The kakori kabab is considered blessed since it was said to be originally made in the place by the same name in the dargah of Shah Abi Ahder Sahib with divine blessings. The meat used is from the tendon of the leg of mutton, combined with khoya and spices. The shami kebab is made from mincemeat, usually with chopped onion, coriander, and green chillies added. The kebabs are round patties filled with spicy mix and tangy raw green mango. The best time to have them is in May, when mangoes are young. When mangoes are not in season, kamrakh or karonda may be substituted for kairi, as both have a tart flavour reminiscent of raw mango. A variant made without any admixture or binding agents and comprising just the minced meat and the spices is the galawat kabab. An unusual offering is the pasanda kebab, piccata of lamb marinated and then sautéed on a griddle. The boti kebab is lamb marinated in yoghurt and cooked on skewers in a tandoor oven. Vegetarian kebabs include dalcha kebab, kathal ke kebab, arbi ke kebab, rajma galoti kebab, and zamikand ke kebab, among others.

=== Curries ===
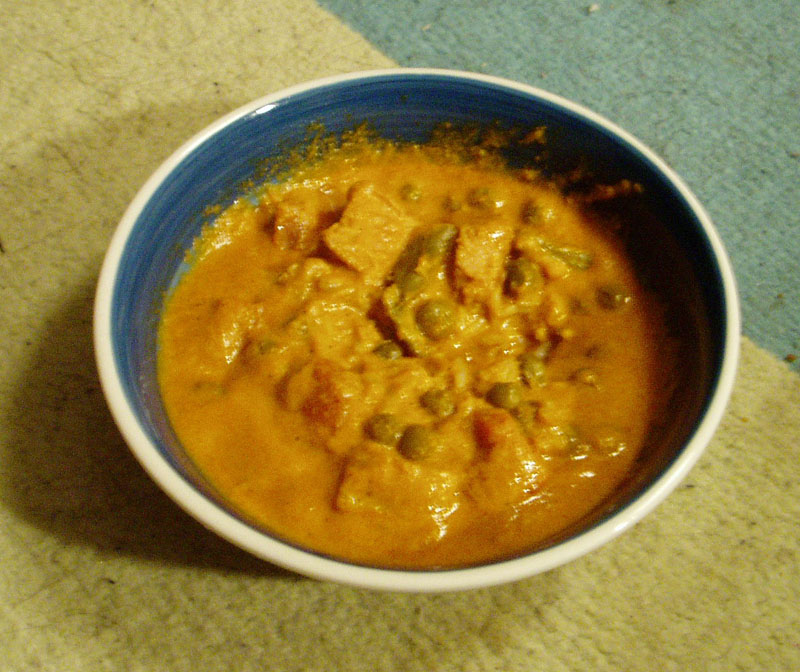
Navratan korma

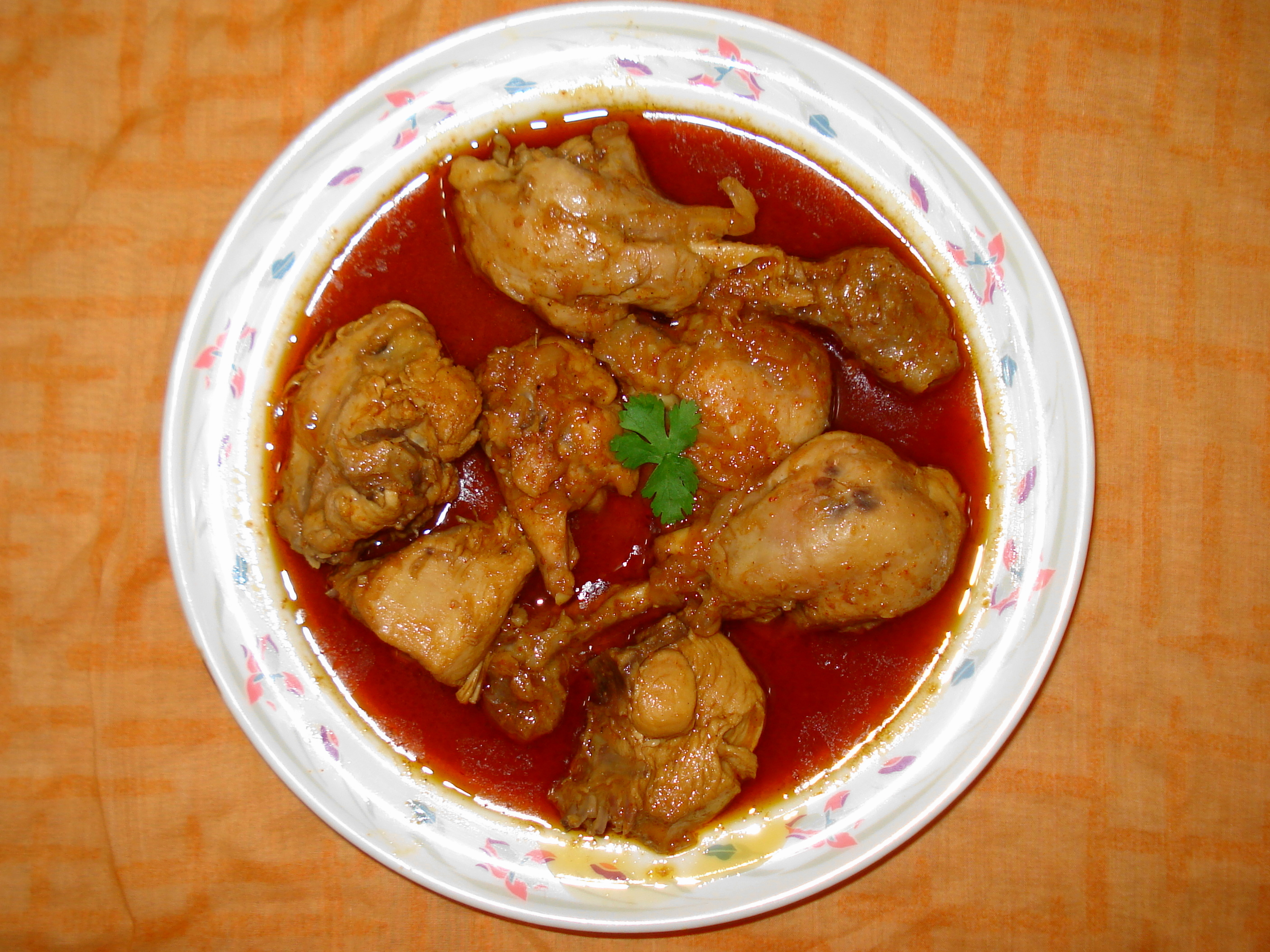
Shahi korma

Korma is the Indian name for the technique of braising meat. It originated in Mughlai cuisine wherein lamb or chicken was braised in velvety, spiced sauces, enriched with ground nuts, cream and butter. While kormas are rich, they are also mild, containing little or no cayenne or chillies. There are both vegetarian (navratan korma) and non-vegetarian (chicken, lamb, beef and fish korma) varieties of korma. Murgh Awadhi korma is a classic from Lucknow.

=== Rice dishes ===
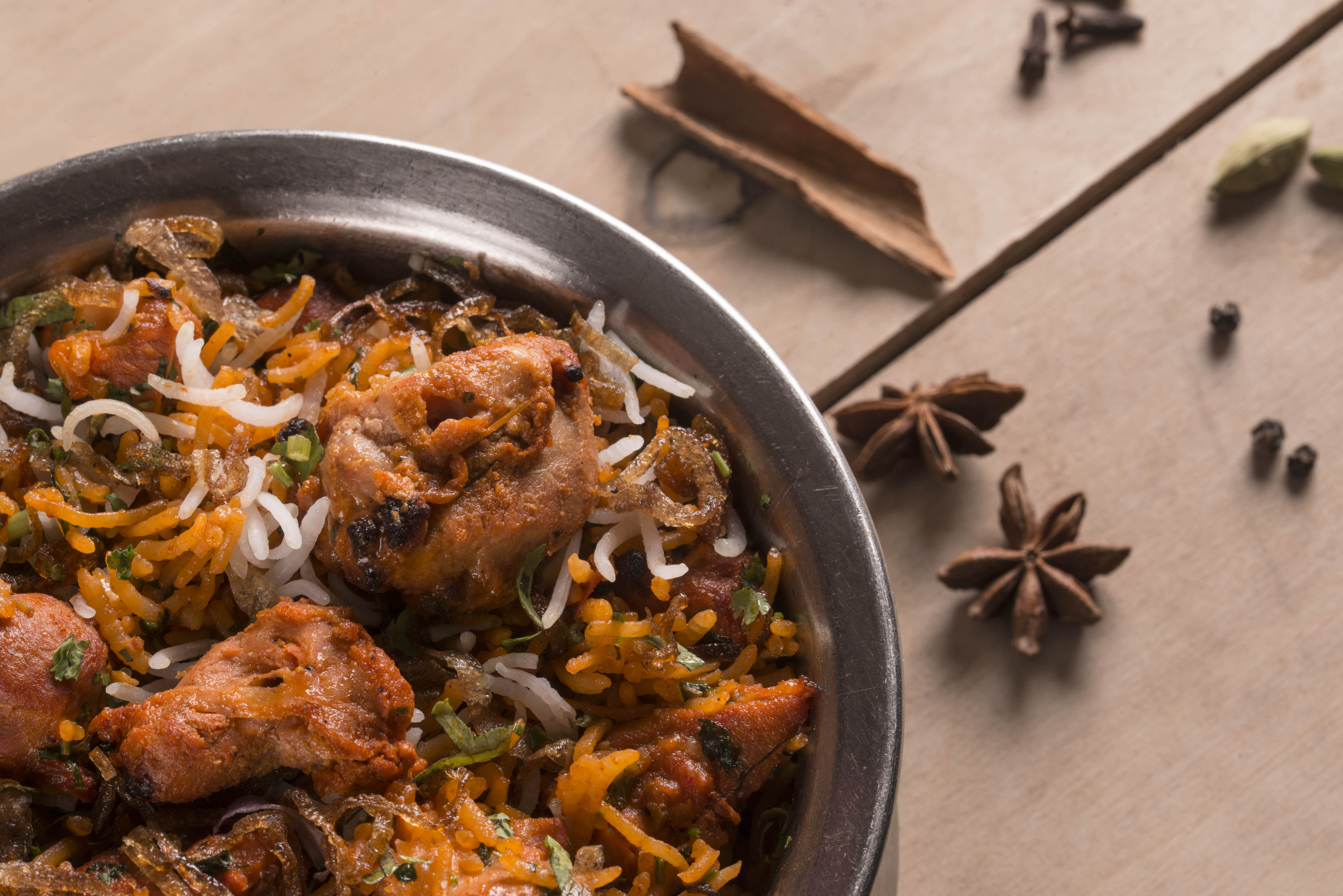
Nawabi chicken dum biryani

Biryani is widespread in Awadhi cuisine. When cooking it, pilau is first made by cooking basmati rice in ghee with warm, aromatic spices and then layered with meat curry or marinade (depending on the type of biryani), sealed, and cooked over low heat (dum cooking) until done.

=== Breads ===
As wheat is the staple food of the state, breads are significant. Breads are generally flatbreads baked in a pan; only a few varieties are raised breads. Improvisations of the roti (or bread) are of different types and made in various ways and include the rumaali roti, tandoori roti, naan (baked in a tandoor), kulcha, lachha paratha, sheermaal and bakarkhani. Breads made of other grains have descriptive names only, such as makai ki roti, jowar ki roti (barley flour roti), bajre ki roti (pearl millet roti), and chawal ki roti (roti of rice flour).

- Chapati is eaten for breakfast, lunch, or dinner.
- Puri are small and deep-fried so they puff up.
- Paratha is a common roti variant that is flaky, layered and lightly fried. It is frequently stuffed with vegetables, pulses, cottage cheese, or mincemeat.
- Rumali roti is a thin bread baked on a convex metal pan. The Hindi word rumaali means 'handkerchief'.
- Tandoori roti is thicker bread baked in a tandoor, and can be crispy or chewy depending on its thickness.
- Naan is a pan-baked soft thick bread.
- Sheermaal is a sweet baked yeast naan made with flour, milk, sugar, and saffron.
- Baqarkhani is a variation of sheermaal cooked on a griddle rather than baked.
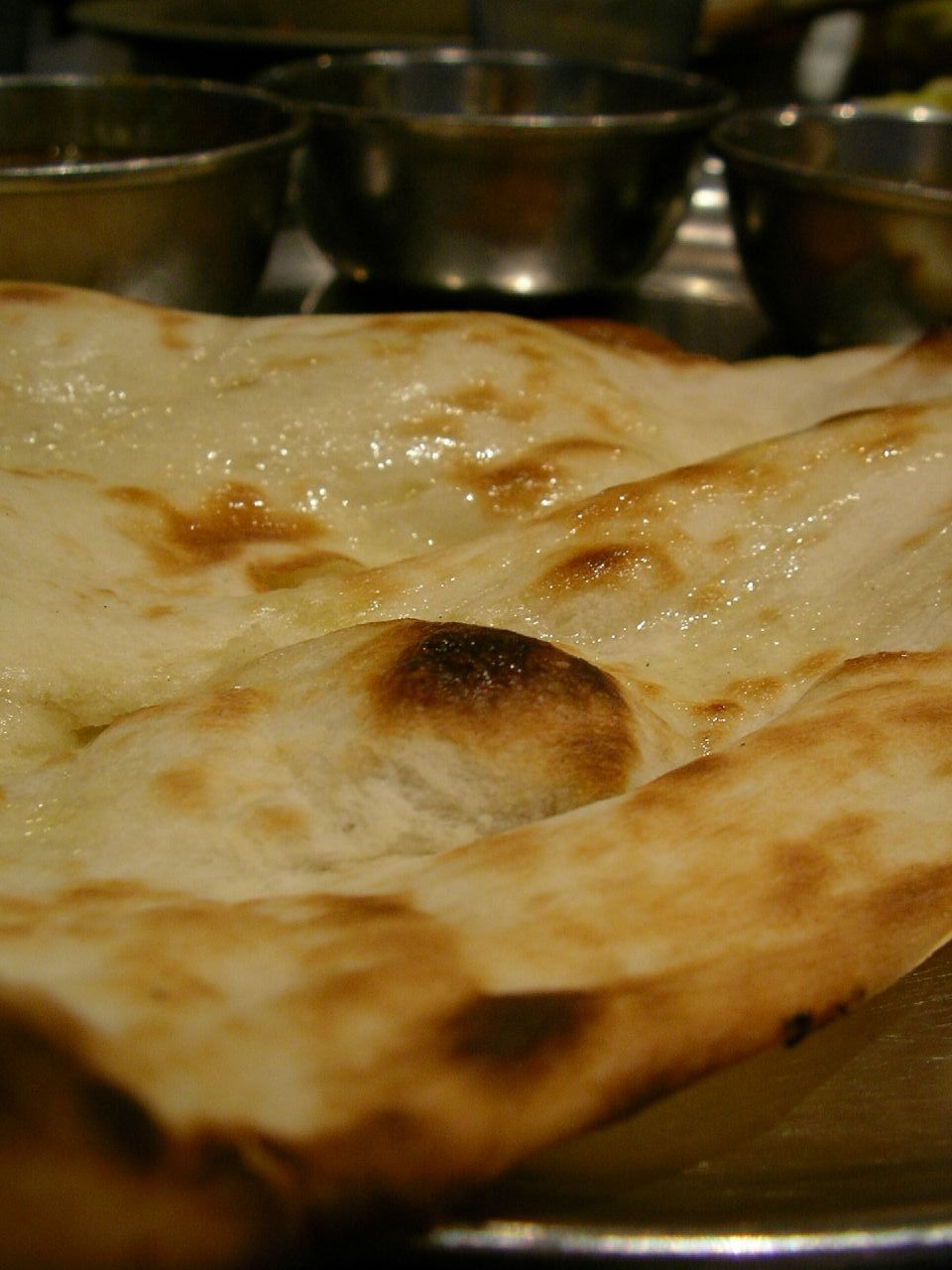
Indian naan

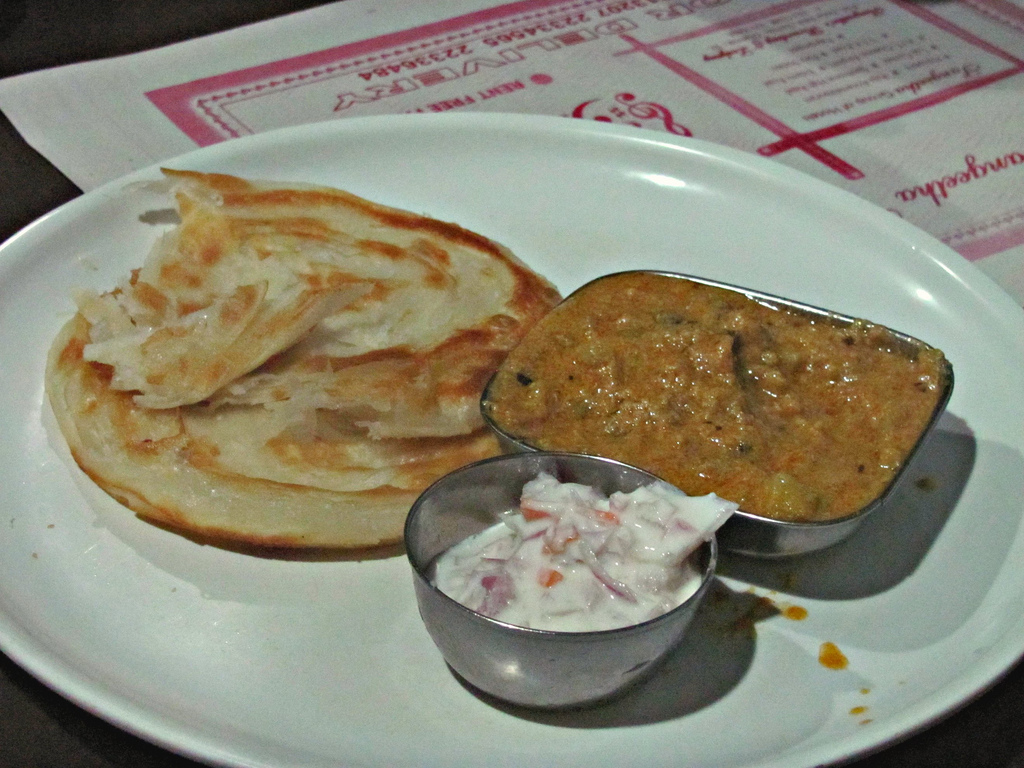
Sabji with paratha

=== Desserts ===
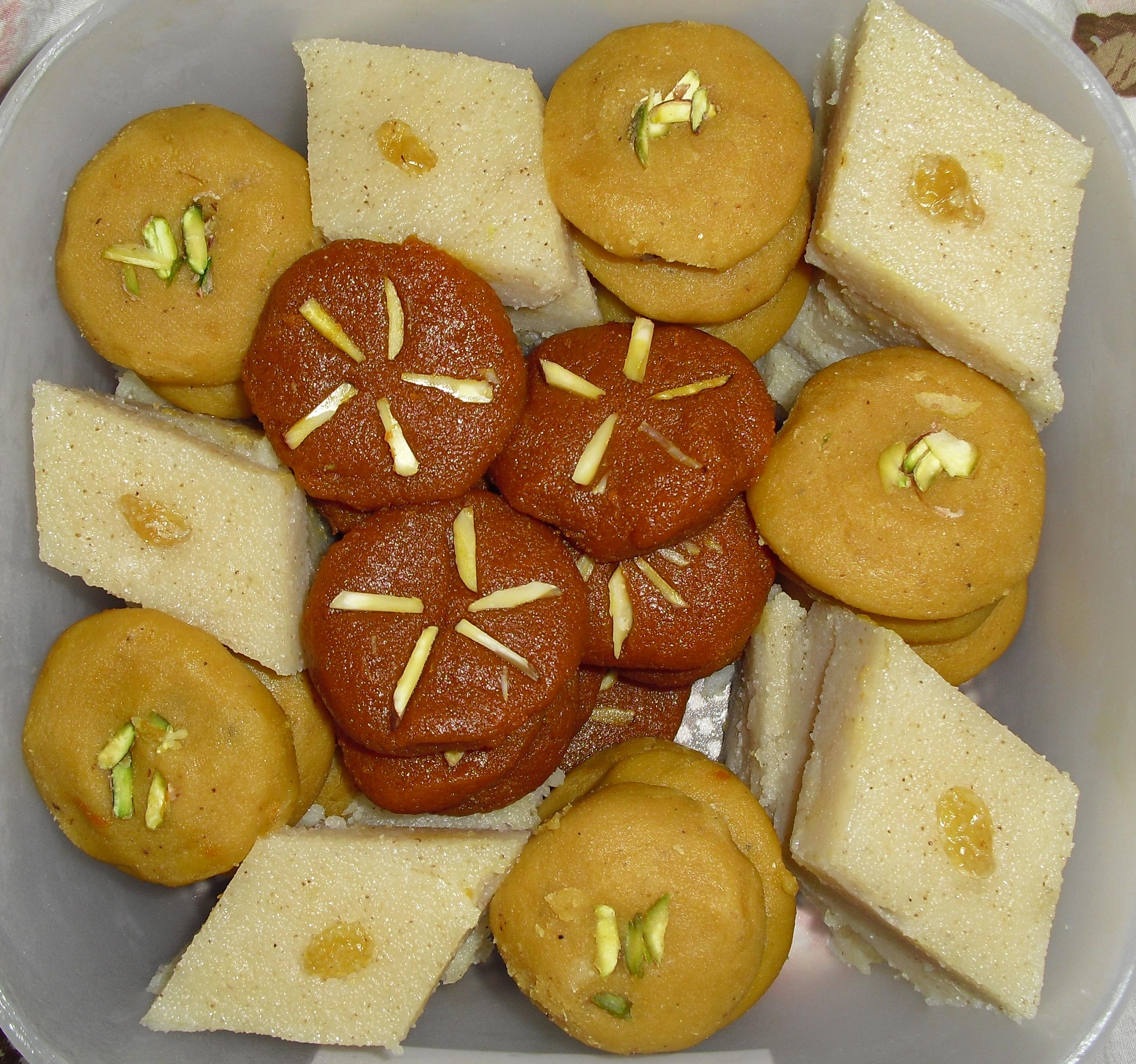
Halvas including sooji, chana, and gajar halva

Halwas of all kinds are a common dessert within the cuisine, particularly in winter. There are several varieties of these, prepared from different cereals, such as gram flour, sooji, wheat, nuts, and eggs. The special halwa or halwa sohan, has four varieties: Papadi, Jauzi, Habshi, and Dudhiya.

=== Chaats ===
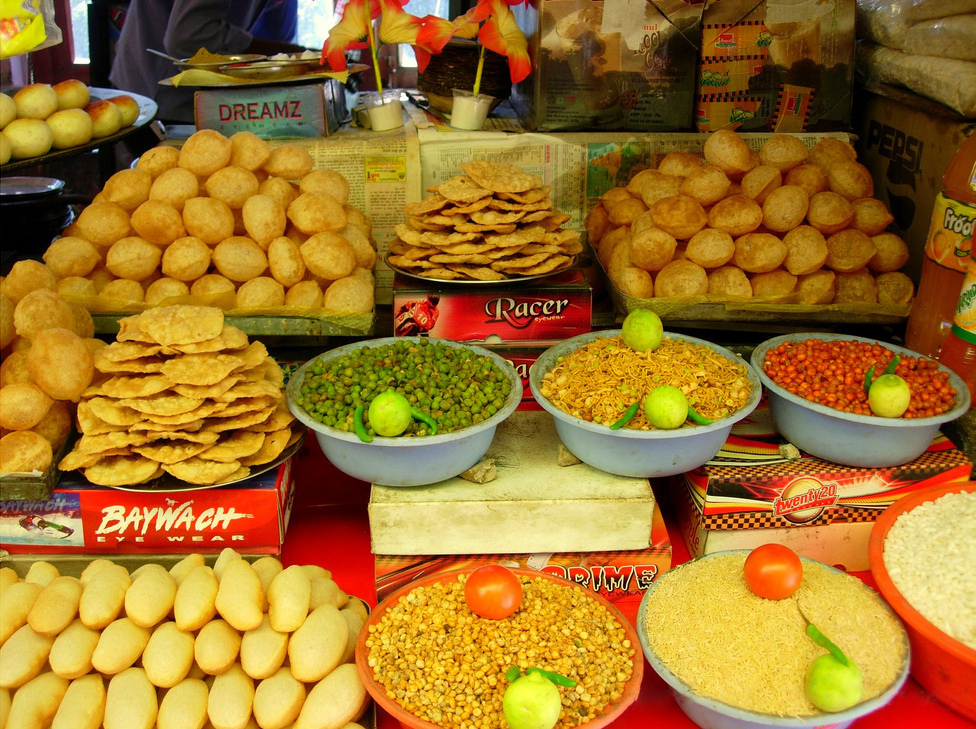
A chaat corner

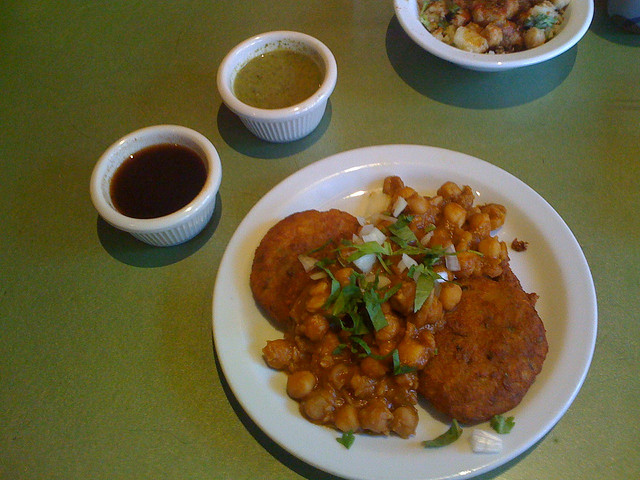
A chaat dish

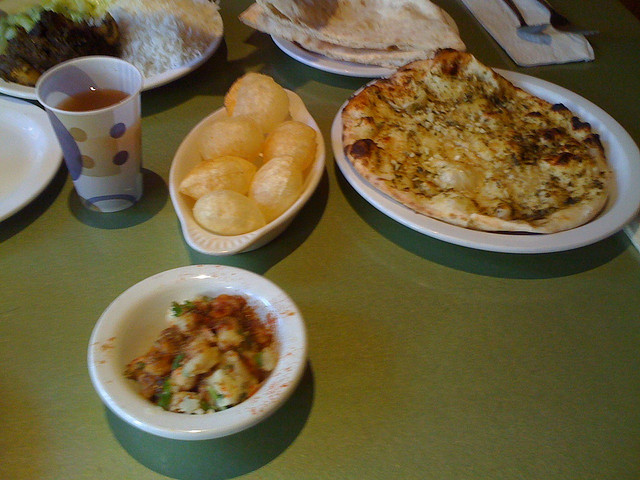
Paani kay batashey

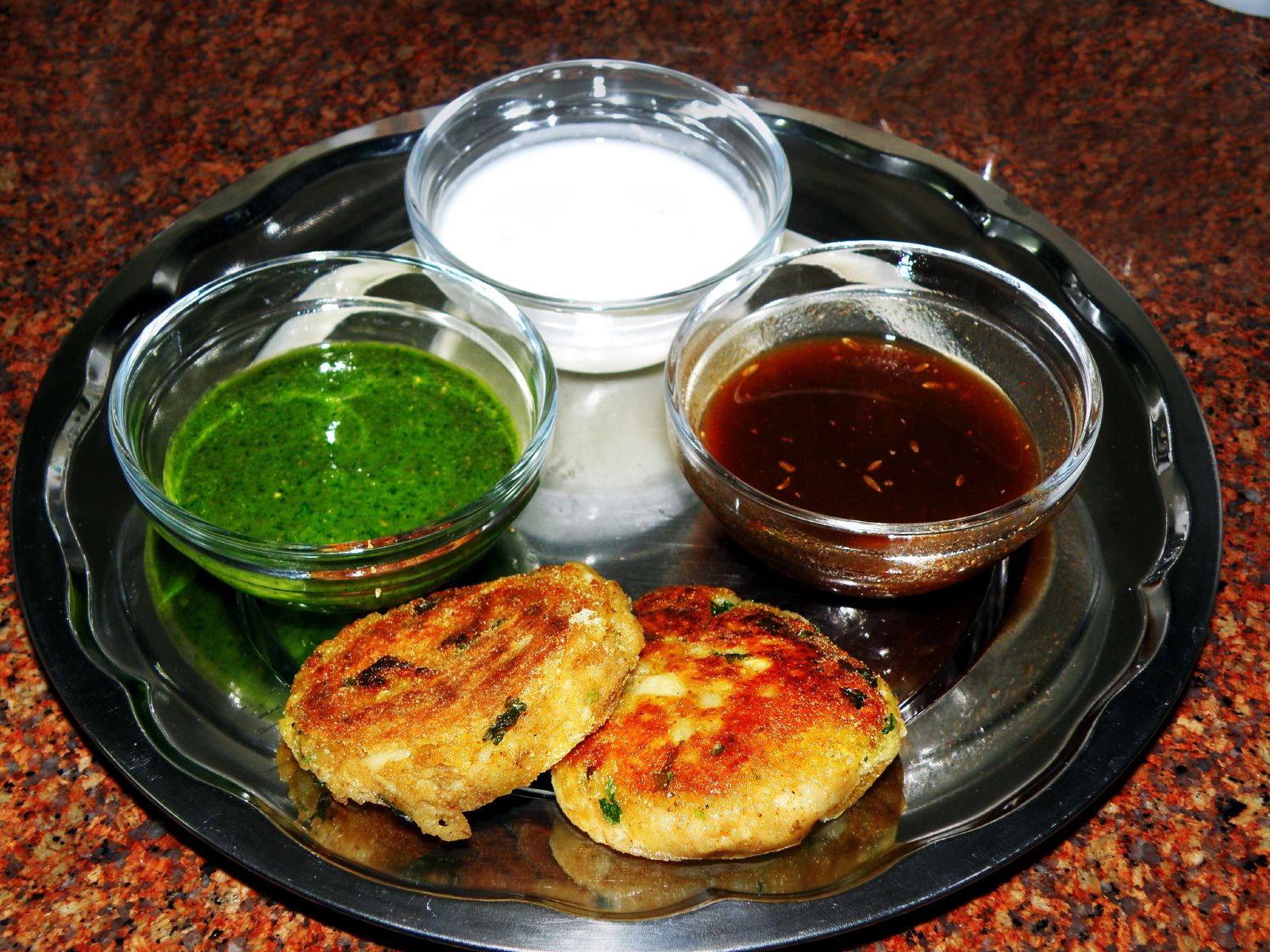
Aloo tikki served with chutneys

Chaat originated in Uttar Pradesh but are now popular across South Asia as a staple of street food. The chaat variants are based on fried dough, with added ingredients. The original chaat is a mixture of potato, chickpeas, spices, chilli, saunth (dried ginger and tamarind sauce), coriander leaves, and yogurt, but other popular variants include aloo tikkis (garnished with onion, coriander, hot spices and a dash of curd), dahi puri, golgappa, dahi vada and papri chaat.

There are common elements among these variants including dahi, or yogurt; chopped onions and coriander; sev (small dried yellow salty noodles); and chaat masala, a spice mix typically consisting of amchoor (dried mango powder), cumin, kala namak (rock salt), coriander, dried ginger, salt, black pepper, and red pepper. The ingredients are combined and served on a small metal plate or a banana leaf, dried and formed into a bowl.

Traditional vegetarian Awadhi dishes

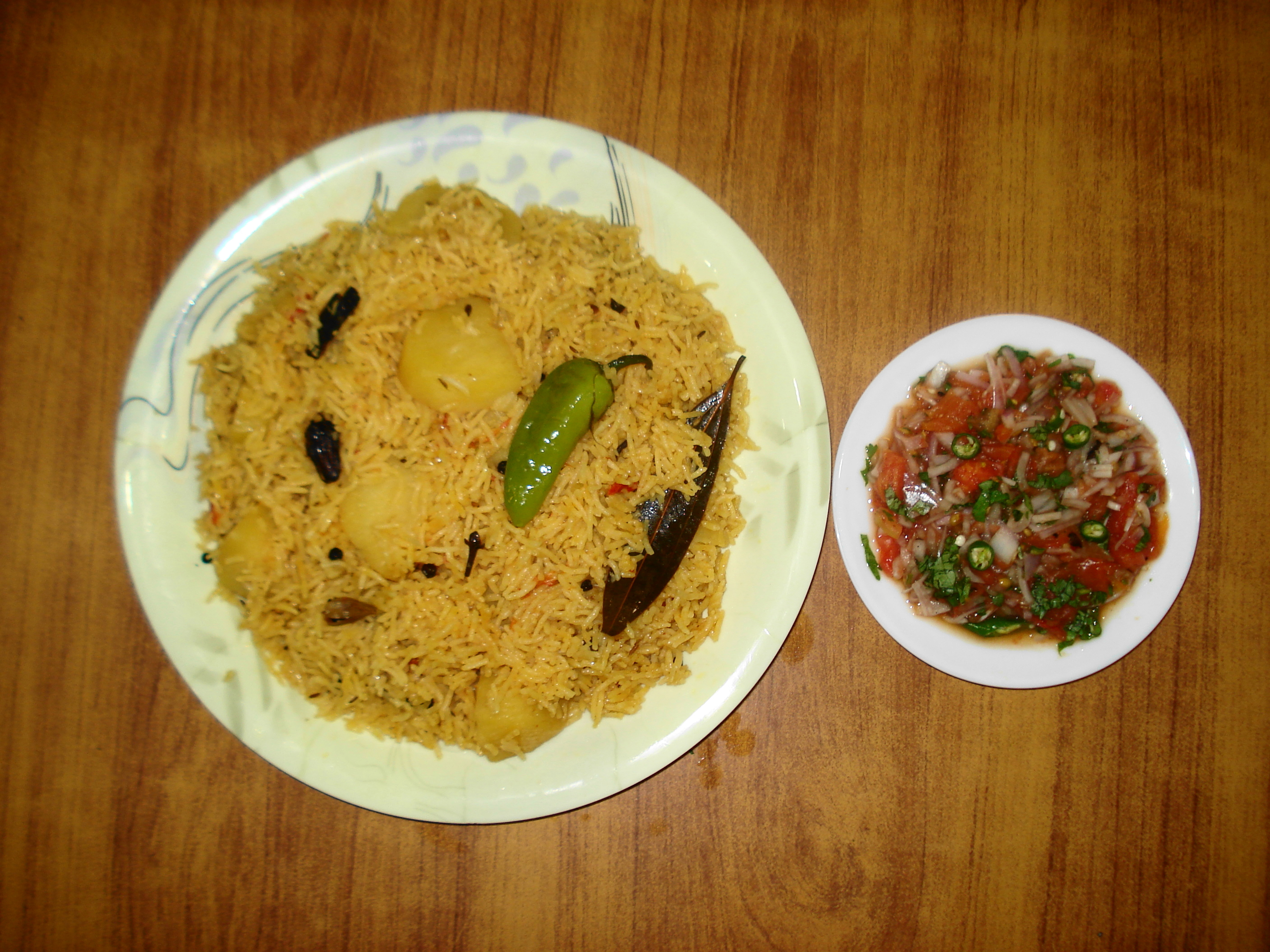
Tehri

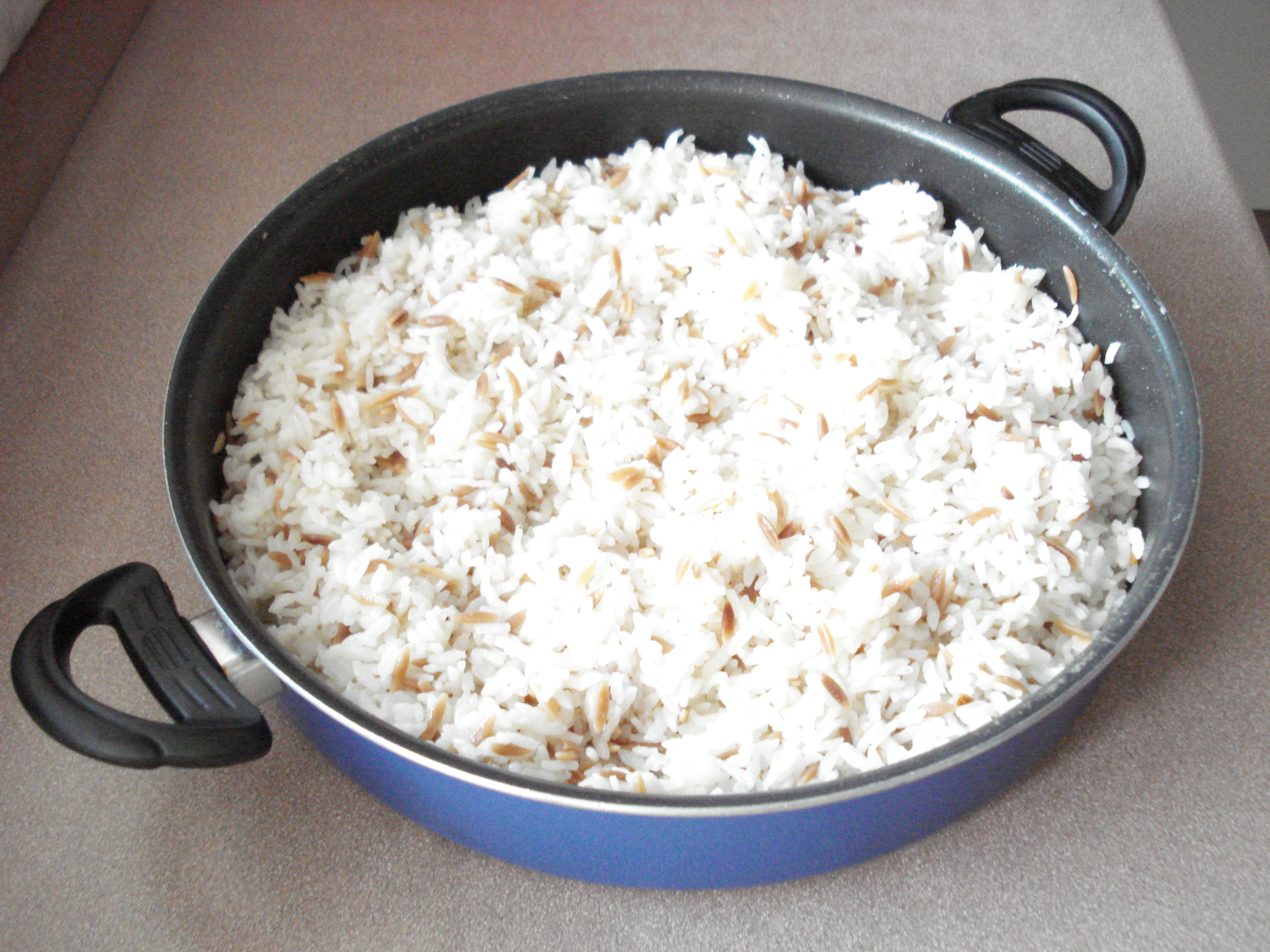
Pilao

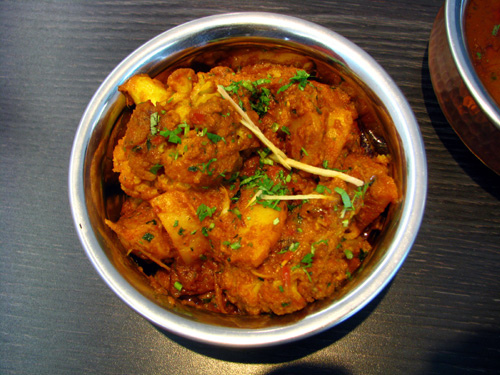
Alu gobhi

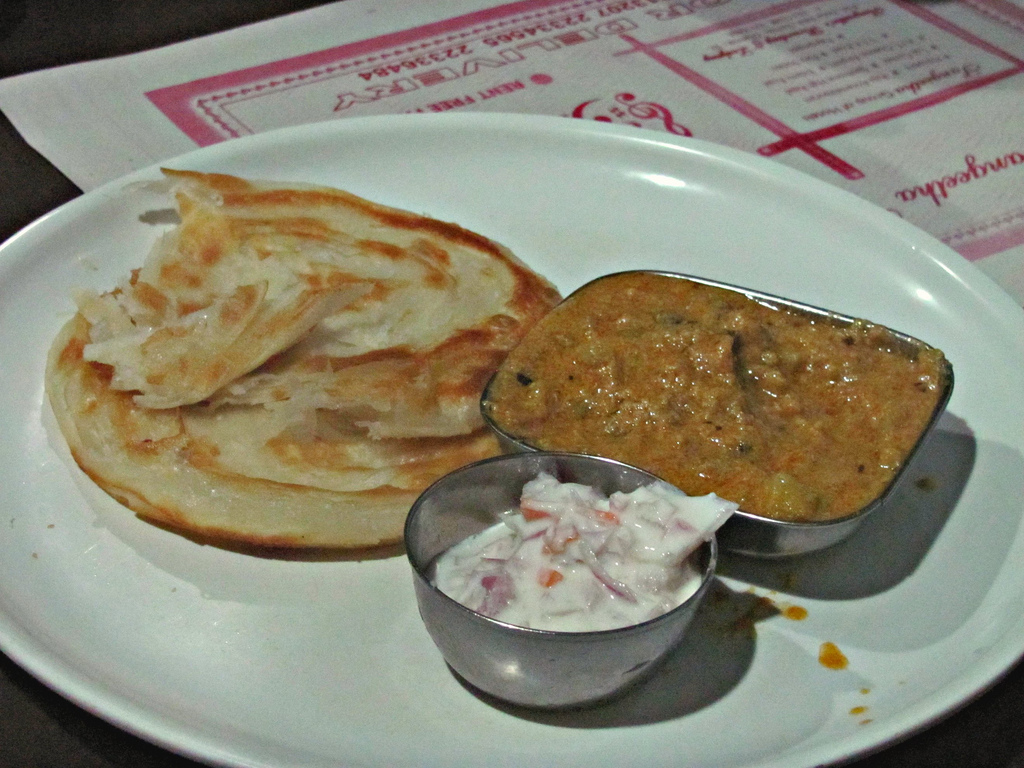
Breakfast

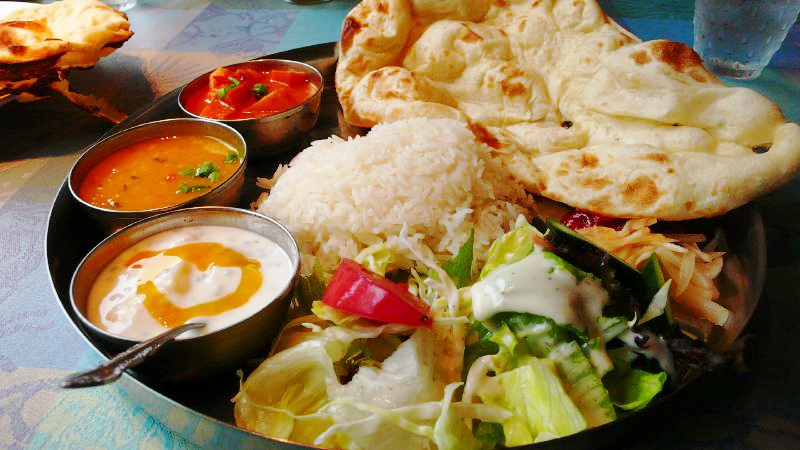
Uttar Pradeshi thali

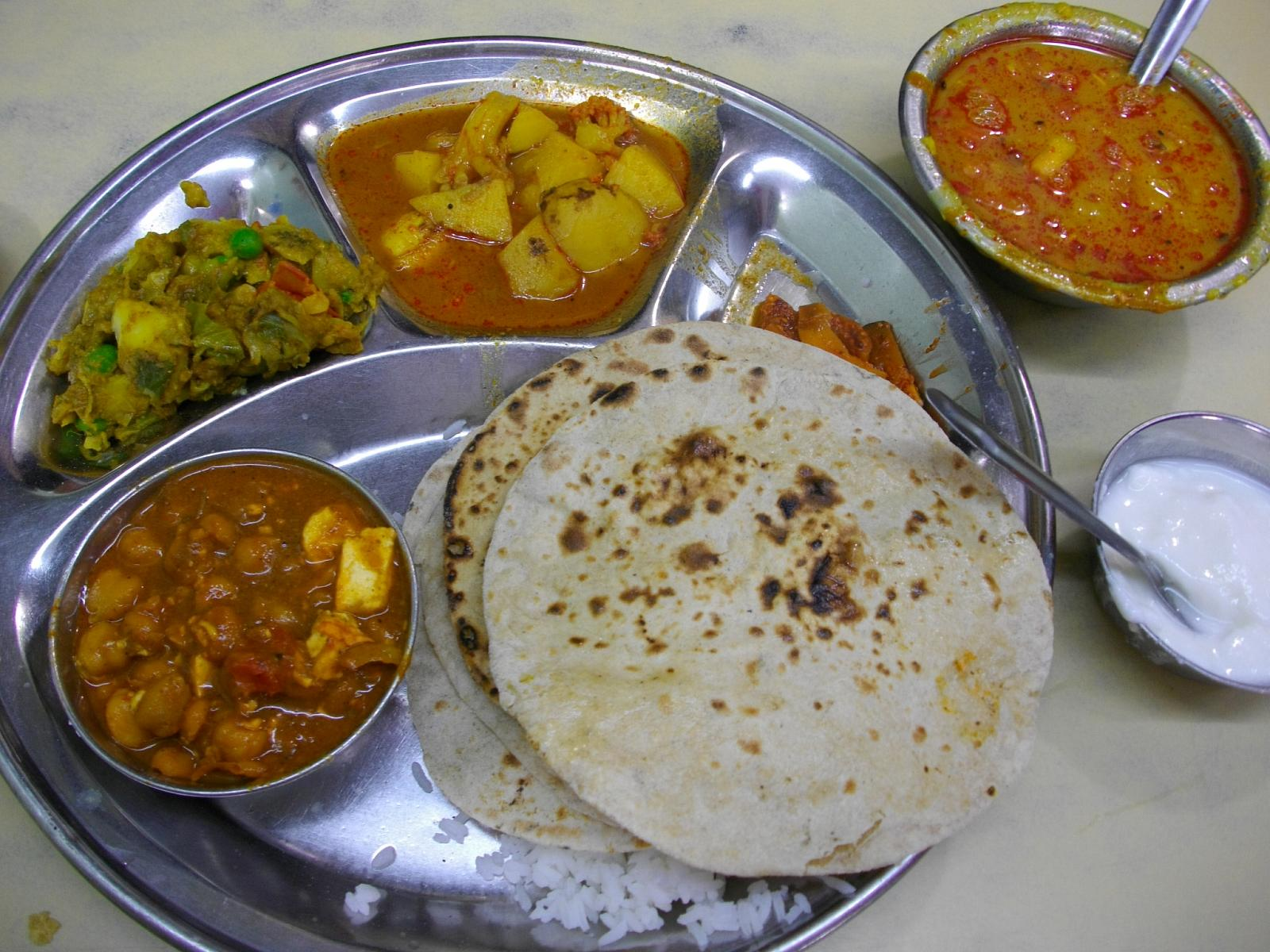
Vegetarian thali

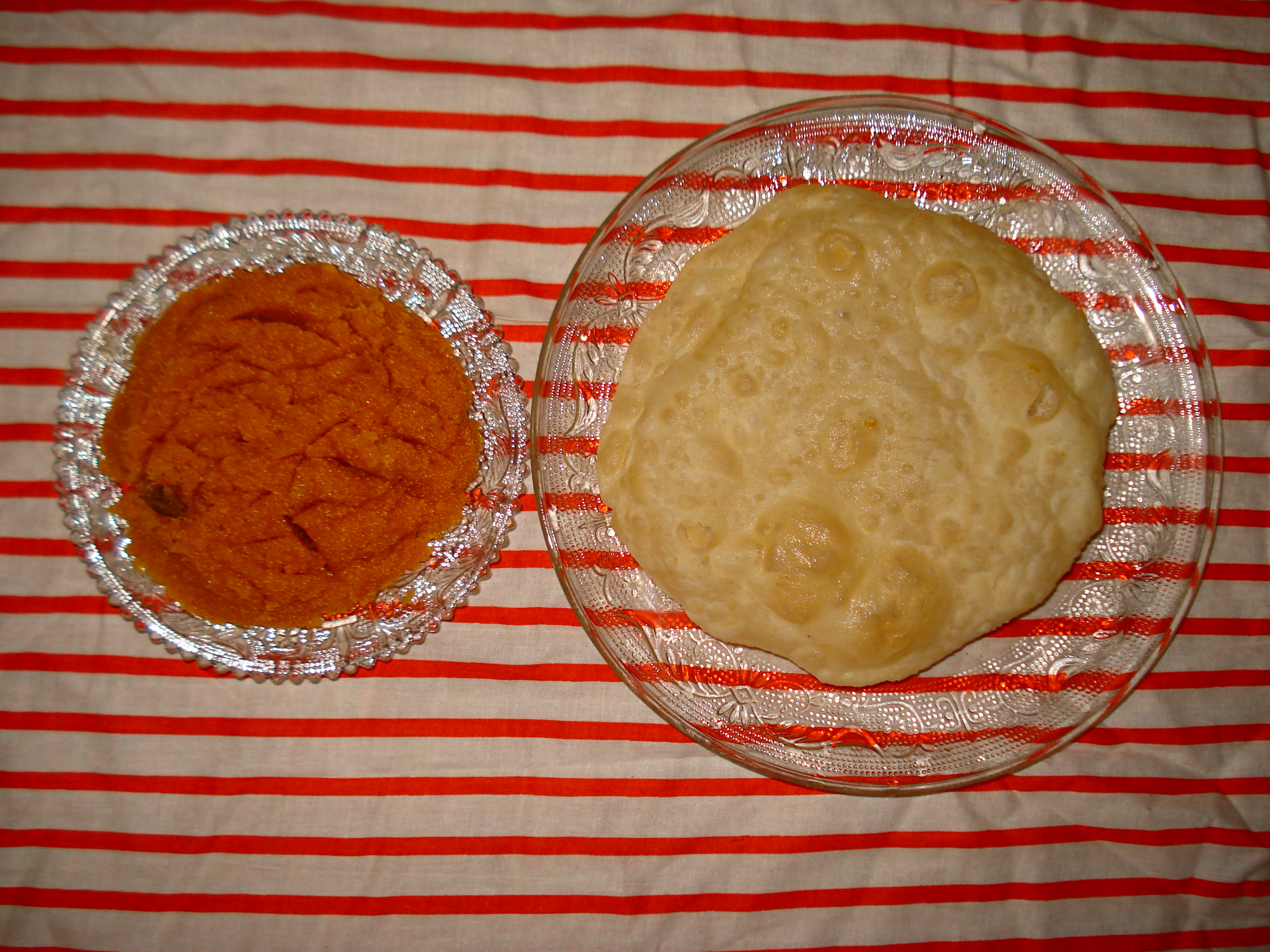
Halva poori

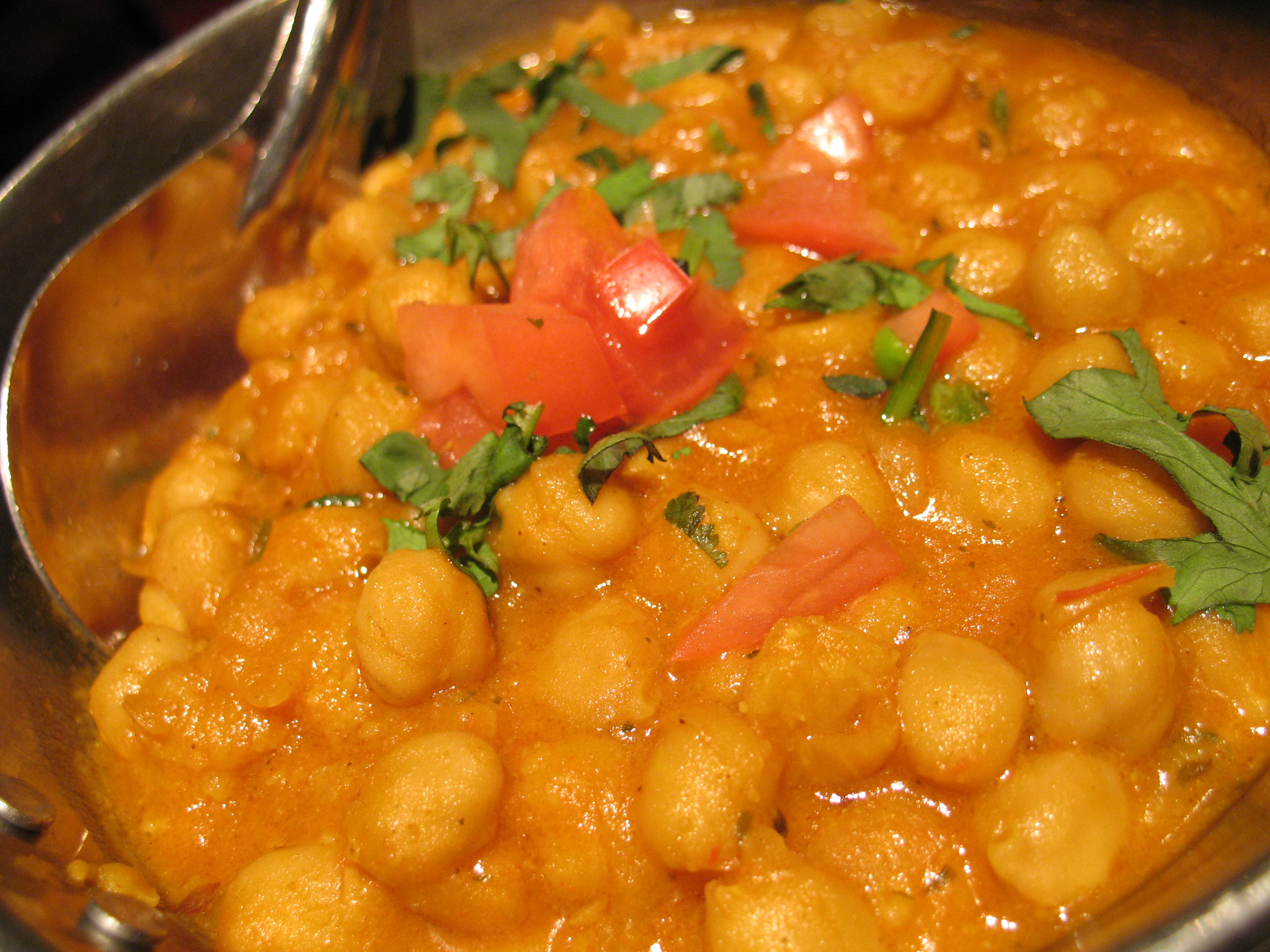
Chhola

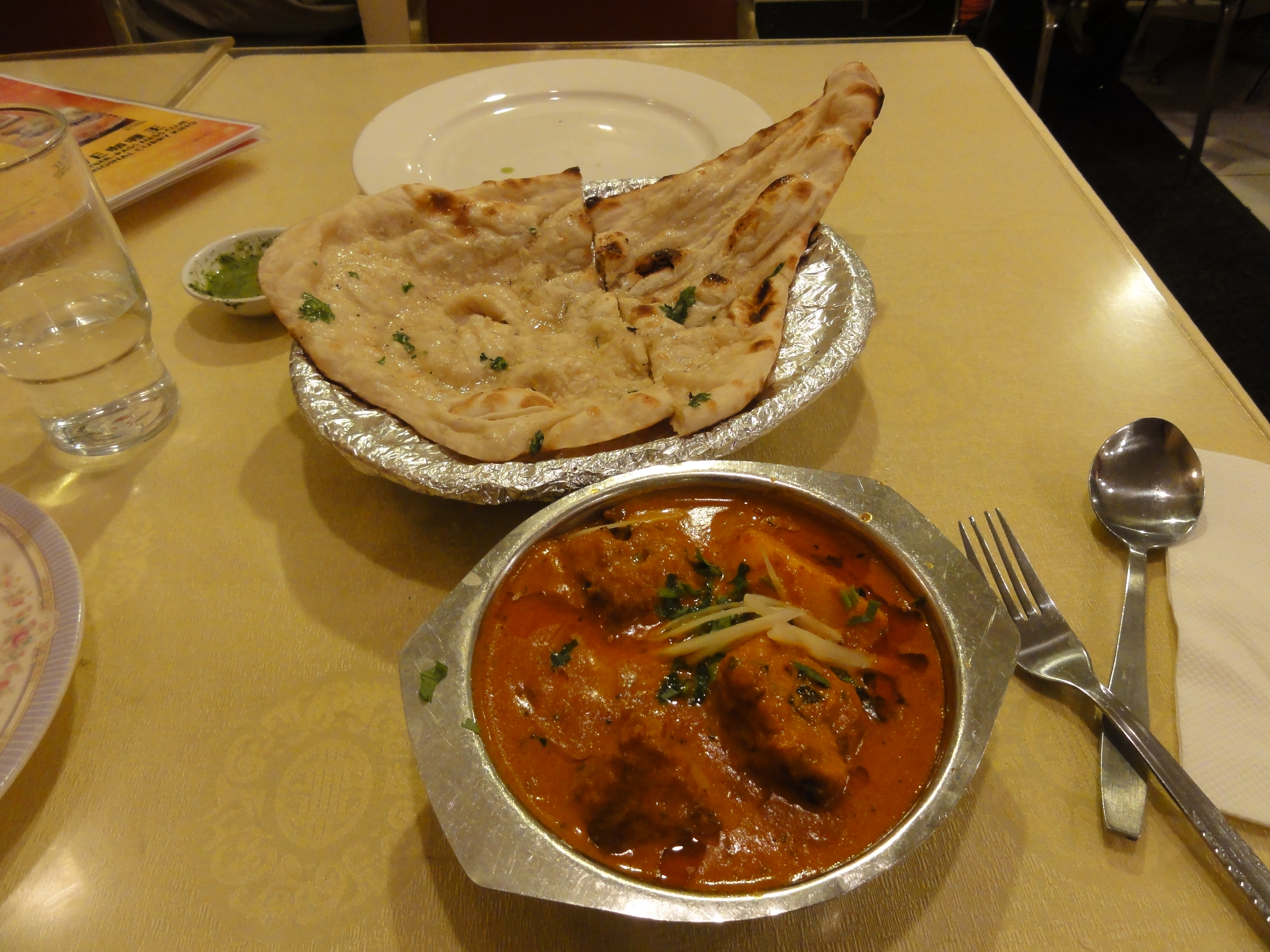
Naan with fish curry

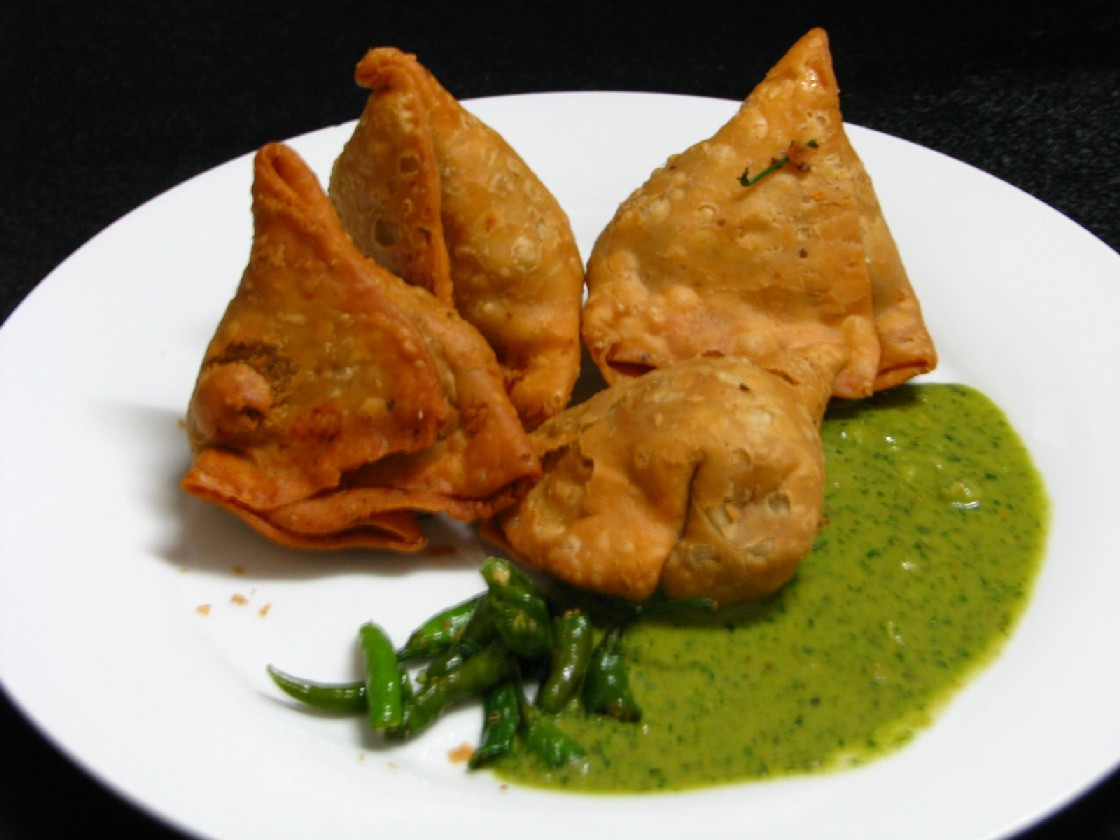
Samosa served with chutney

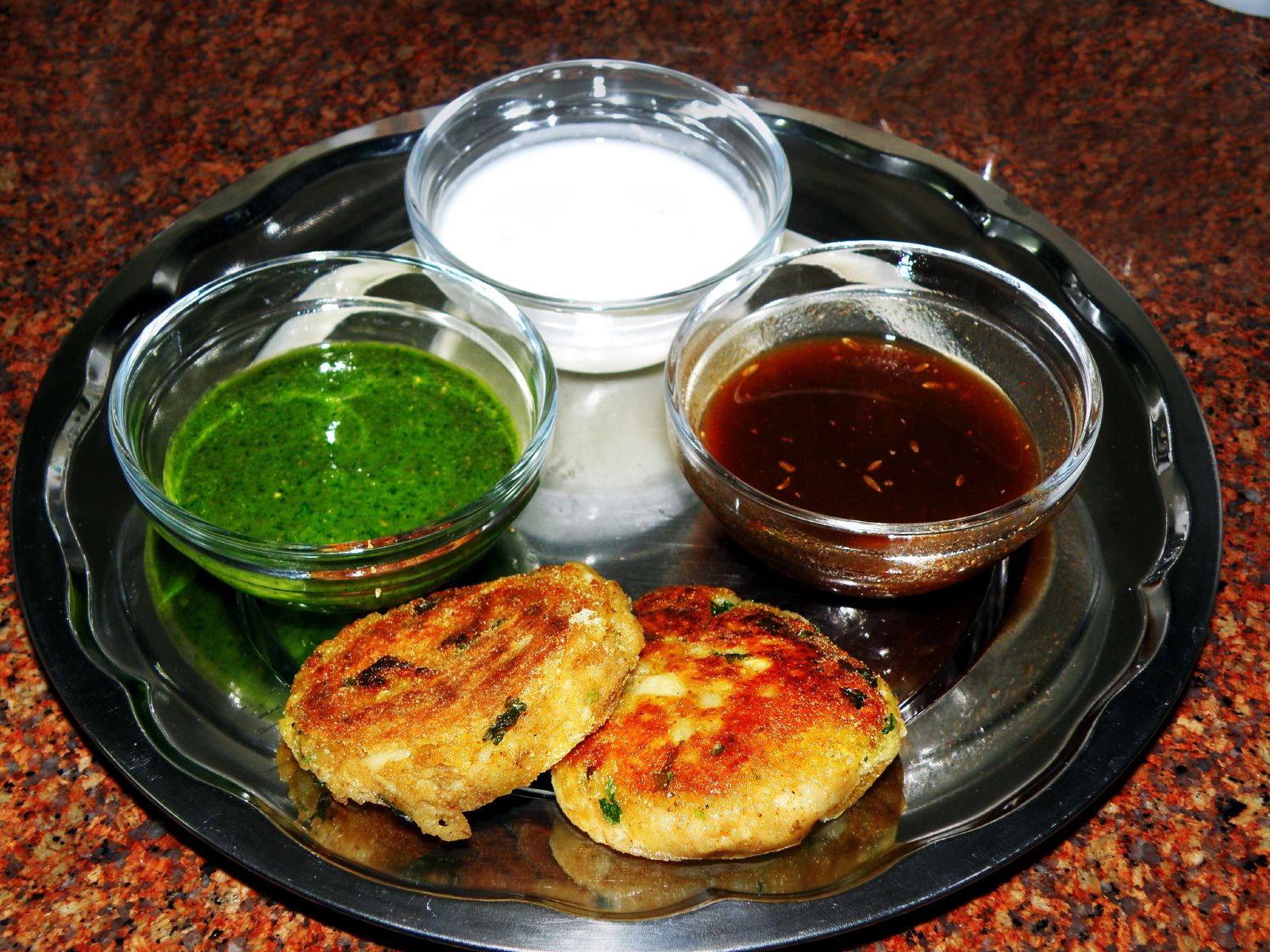
Aloo tikki, chutneys, and dahi

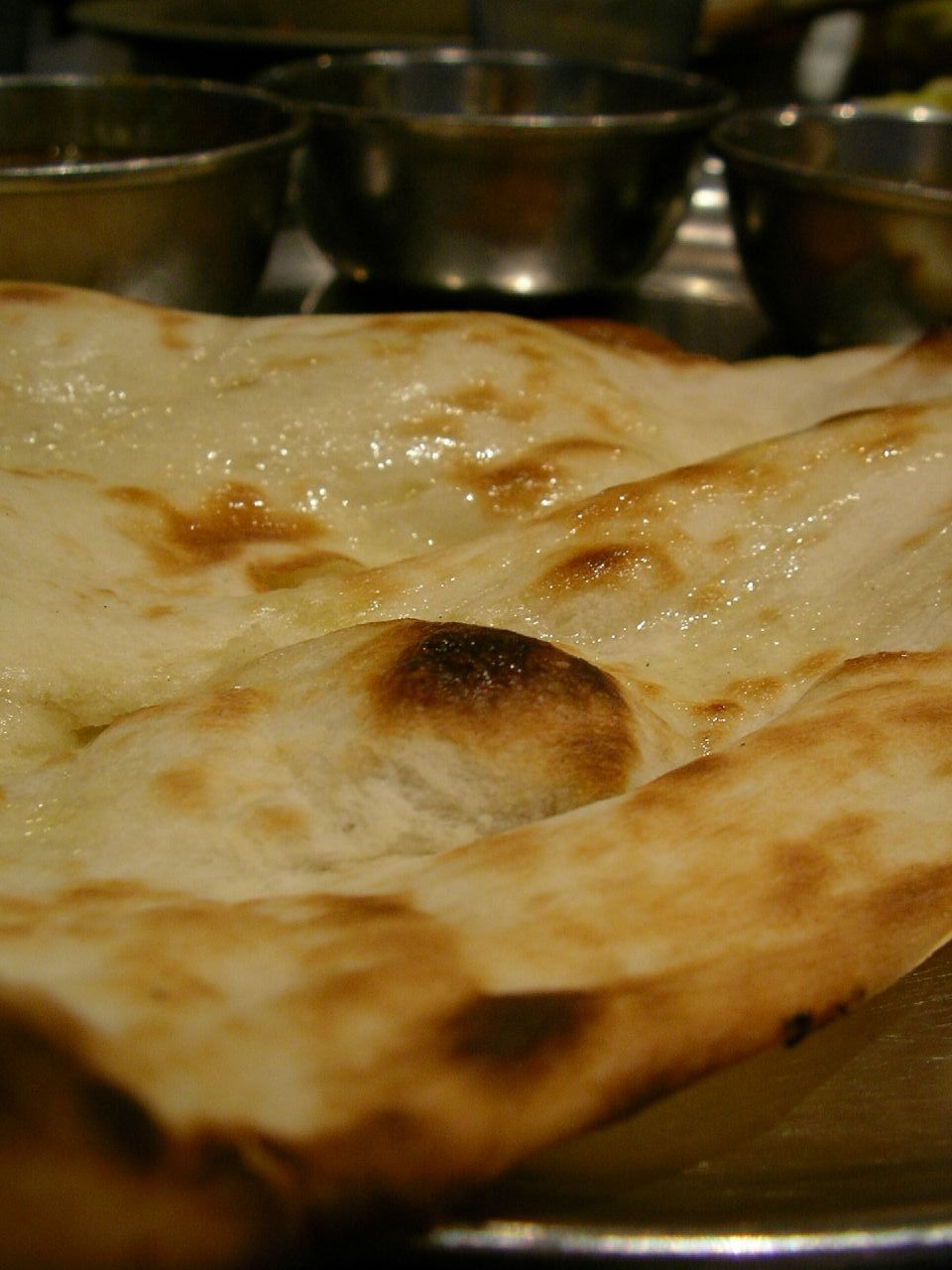
Naan a staple bread of Awadh

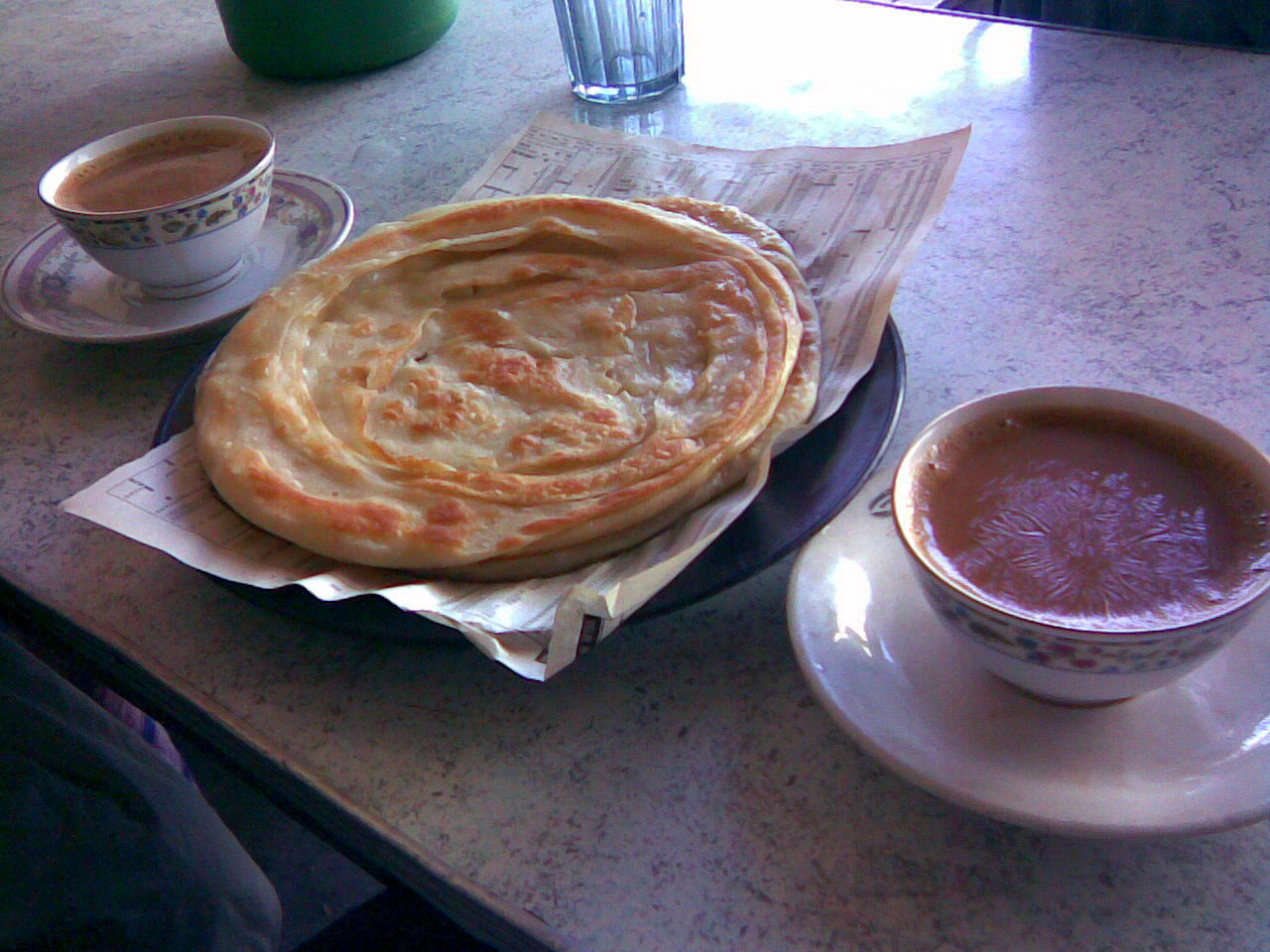
Paratha served with tea

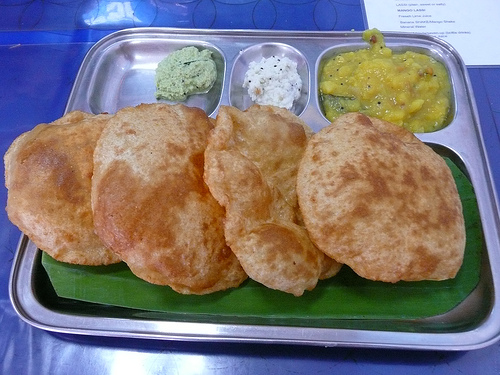
Puri with accompaniments

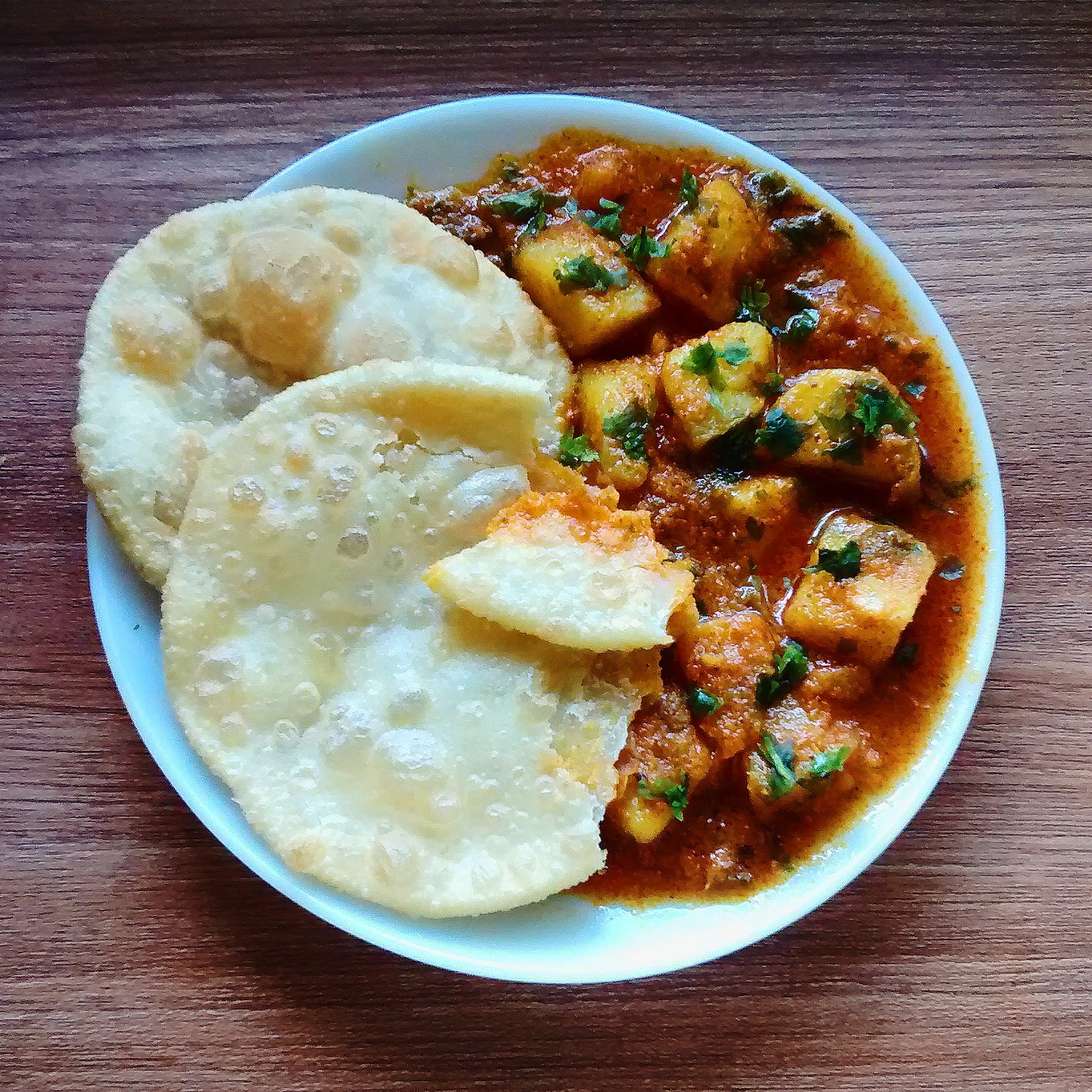
Puri Sabji

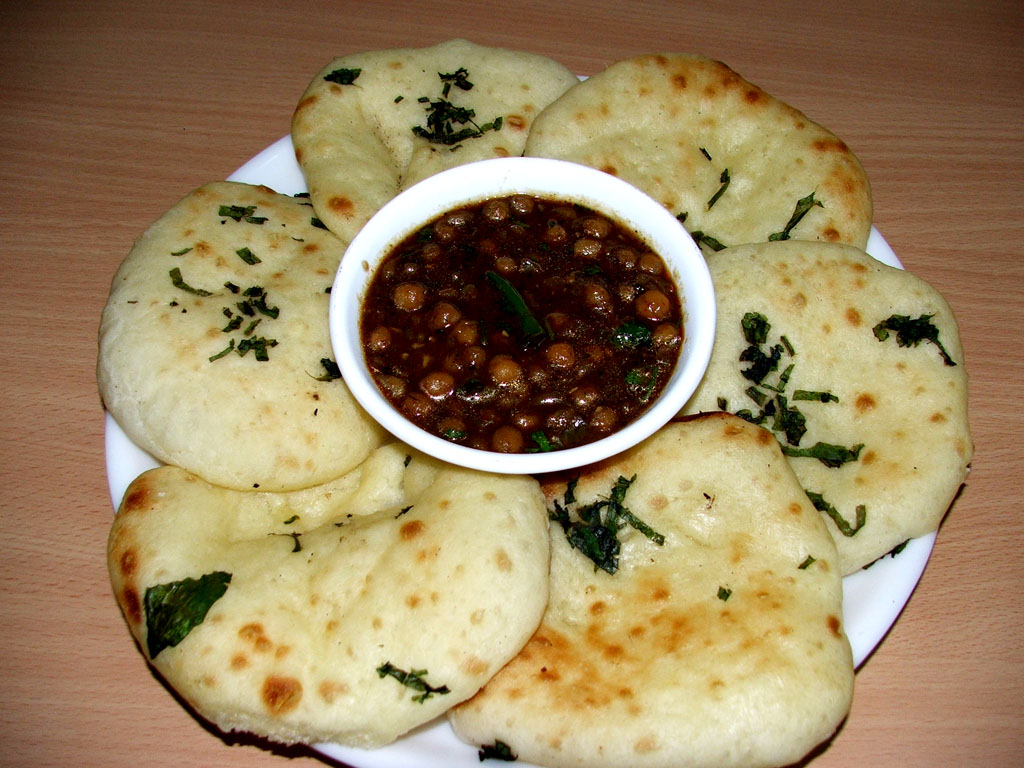
Kulcha with chhole

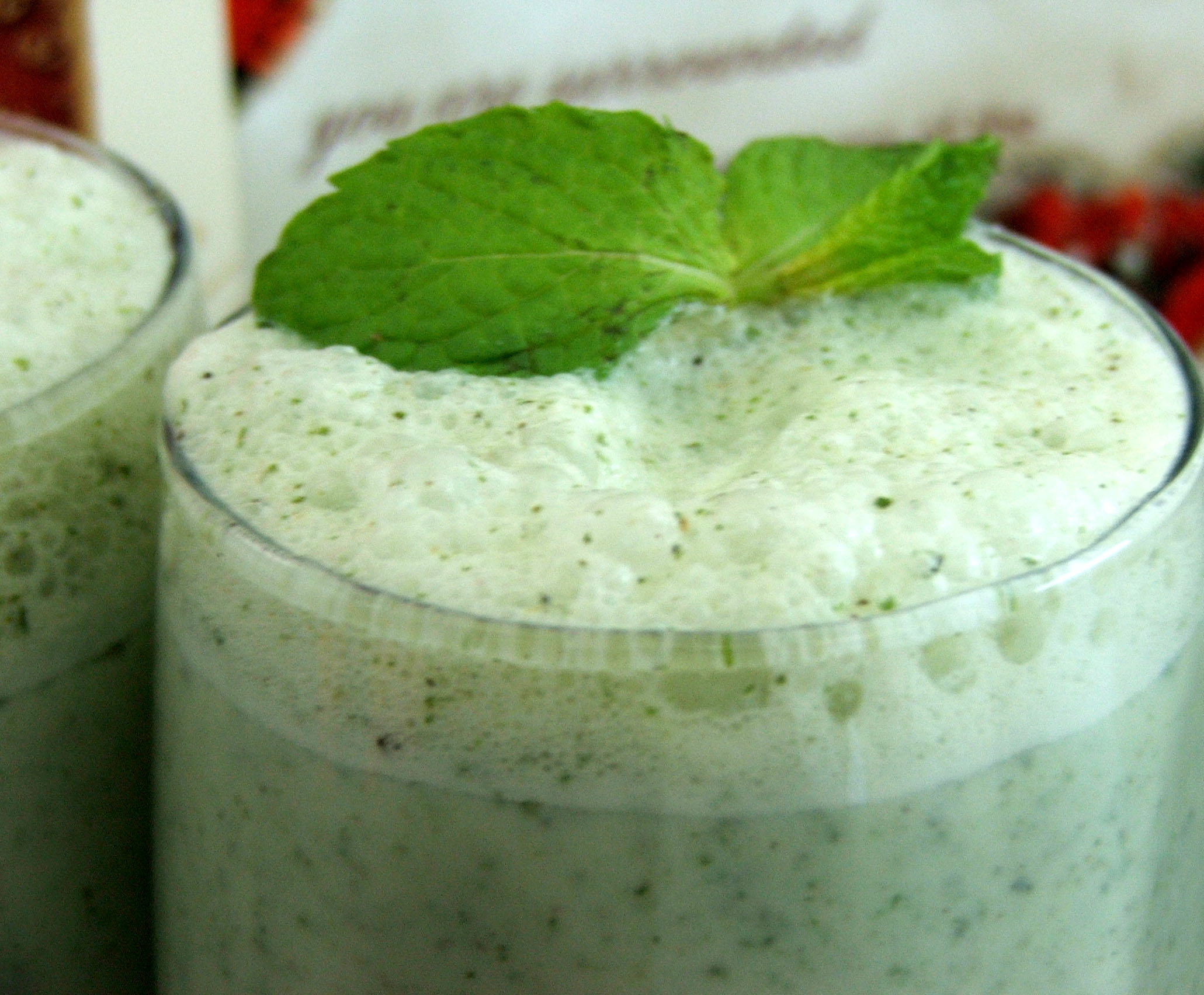
Mint salted lassi

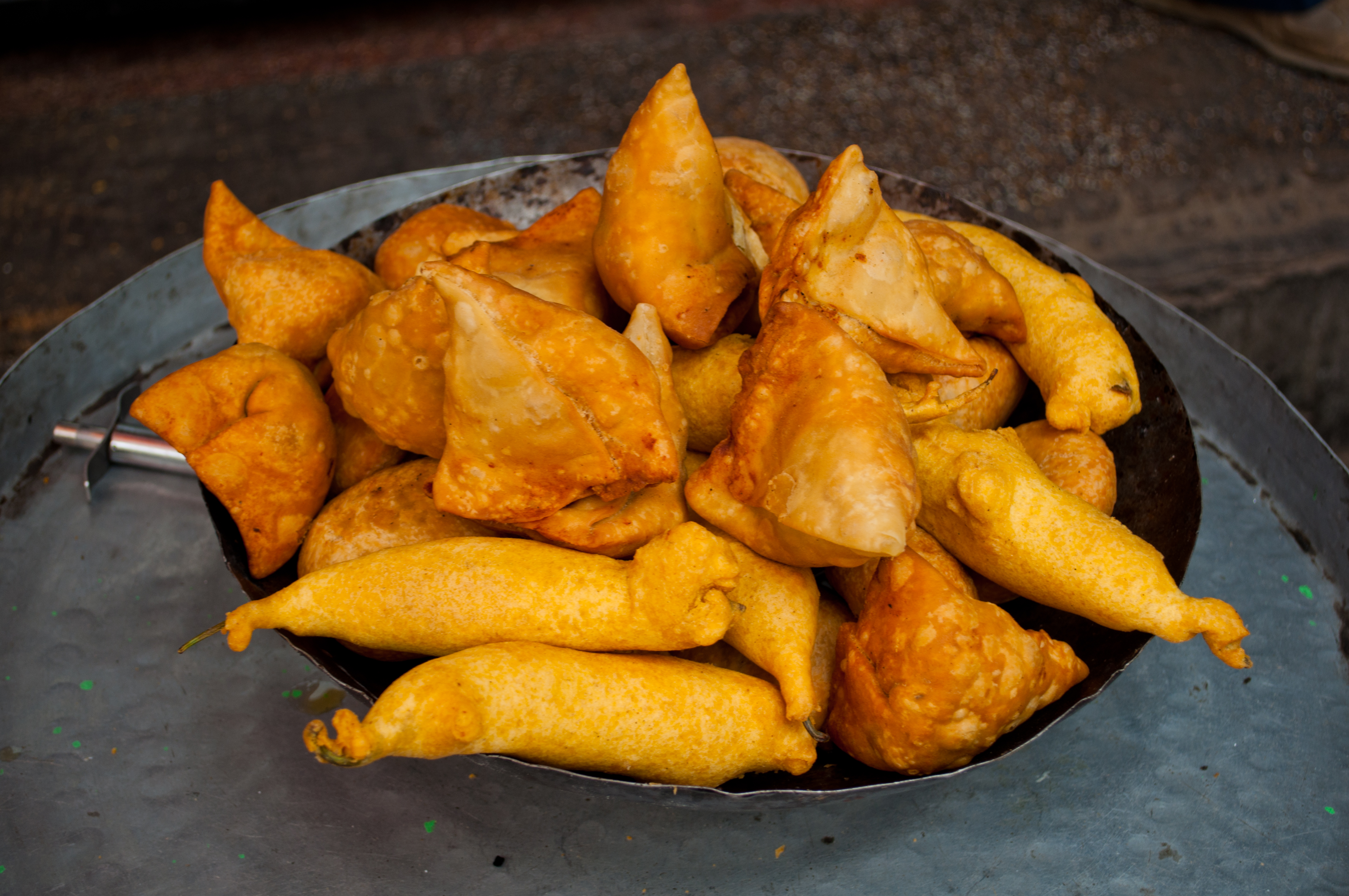
Awadhi samosa

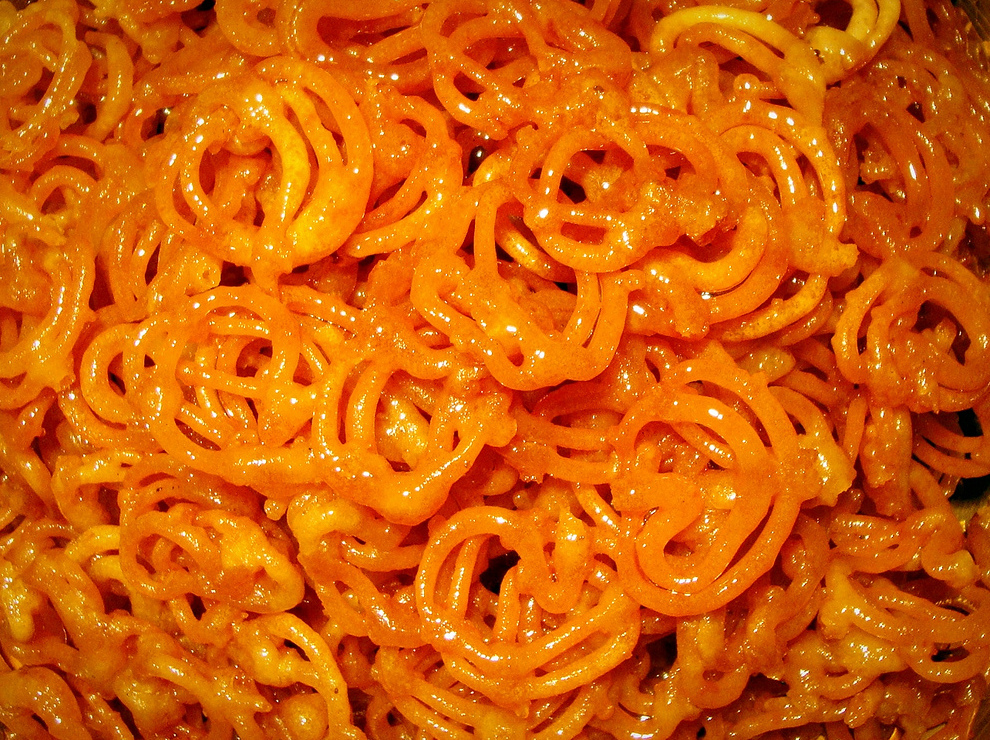
Awadhi jalebi

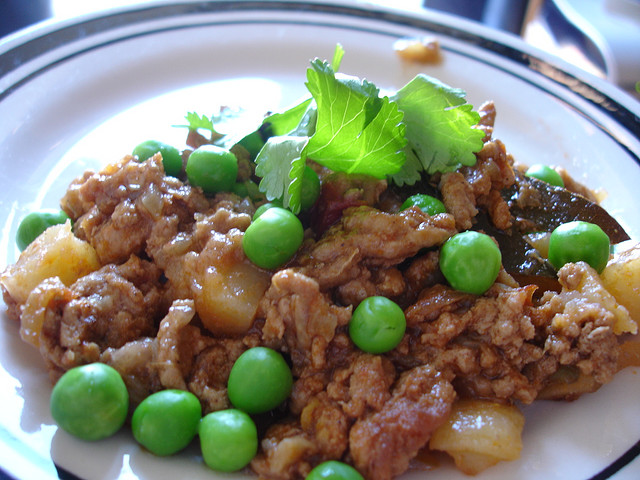
Awadhi kheema

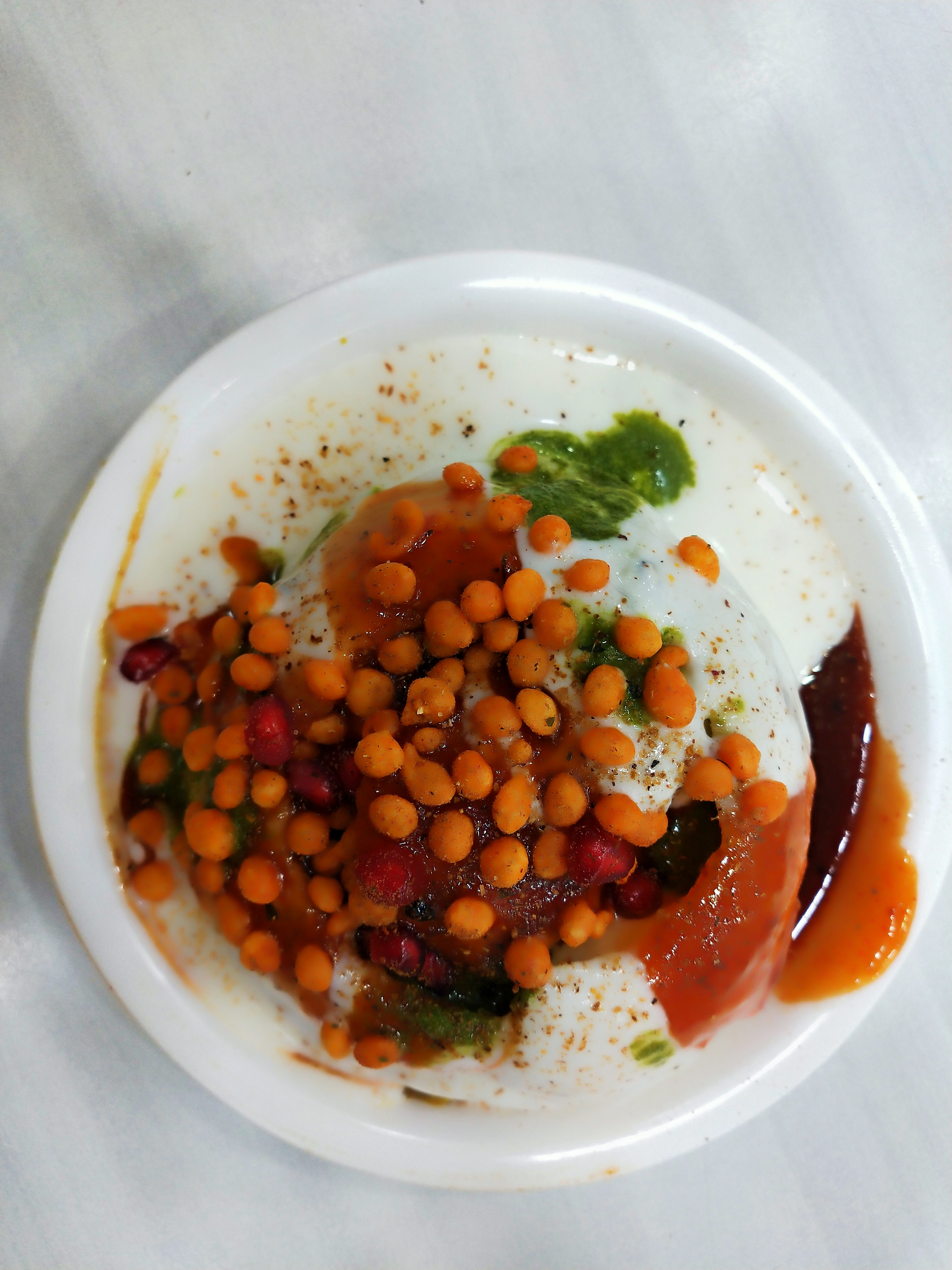
Bharwa Kachaudi

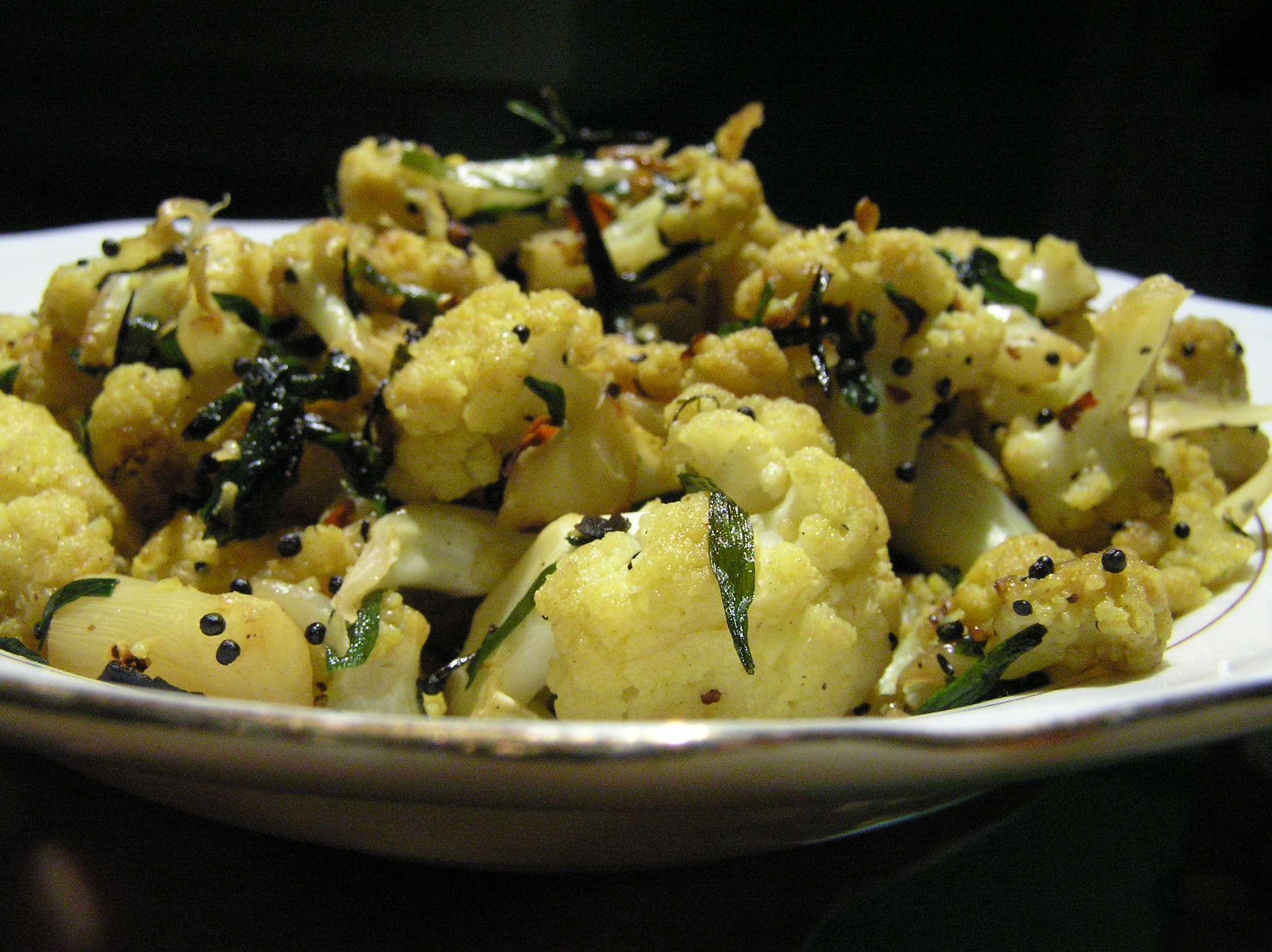
Awadhi gobhi

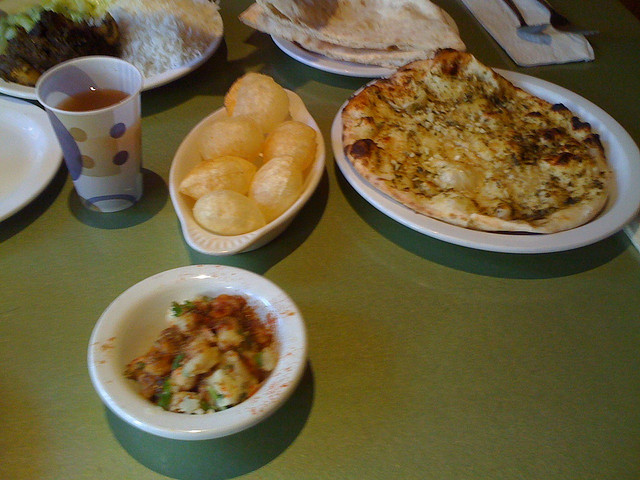
Awadhi chaat

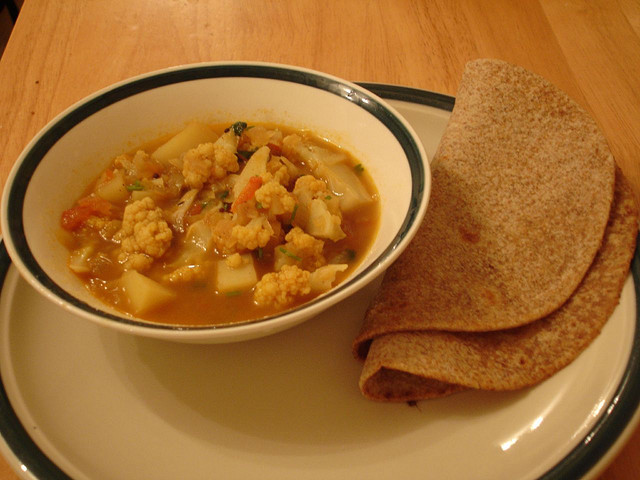
Awadhi gobhi roti

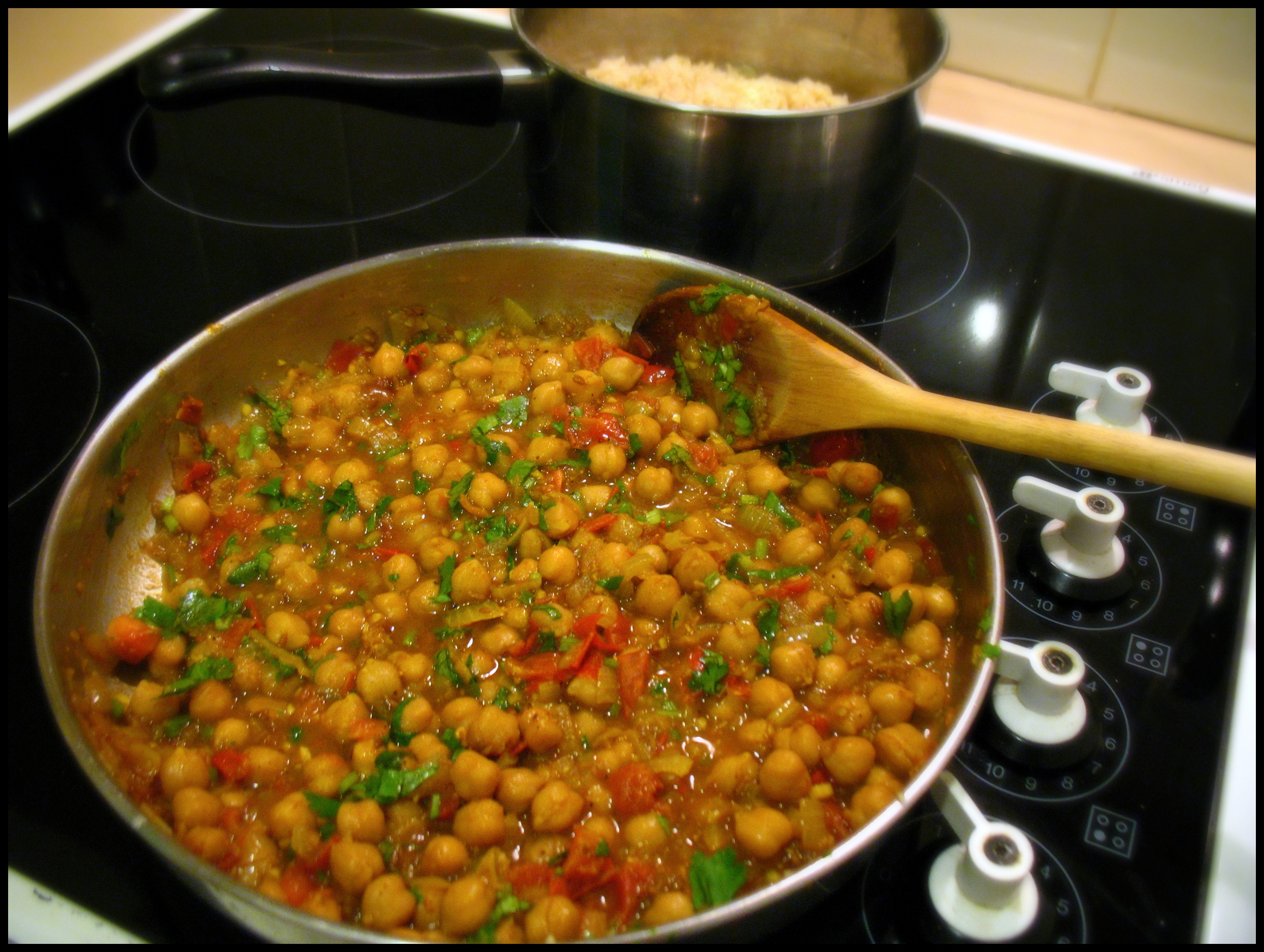
Awadhi chana

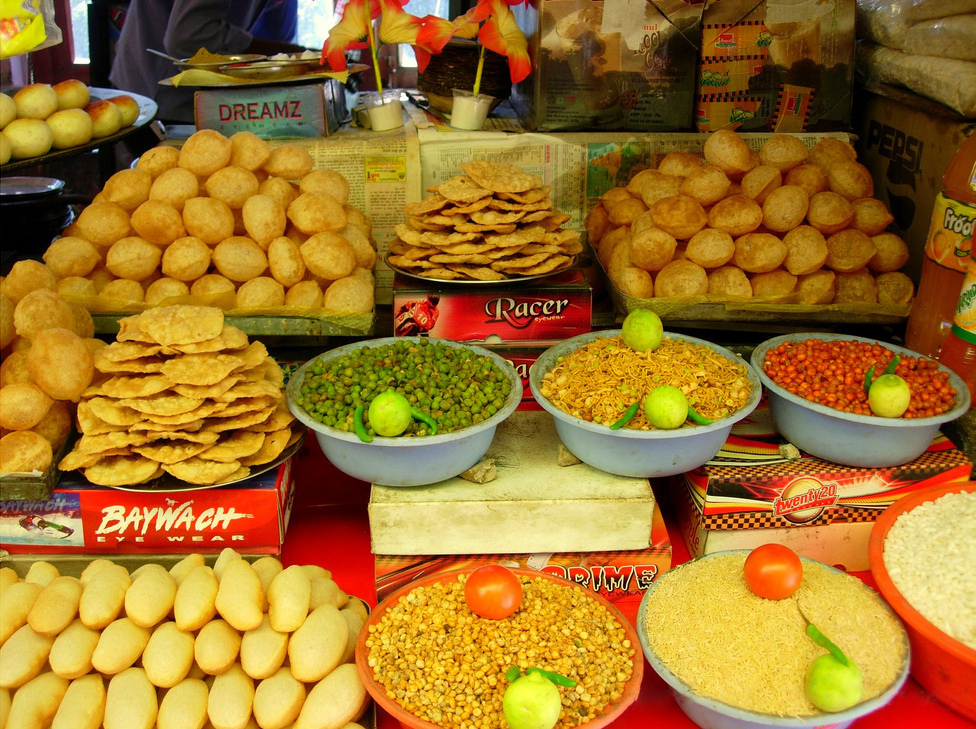
Awadhi chaat

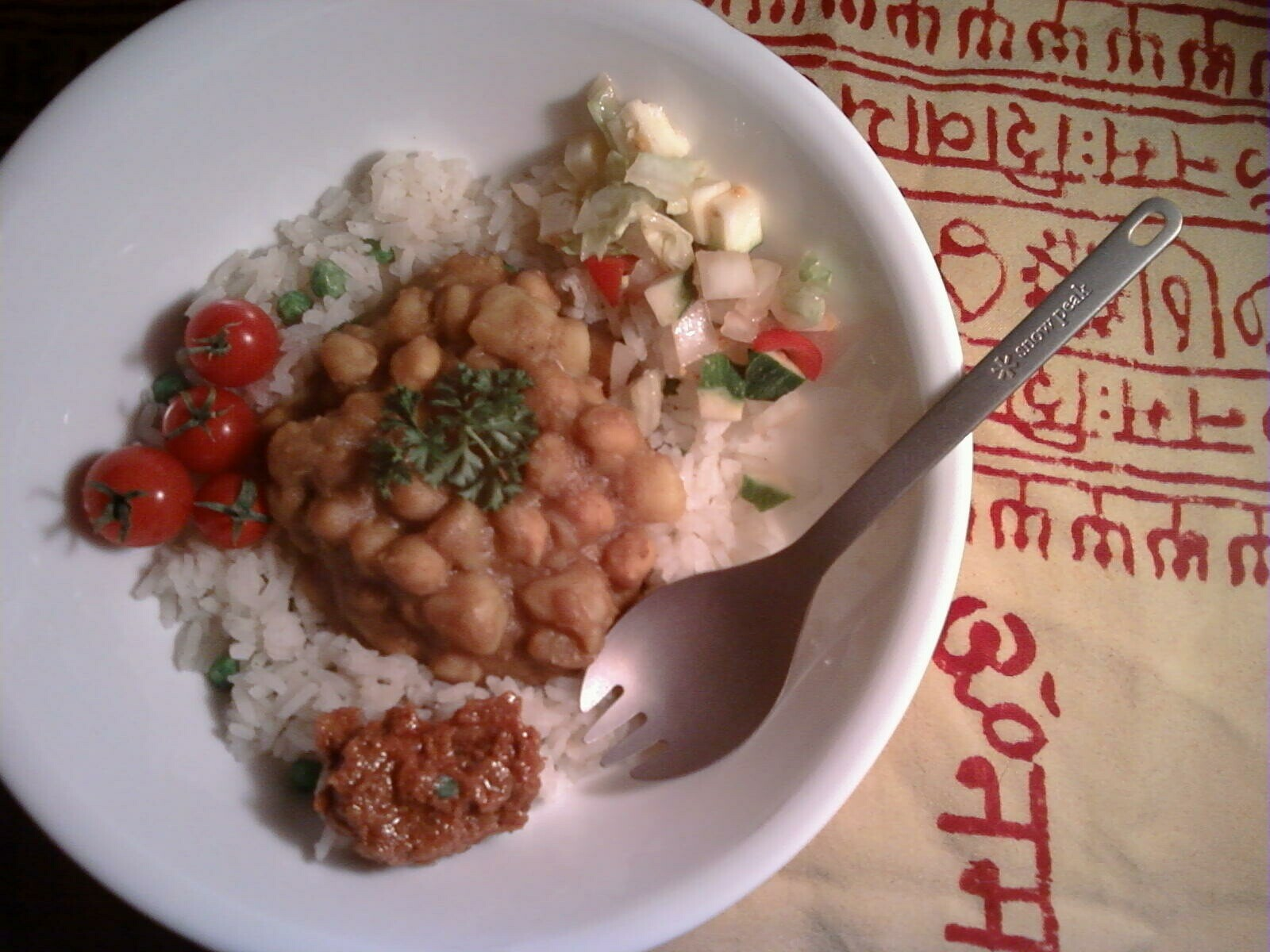
Awadhi light

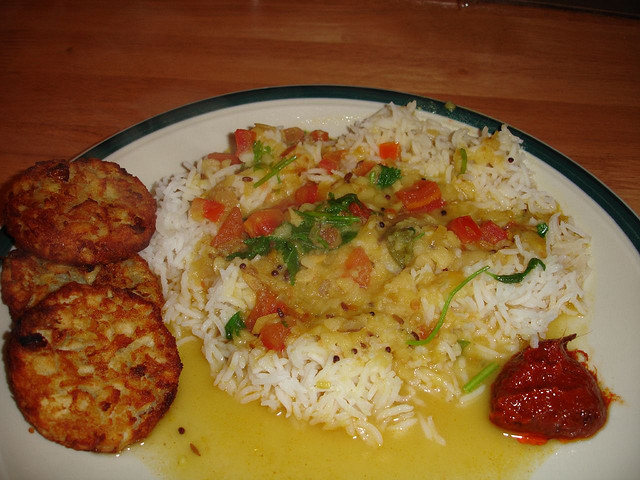
Awadhi daal rice

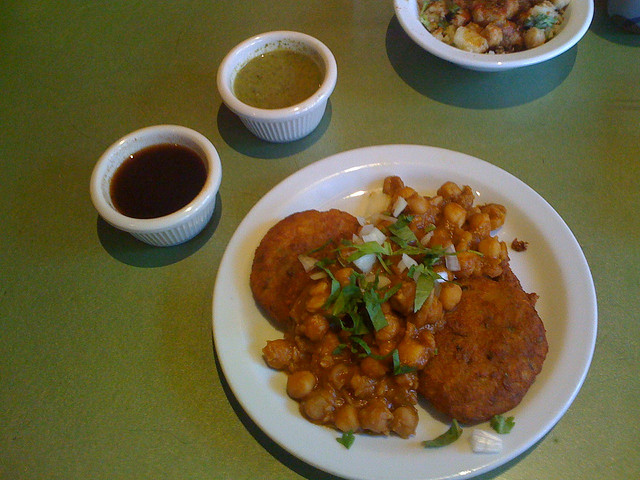
Awadhi chaat
Awadhi Non-Vegetarian and Nawabi dishes

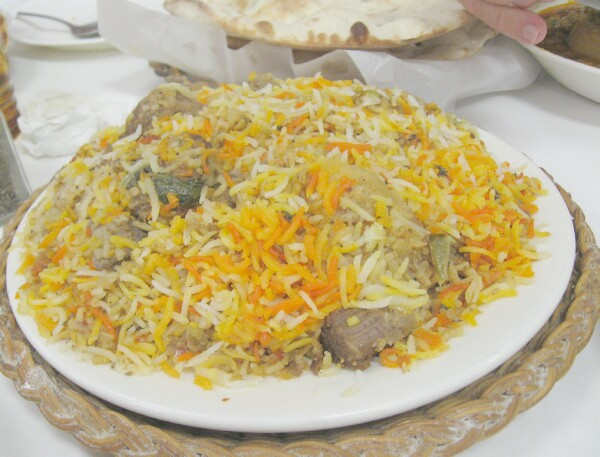
Awadhi mutton biryani

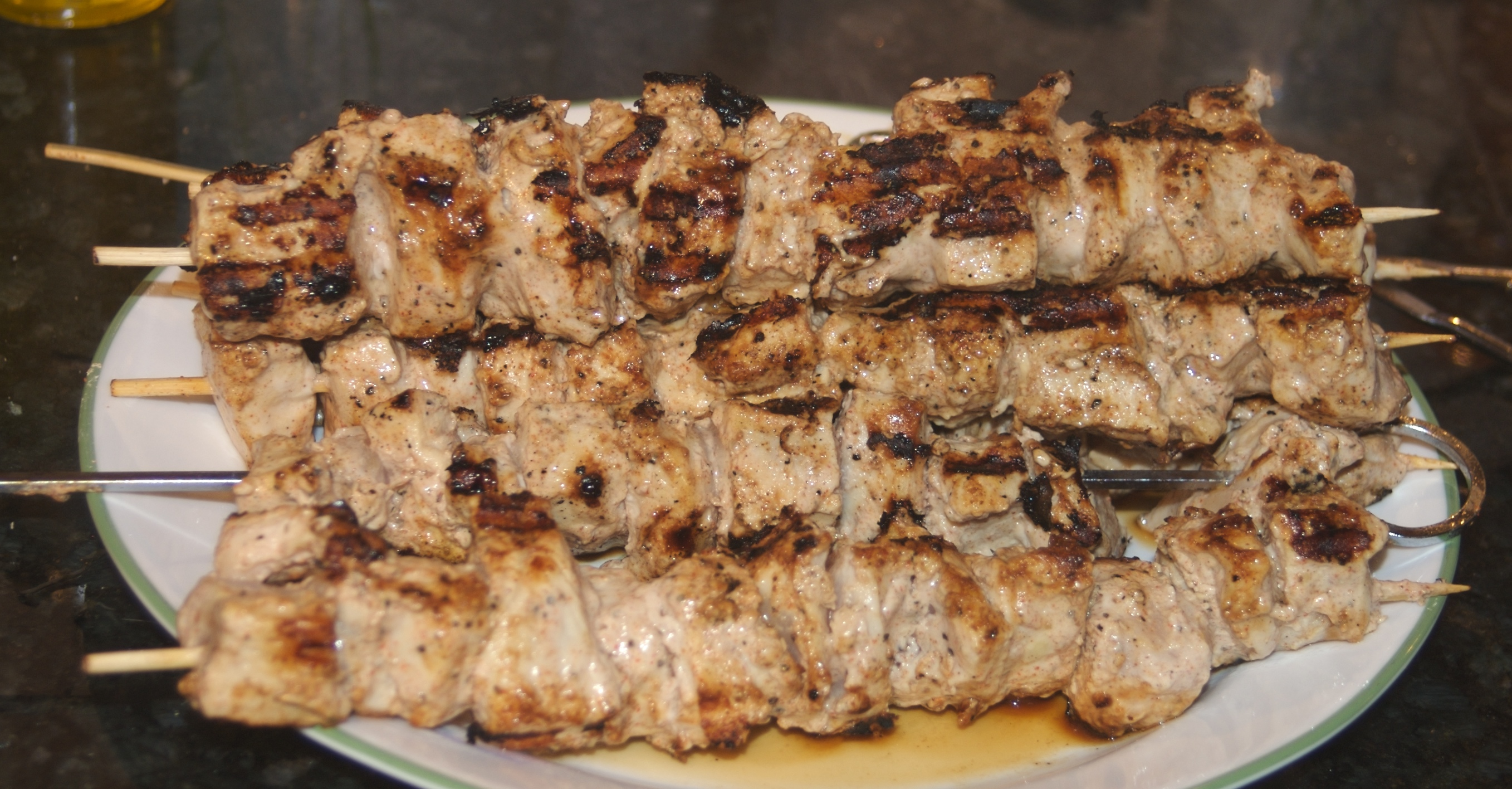
Awadhi seekh kebab

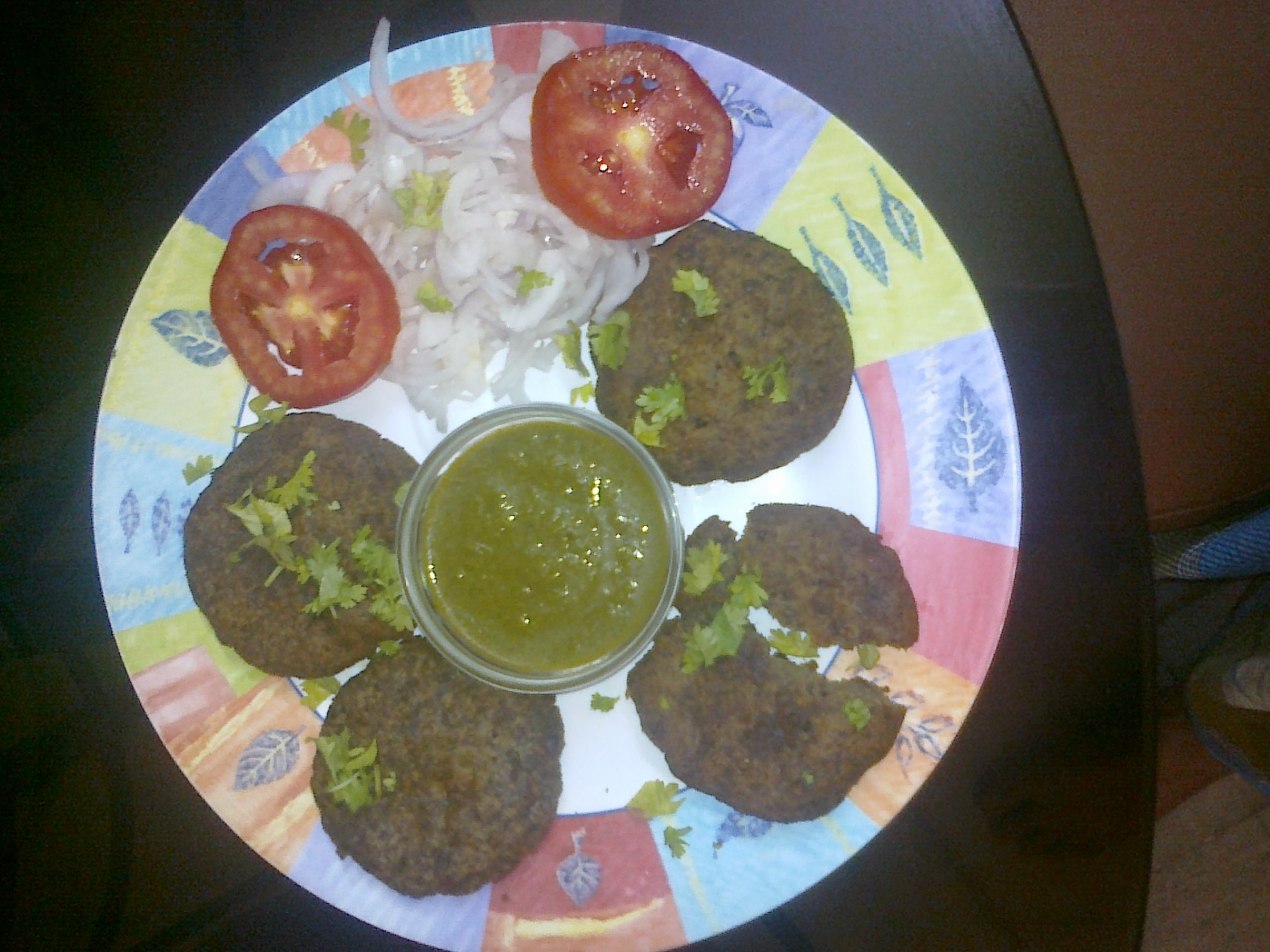
Shami kebab

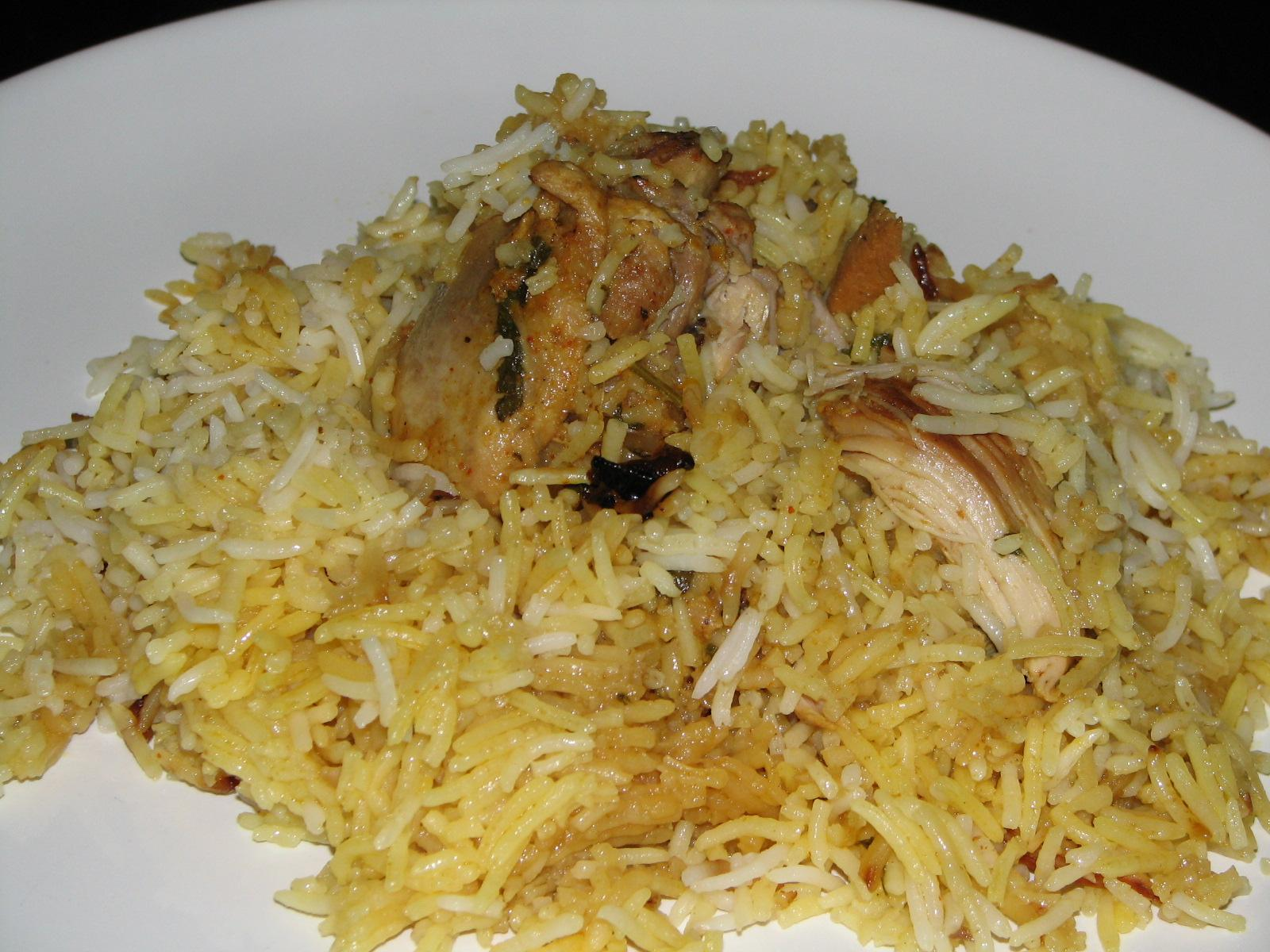
Awadhi chicken Dum Biryani

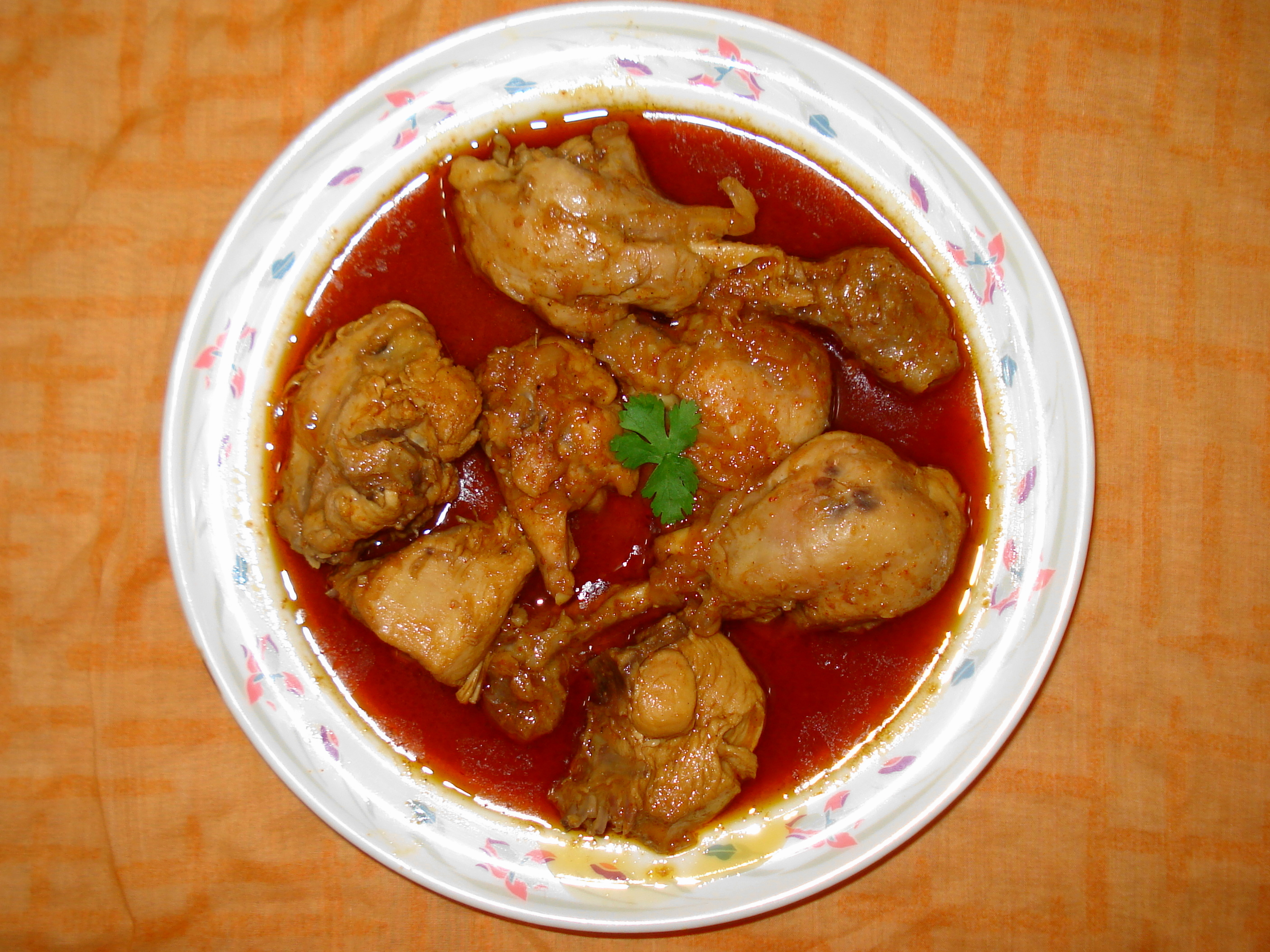
Chicken curry

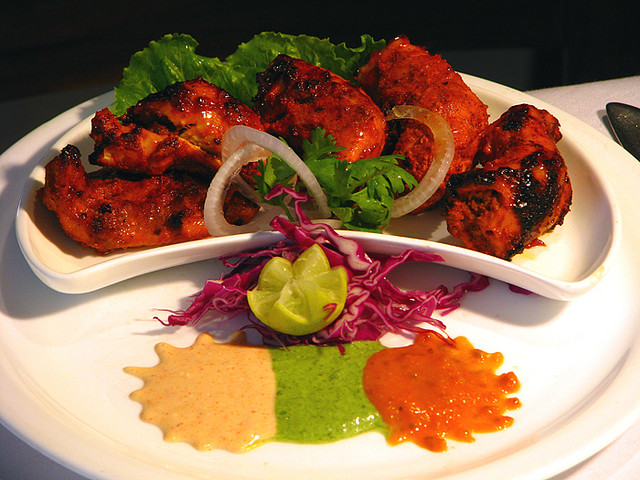
Tanduri chicken

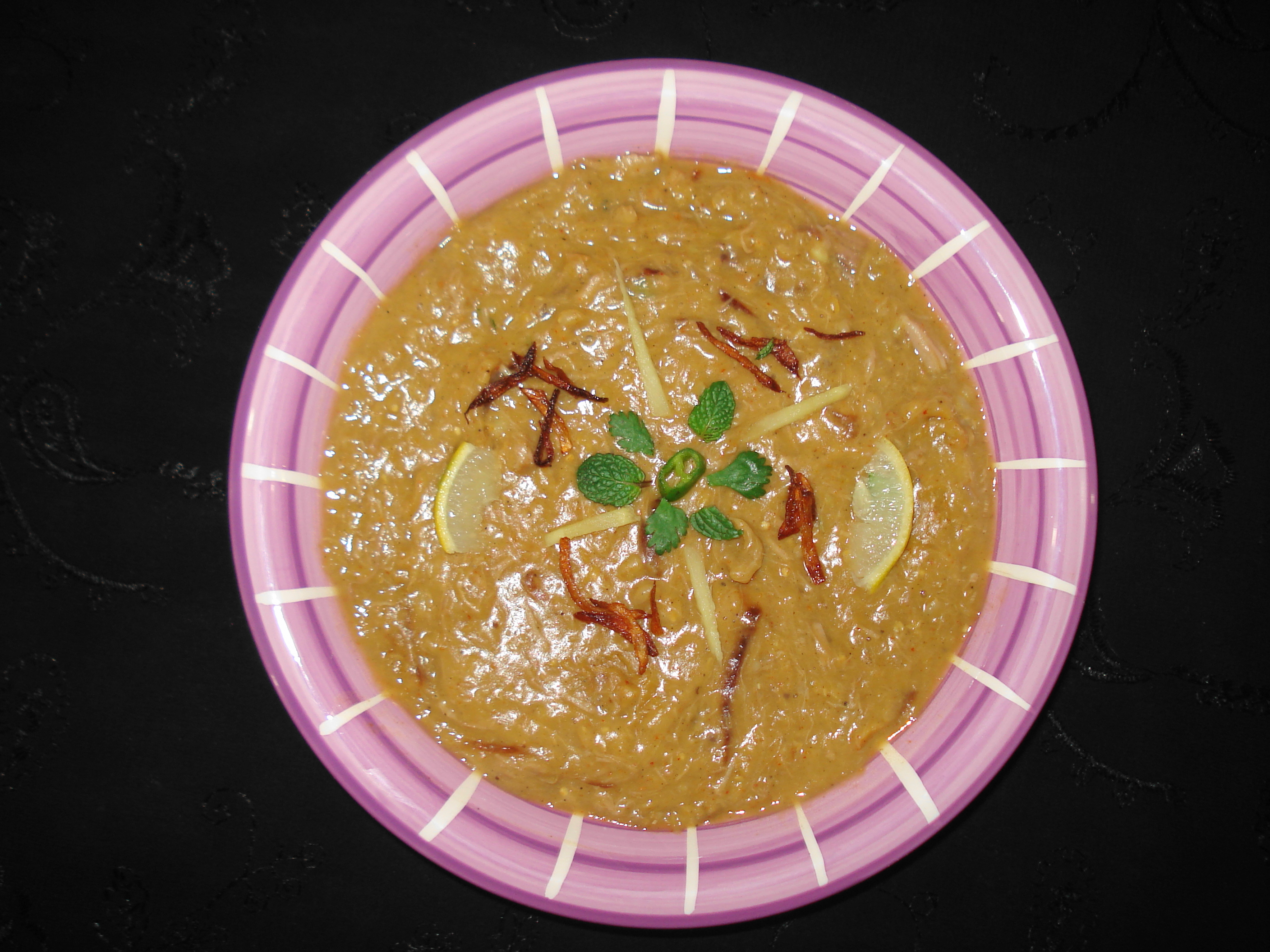
Haleem (Khichda)

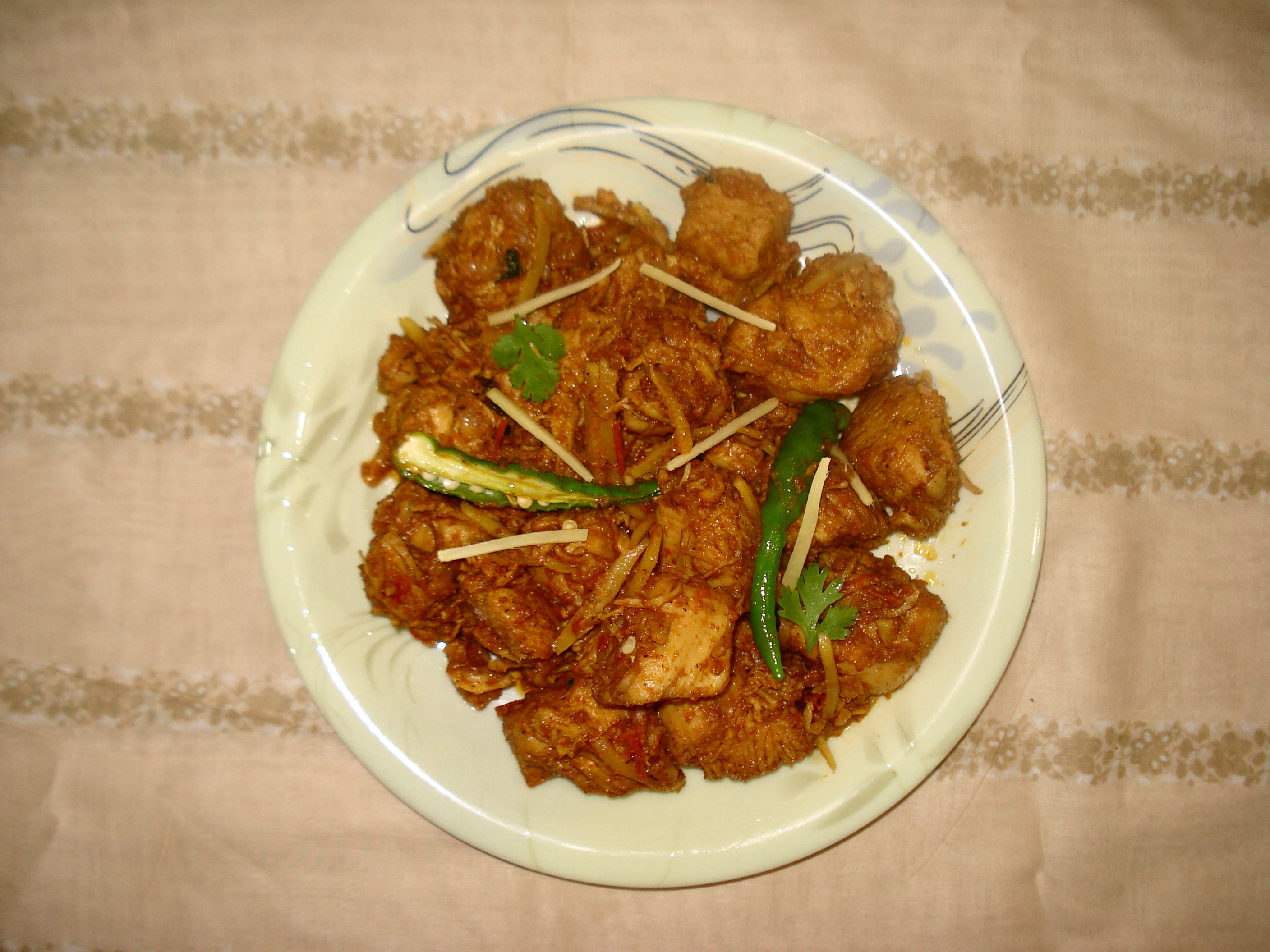
Chicken Ginger

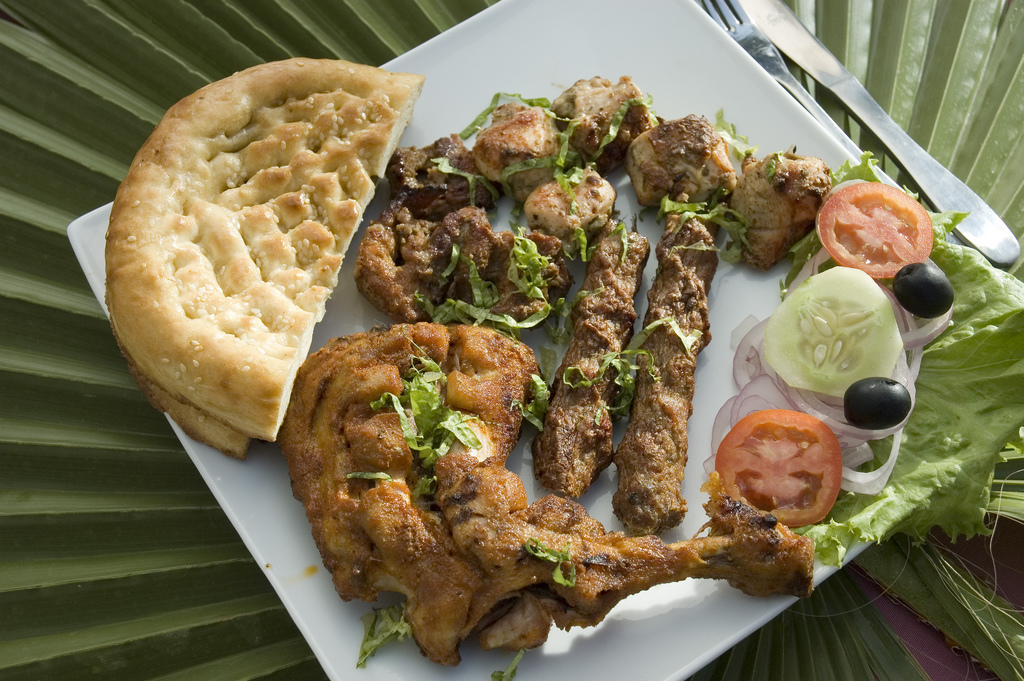
Chicken tikka

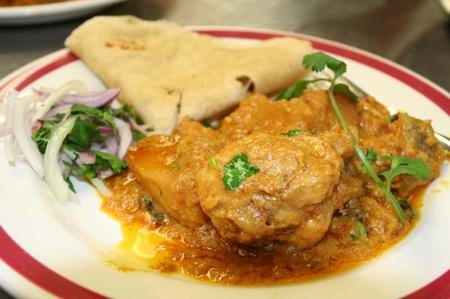
Chicken curry with chapatis

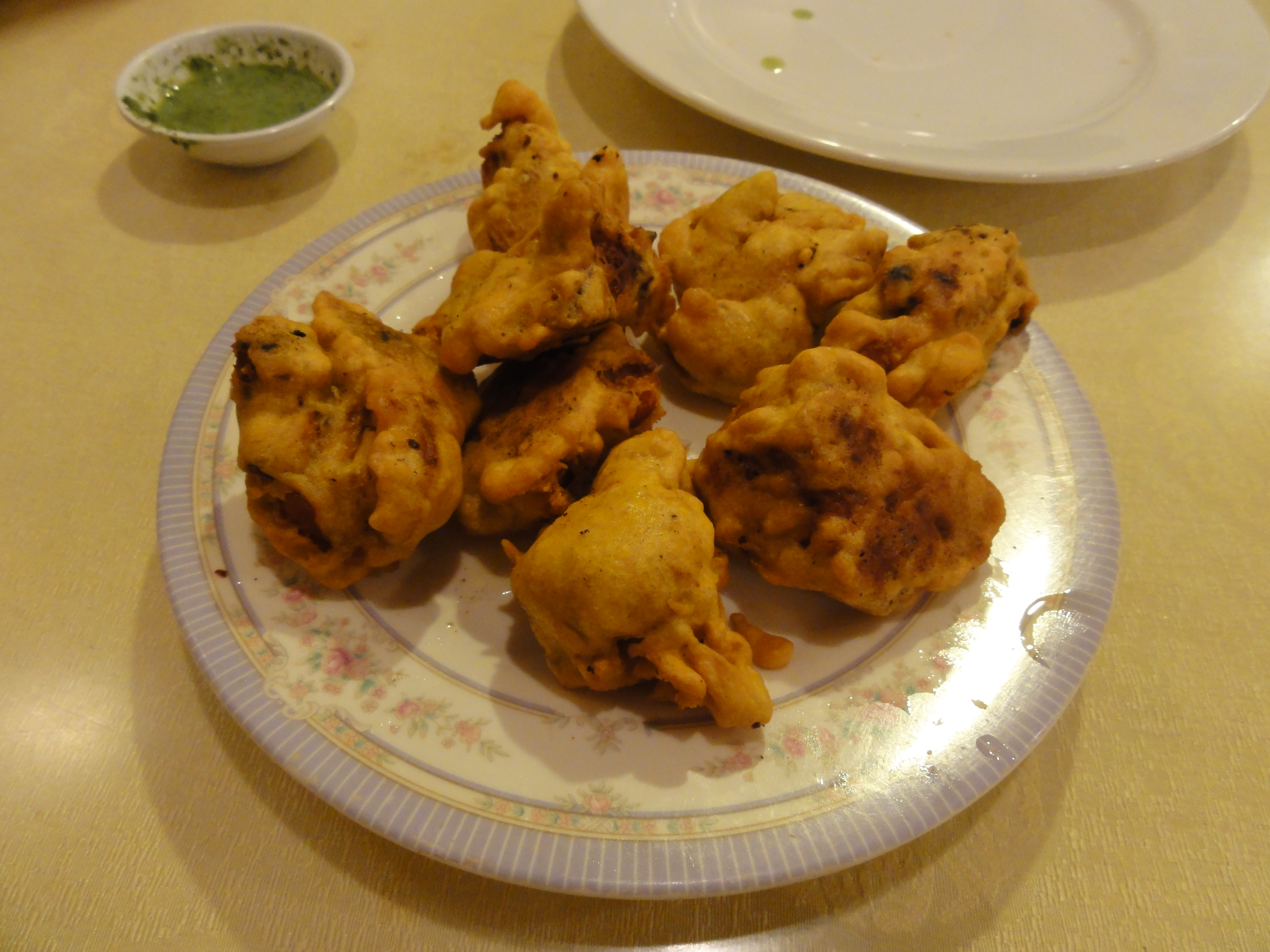
Chicken pakauda

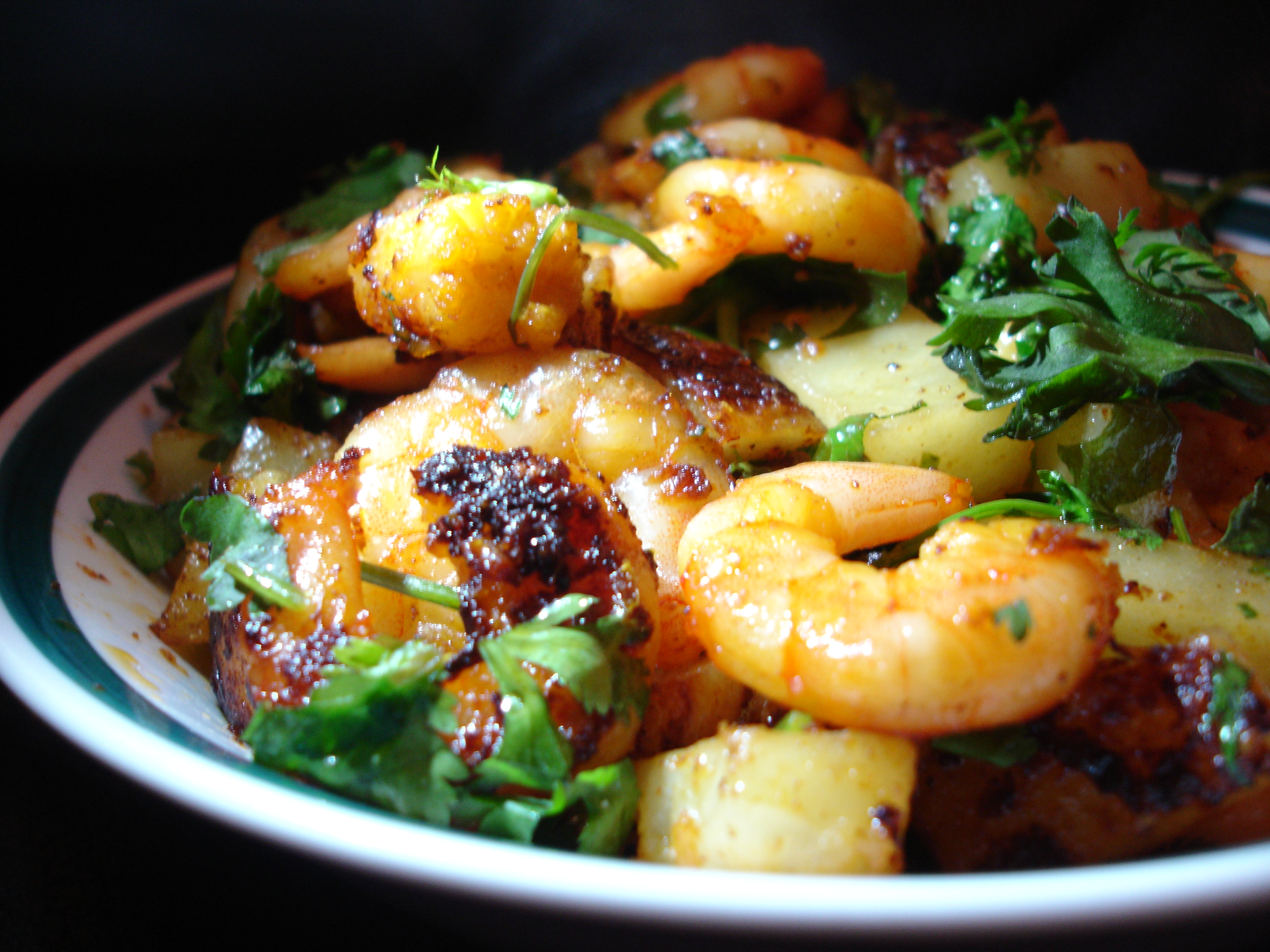
Awadhi prawns.

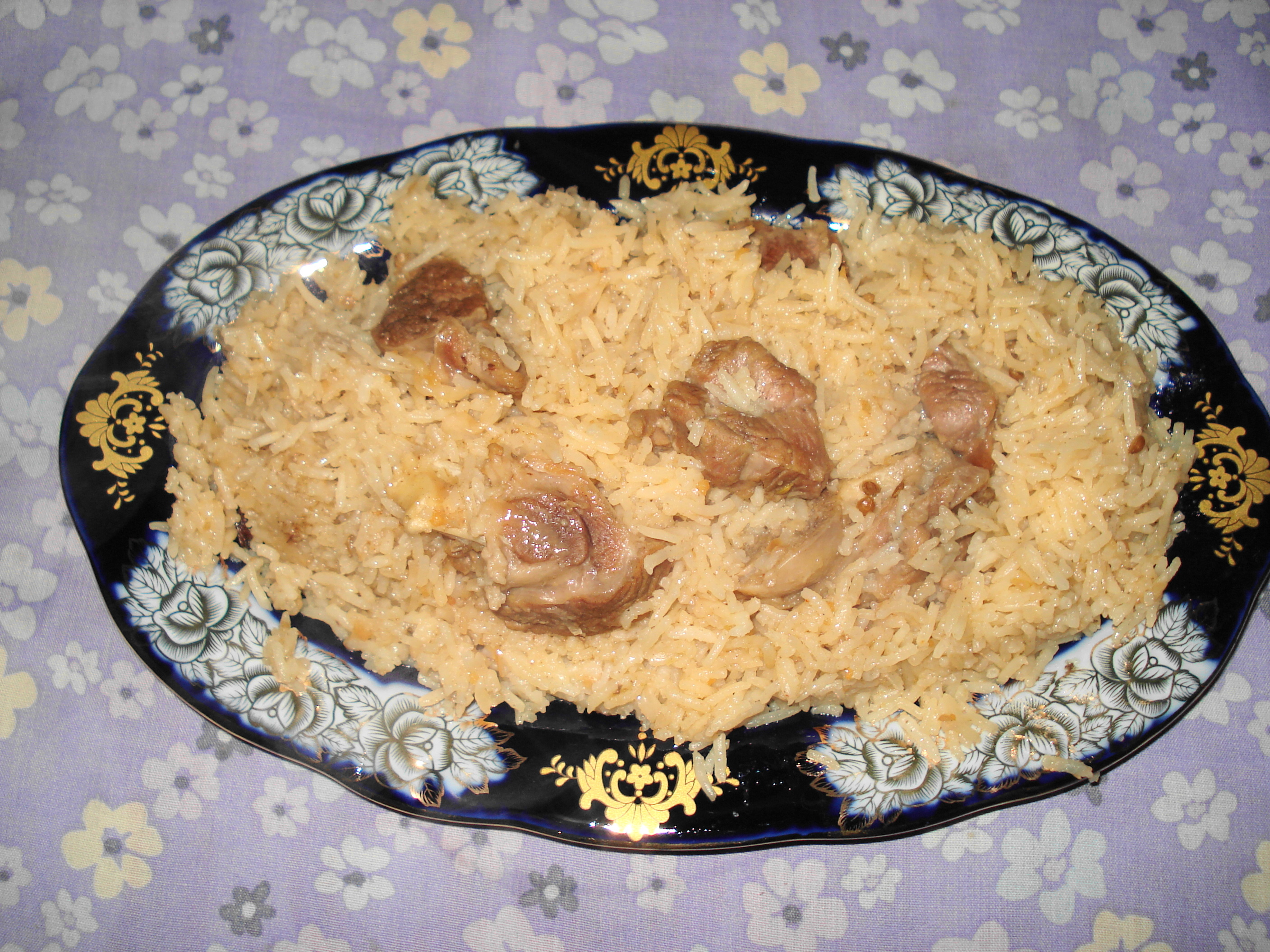
Pullao

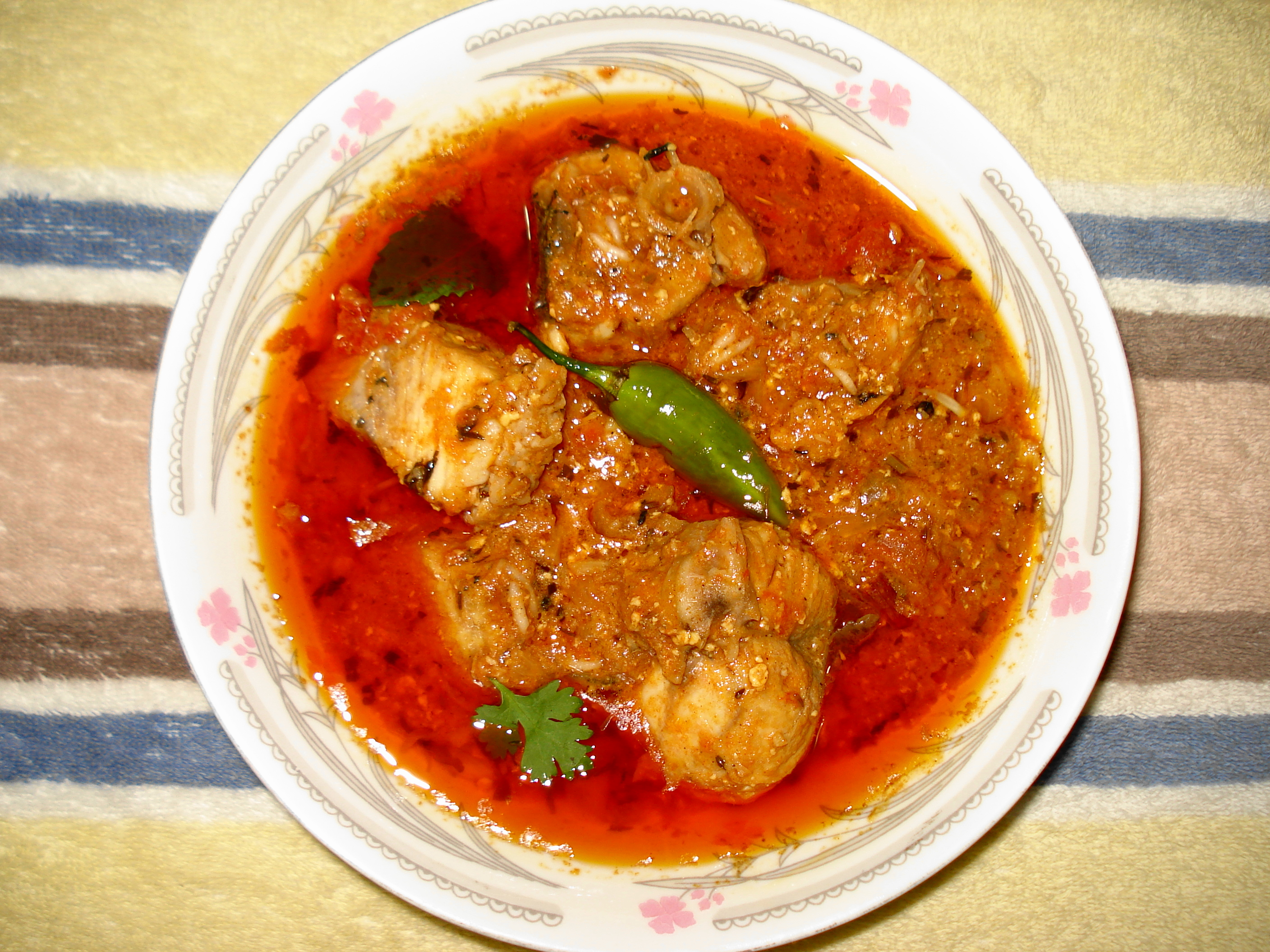
Fish curry

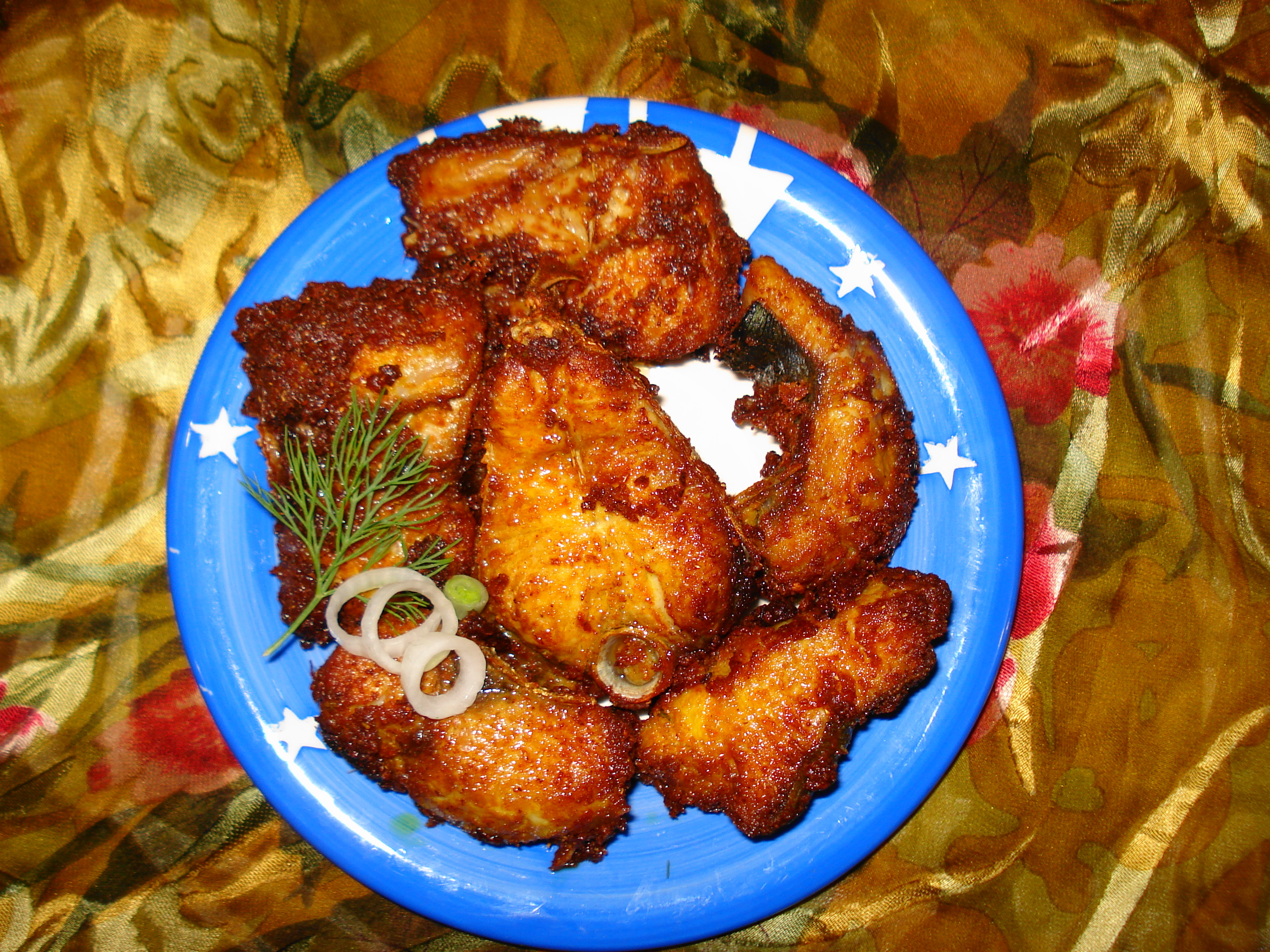
Fried Fish

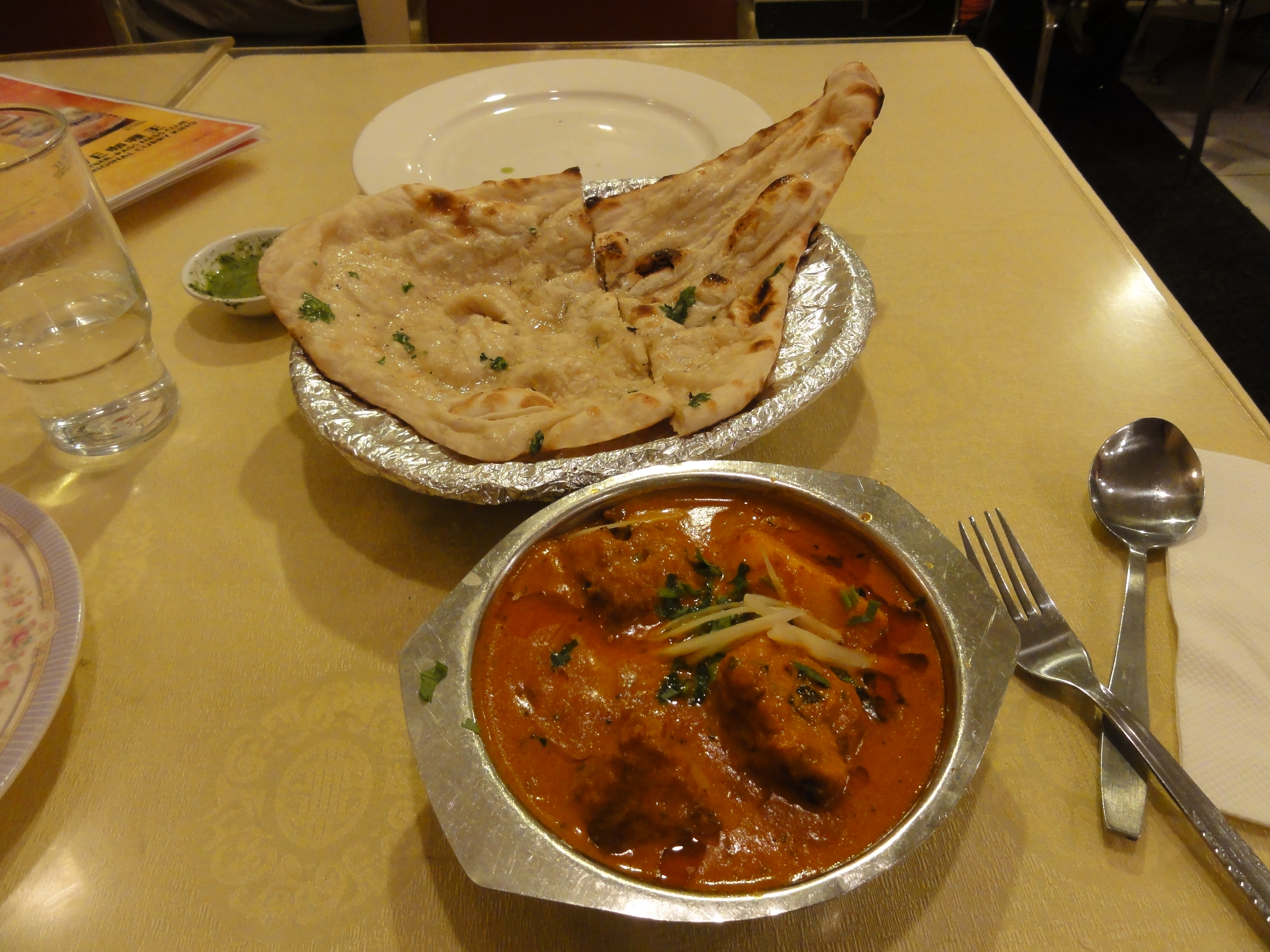
Naan with fish curry

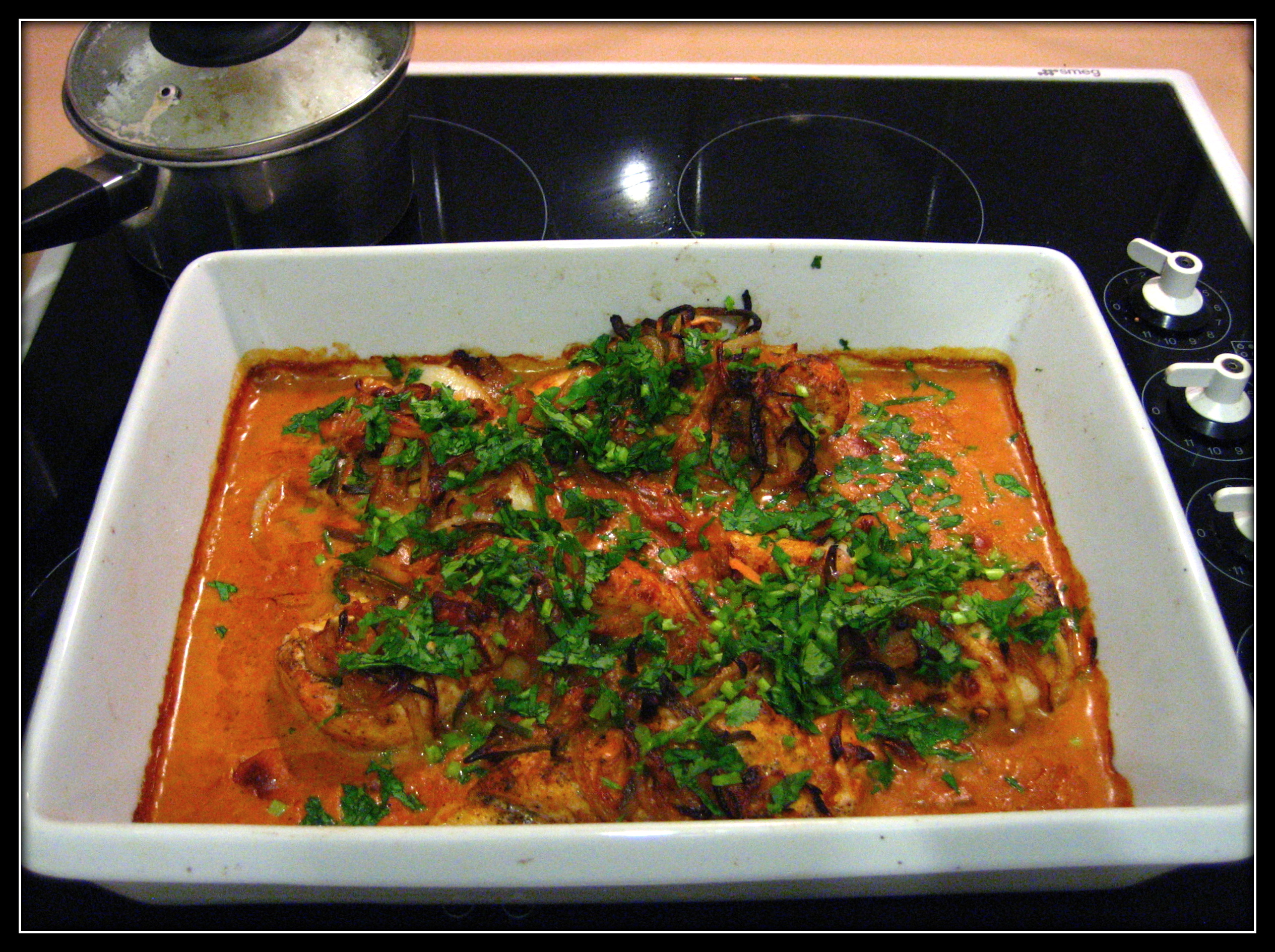
Awadhi oven chicken

== See also ==
- Cuisine of Uttar Pradesh
- Desi cuisine
- Faizabad
- Indian cuisine
