= L. Athira Krishna =

Aathira Krishna
- Also known as: Violin Aathira /Athira/ L. Athira Krishna/L. Athira
- Origin: Thiruvananthapuram, Kerala, India
- Genres: Carnatic rock, Indian rock, Carnatic Violin, folk rock, Jazz rock, Fusion
- Occupations: Violinist, singer, composer
- Instruments: Violin, Viola
- Website: athira.in

Aathira Krishna is an Indian violinist. She holds the Guinness World Record for her 32-hour-long non-stop Carnatic violin solo concert. She is among the youngest cultural ambassadors of India.

== Early years ==
Hailing from a musical family in Kerala, one of her ancestors was Vidwan Shri Gopala Pillai, a musician who belonged to the renowned Tanjore Tradition of Carnatic music.

Krishna is the daughter of K. C. Krishna Pillai and S. Leela Kurup. She had her intensive training under her grandfather Sangitha Vidwan. She showed music talent even as a toddler, when she would repeat back musical phrases she heard her father sing.

== Career ==
Krishna switched to violin from vocal at the age of eight and was soon hailed a child prodigy. She started performing as a Carnatic Violin soloist from the age of 9. Popularly hailed as the "Princess of Indian Violin", and honoured by the former First Lady of India Usha Narayanan as "The Musical Gem of India", she has represented Indian classical music at international music festivals.

Krishna was invited twice to perform at the Rashtrapati Bhavan, the Official Residence of the President of India. In 2001, as a child prodigy representing Indian classical music, she presented a paper presentation on "Violin in South Indian Classical Music" for the prestigious International Children's Assembly held at New Delhi. In 2002, she presented a unique thematic 'World Music Night' incorporating music genres of more than 20 nations for the year-long Millennium Celebrations in Kazakhizhtan.

In 2003, Krishna entered the Guinness Book of World Records for her 32-hour-long non-stop South Indian classical violin concert dedicated to global peace and harmony. Titled 'Nadhabrahma', this was also a tribute to her eminent grandfather. She also holds a place in the Limca Book of Records for the same feat. She was among the youngest of speakers for the Lecture Demonstration Section of Internal MuSIC Festival in Russia on the topic "Violin in Classical Indian Music". In 2005, she was invited by the Mayor of Menden, Germany to perform at the international music festival Jazz Meets Classics. She also became the first Indian classical musician to perform at the 1000-year-old church at Kaiserwerth, Germany.

In 2005, Krishna was invited to give the Inaugural Concert for the 74th birthday celebration of President of India, A.P.J. Abdul Kalam.

== Awards and honours ==
- Honored with the title of “The Musical Gem of India” by the former first lady of India, Usha Narayanan after hearing her at the Rashtrapathi Bhavan [official residence of the president of India].
- Honored by the Indian government’s prestigious “President’s National Balasree Honour” for “the best outstanding creative child musician of India”.
- Honored by the Guinness book of world records for her unique 32 hour-long non-stop violin concert dedicated to global peace and harmony.
- "Yuva Kala Bharathi Awards by Bharat Kalachar". hindu.com. Archived from the original on 14 September 2009.
- Princess of Strings Award 2006 from Rotasia World Conference.
- She is the only Indian classical musician to perform at the prestigious International Music Festival Jazz Meets Classics in Germany.
