= Shah Jahan Begum =

Shah Jahan Begum may refer to:

- Shah Jahan Begum of Bhopal, begum of Bhopal State
- Shah Jahan Begum (First Lady), wife of Zakir Husain, the 3rd President of India
