= The Book Review =

- Discipline: Book review
- Language: English
- Edited by: Chandra Chari; Uma Iyengar

Publication details
- History: 1976–present
- Publisher: Perspective Publications (India)
- Frequency: Monthly

Standard abbreviations
- ISO 4: Book Rev.

Indexing
- ISSN: 0970-4175
- OCLC no.: 2594657

Links
- Journal homepage

The Book Review is an Indian peer-reviewed academic journal covering reviews for books of various subjects. Regarded as India's first English-language review journal, it was founded in January 1976 by Chitra Narayanan, Uma Iyengar, and Chandra Chari; the latter two are the editor-in-chiefs. In 1985, the journal was ceased from publication but was revived two years later.
