= Rajvanshi Devi =

Former First Lady of India

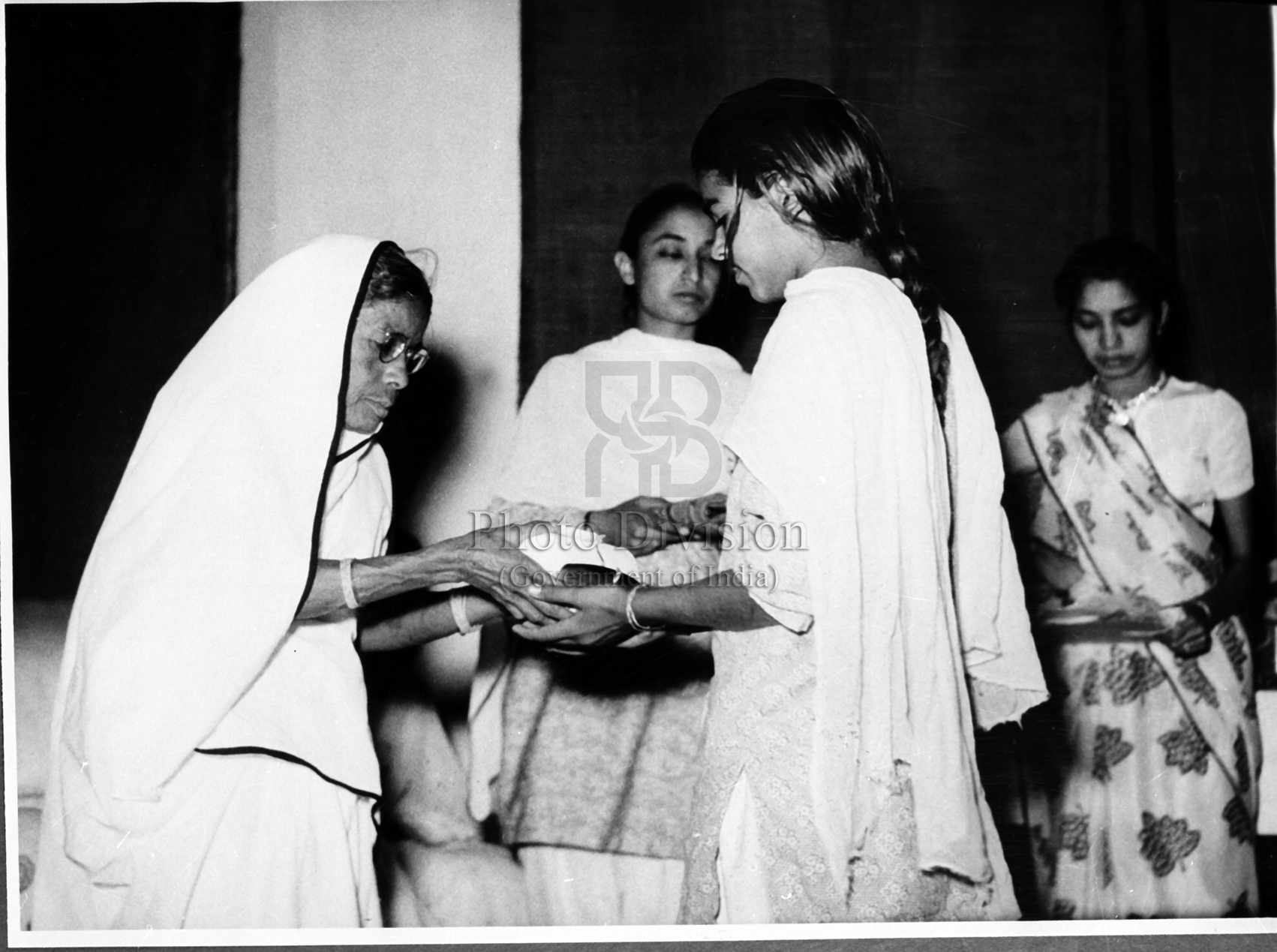
- Rajvanshi Devi giving Annual Prize of Government House Estate School at Rashtrapati Bhavan

First Lady of India
- In office 26 January 1950 – 12 May 1962
- President: Rajendra Prasad
- Preceded by: Office established
- Succeeded by: Shah Jahan Begum

Personal details
- Born: 17 July 1886 Chhapra, Bengal Presidency
- Died: 9 September 1962 (aged 76) Patna, Bihar, India
- Spouse: Rajendra Prasad (m. 1896; died 1963)
- Children: Mrityunjay Prasad
- Occupation: Freedom fighter

Rajvanshi Devi (17 July 1886 – 9 September 1962) was an Indian freedom fighter who served as the 1st First Lady of India as the spouse of Rajendra Prasad, President of India. She married Rajendra Prasad in June 1896 at Dalan Chhapra Village, Ballia district, when they were both quite young. She was a very private individual .

== Early life ==
Rajvanshi Devi was born on July 17, 1886. Her father was a mukhtiyar (a type of attorney) in Arrah, and her brother was a lawyer in Ballia. She was known as a traditional Hindu lady. She was also a freedom fighter who, along with Chandrawati Devi, was arrested in 1947 for celebrating the Indian independence movement in Patna. Her Birth Place While the exact location of her birth isn't widely documented, records indicate her marriage took place at Dalan Chhapra Village in the Ballia district. Her family had ties to Arrah and Ballia.

== First Lady Of India ==
Her Term as First Lady Rajvanshi Devi served as the First Lady of India from January 26, 1950, to May 12, 1962, coinciding with her husband's presidency. Unlike her husband, she maintained a very low profile during his tenure and generally avoided public events.

== Personal life and death ==
Rajvanshi Devi died on September 9, 1962, at the age of 76. Following her death, her husband, Dr. Rajendra Prasad, donated her jewelry to India's treasury during the Sino-Indian War. Her death was a significant factor in the deterioration of Dr. Prasad's health, who died just a few months later. Her father was mukhtiyar in Arrah and her brother was lawyer in Ballia. She was a true-to-tradition Hindu lady. She married Rajendra Prasad in June 1896 at Dalan Chhapra Village, Ballia district, when he was 12 years old. In 1947, she, along with Chandrawati Devi, was arrested for celebrating Indian independence movement at Patna. She inaugurated Rajendra Prasad's Hospital.

== Honor ==
- In 1962, a higher secondary school built in Siwan, Bihar was named after.
