= List of state visits received by Willem-Alexander of the Netherlands =

State visits made and received by King Willem-Alexander of the Netherlands

Below is a complete list of state visits received by Willem-Alexander of the Netherlands. Two to three state visits are usually received each year by King Willem-Alexander and Queen Máxima. Today a state visit is accompanied by large trade delegations and is seen as an important venue to promote trade and other business relations as well as cultural and political ties between the two countries.

== State visits received by King Willem-Alexander ==
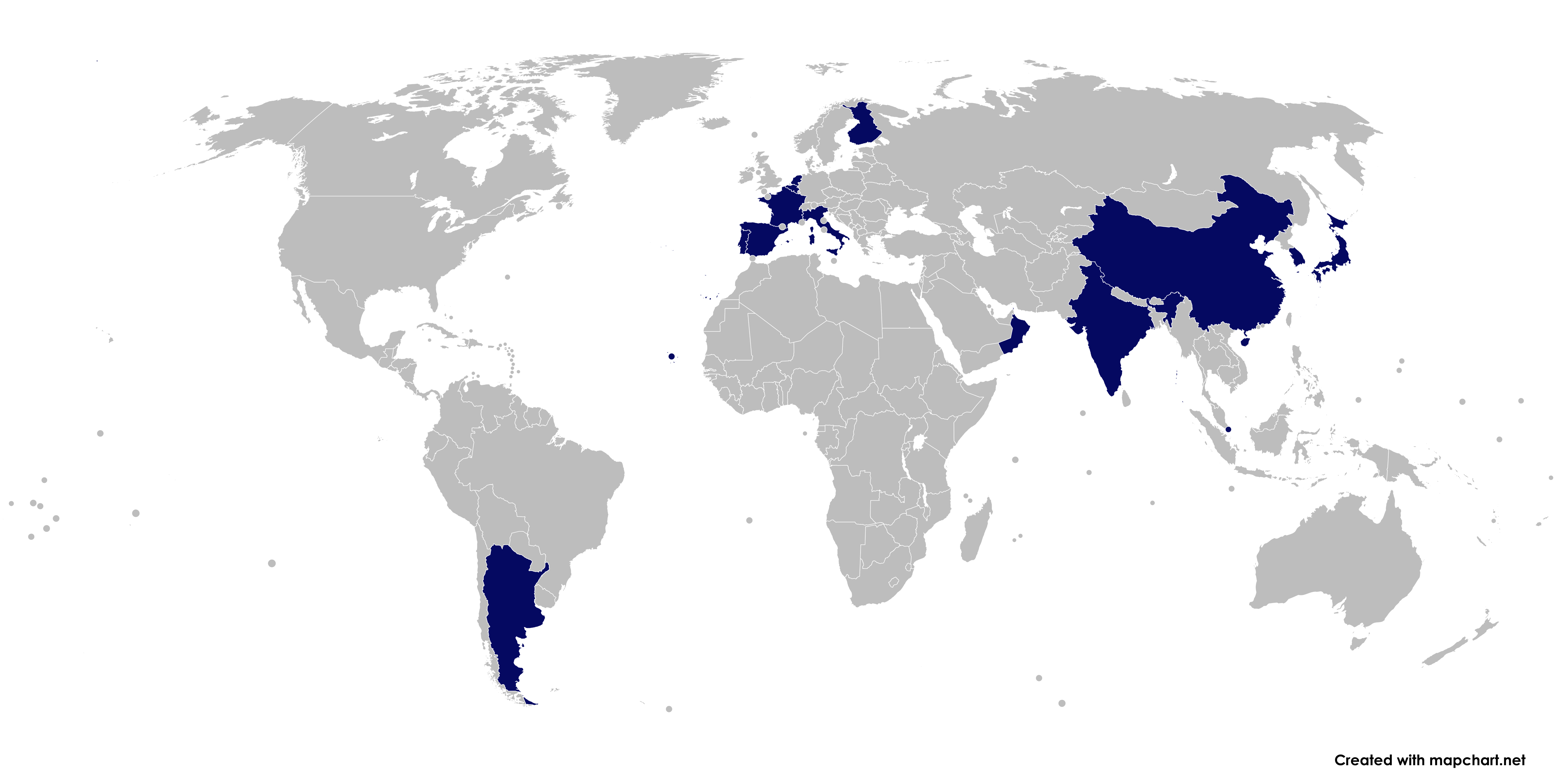
Map of countries that paid a visit

represents a state visit in the future

No.	Date	Country	Regime	Guests	Ref
2010s
1	22–23 March 2014	China	Republic	President Xi Jinping; First Lady Peng Liyuan	
2	28–30 November 2016	Belgium	Monarchy	King Philippe; Queen Mathilde	
3	27–28 March 2017	Argentina	Republic	President Mauricio Macri; First Lady Juliana Awada	
4	21–22 November 2018	Singapore	Republic	President Halimah Yacob; First Gentleman Mohamed Abdullah Alhabshee	
5	10–11 December 2018	Cape Verde	Republic	President Jorge Carlos Fonseca; First Lady Lígia Fonseca	
2020s
6	5–7 April 2022	India	Republic	President Ram Nath Kovind; First Lady Savita Kovind	
7	9–11 November 2022	Italy	Republic	President Sergio Mattarella; Mrs Laura Mattarella	
8	11–12 April 2023	France	Republic	President Emmanuel Macron; Mrs Brigitte Macron	
9	12–13 December 2023	South Korea	Republic	President Yoon Suk Yeol; First Lady Kim Keon-hee	
10	17–18 April 2024	Spain	Monarchy	King Felipe VI; Queen Letizia	
11	10–11 December 2024	Portugal	Republic	President Marcelo Rebelo de Sousa	
12	15–16 April 2025	Oman	Monarchy	Sultan Haitham bin Tariq	
13	11–12 December 2025	Finland	Republic	President Alexander Stubb; Mrs Suzanne Innes-Stubb	
14	9–11 June 2026	Germany	Republic	President Frank-Walter Steinmeier; Mrs Elke Büdenbender	
15	17–19 June 2026	Japan	Monarchy	Emperor Naruhito; Empress Masako	

== Countries that made state visits ==
Countries	State visits	Notes
Argentina	1	
Belgium	1	
Cape Verde	1	
China	1	
Finland	1	
France	1	
Germany	1	
India	1	
Italy	1	
Japan	1	
Oman	1	
Portugal	1	
Singapore	1	
South Korea	1	
Spain	1	

== See also ==
- List of official overseas trips made by Willem-Alexander of the Netherlands
