= Ismail Hossain =

Ismail Hossain may refer to:

- Ismail Hossain Khan, Indian politician
- Ismail Hossain Siraji, Bangladeshi poet
- Ismail Hossain Talukder, Bangladeshi politician
- Md Ismail Hossain, Bangladeshi police officer
- Ismail Hussain, Indian politician
