= List of official overseas trips made by Willem-Alexander of the Netherlands =

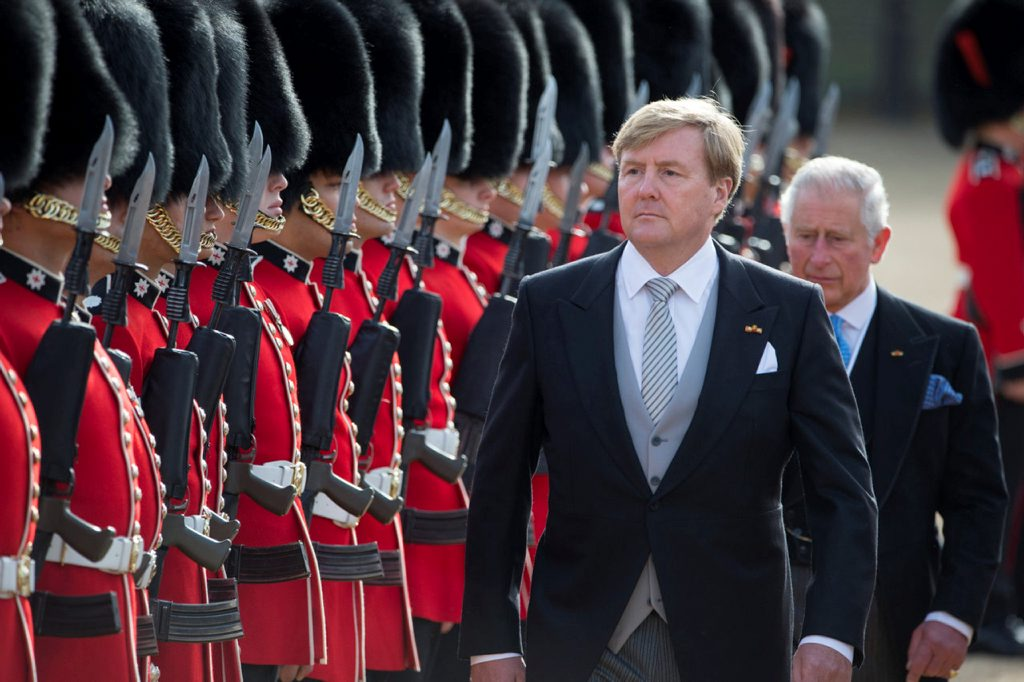
Willem-Alexander accompanied by Charles the then-Prince of Wales and now King of the United Kingdom, during his state visit to the UK. Willem-Alexander and Charles are fifth cousins once removed.

The following is a list of state visits made by Willem-Alexander, King of the Netherlands since he ascended to the Dutch throne in April 2013 following the abdication of his mother, Beatrix that year.

== List of state visits ==
Map of countries visited

Date(s)	Country	Host(s)	Ref
8–11 November 2013	Russia	President Vladimir Putin	
24–25 June 2014	Poland	President Bronisław Komorowski and Anna Komorowska	
28–31 October 2014	Japan	Emperor Akihito and Empress Michiko	
3–4 November 2014	South Korea	President Park Geun-hye	
17–19 March 2015	Denmark	Queen Margrethe II and Prince Consort Henrik	
27–29 March 2015	Canada	Governor General David Johnston and Sharon Johnston	
25–29 October 2015	China	President Xi Jinping and Peng Liyuan	
10–11 March 2016	France	President François Hollande	
31 October–4 November 2016	Australia	Governor-General Sir Peter Cosgrove and Lady Lynne Cosgrove	
7–9 November 2016	New Zealand	Governor-General Dame Patsy Reddy and Sir David Gascoigne	
20–23 June 2017	Italy	President Sergio Mattarella and Laura Mattarella	
22 June 2017	Vatican City	Pope Francis	
10–12 October 2017	Portugal	President Marcelo Rebelo de Sousa	
23–25 May 2018	Luxembourg	Grand Duke Henri and Grand Duchess Maria Teresa	
11–12 June 2018	Latvia (Note: Queen Máxima did not participate in the state visit following the demise of her sister.)	President Raimonds Vējonis and Iveta Vējone	
12–13 June 2018	Estonia	President Kersti Kaljulaid and Georgi-Rene Maksimovski	
13–15 June 2018	Lithuania	President Dalia Grybauskaitė	
23–24 October 2018	United Kingdom	Queen Elizabeth II	
12–14 June 2019	Ireland	President Michael D. Higgins and Sabina Higgins	
14–18 October 2019	India	President Ram Nath Kovind and Savita Kovind	
10–12 March 2020	Indonesia	President Joko Widodo and Iriana	
5–7 July 2021	Germany	President Frank-Walter Steinmeier and Elke Büdenbender	
9–11 November 2021	Norway	King Harald V and Queen Sonja	
27–29 June 2022	Austria	President Alexander Van der Bellen and Doris Schmidauer	
18–19 September 2022	United Kingdom	King Charles III	
11–13 October 2022	Sweden	King Carl XVI Gustaf and Queen Silvia	
31 October–2 November 2022	Greece	President Katerina Sakellaropoulou and Pavlos Kotsonis	
7–9 March 2023	Slovakia	President Zuzana Čaputová and Juraj Rizman	
5–6 May 2023	United Kingdom	King Charles III and Queen Camilla	
20–22 June 2023	Belgium	King Philippe and Queen Mathilde	
18–20 October 2023	South Africa	President Cyril Ramaphosa	
27 January 2025	Poland	President Andrzej Duda	
4–5 March 2025	Cyprus	President Nikos Christodoulides and Philippa Christodoulides	
18–20 March 2025	Kenya	President William Ruto and Rachel Ruto	
4–5 June 2025	Czech Republic	President Petr Pavel and Eva Pavlová	
1–3 December 2025	Suriname	President Jennifer Geerlings-Simons	

== See also ==
- List of state visits received by Willem-Alexander of the Netherlands
