= Fakhruddin Ali Ahmed =

President of India from 1974 to 1977

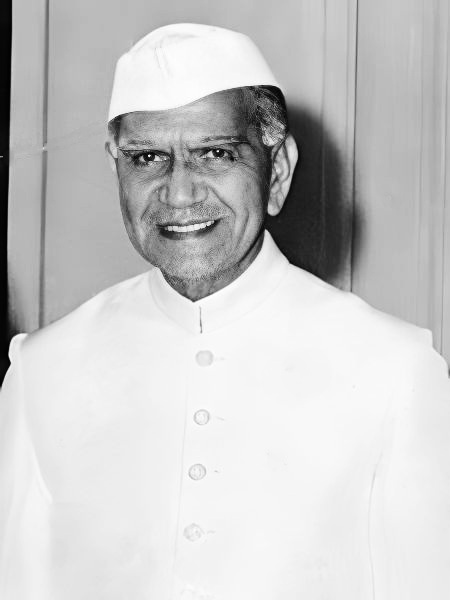
- Ahmed in 1976

President of India
- In office 24 August 1974 – 11 February 1977
- Prime Minister: Indira Gandhi
- Vice President: Gopal Swarup Pathak; B. D. Jatti
- Preceded by: V. V. Giri
- Succeeded by: B. D. Jatti (acting); Neelam Sanjiva Reddy

Union Minister of Food and Agriculture
- In office 27 June 1970 – 3 July 1974
- Prime Minister: Indira Gandhi
- Preceded by: Jagjivan Ram
- Succeeded by: C. Subramaniam

Union Minister of Industrial Development, Internal Trade and Company Affairs
- In office 13 March 1967 – 27 June 1970
- Prime Minister: Indira Gandhi
- Preceded by: Damodaram Sanjivayya
- Succeeded by: Dinesh Singh

Union Minister of Education
- In office 13 November 1966 – 12 March 1967
- Prime Minister: Indira Gandhi
- Preceded by: M. C. Chagla
- Succeeded by: Triguna Sen

Union Minister of Irrigation and Power
- In office 29 January 1966 – 13 November 1966
- Prime Minister: Indira Gandhi
- Preceded by: Kanuri Lakshmana Rao
- Succeeded by: Kanuri Lakshmana Rao

Member of Parliament, Rajya Sabha
- In office 3 April 1966 – 25 February 1967
- Constituency: Assam
- In office 3 April 1954 – 25 March 1957
- Constituency: Assam

Member of Parliament, Lok Sabha
- In office 1967–1974
- Preceded by: Renuka Devi Barkataki
- Succeeded by: Ismail Hossain Khan
- Constituency: Barpeta, Assam

Member of Assam Legislative Assembly
- In office 1937–1946
- Prime Minister: Muhammed Saadulah
- Succeeded by: Moulvi Abdul Hai
- Constituency: Kamrup (North)

Personal details
- Born: 13 May 1905 Delhi, British India (present-day India)
- Died: 11 February 1977 (aged 71) New Delhi, Delhi, India
- Party: Indian National Congress
- Spouse: Abida Ahmed (m. 1945)
- Children: 3
- Education: St. Stephen's College, Delhi; University of Cambridge; Inner Temple
- Profession: Lawyer; politician

Fakhruddin Ali Ahmed (Assamese pronunciation: [ɸɔkʱɹudːin ali aɦmɛd]; 13 May 1905 – 11 February 1977) was an Indian lawyer and politician who served as the President of India from 1974 to 1977.

Born in Delhi, Ahmed studied in Delhi and Cambridge and was called to the bar from the Inner Temple, London in 1928. Returning to India, he practised law in Lahore and then in Guwahati. Beginning a long association with the Indian National Congress in the 1930s, Ahmed was finance minister of Assam in the Gopinath Bordoloi ministry in 1939. He became the Advocate General of Assam in 1946, and was finance minister again from 1957 to 1966 under Bimala Prasad Chaliha. He was made a national Cabinet Minister by Prime Minister Indira Gandhi in 1966 and was in charge of various central ministries including Power, Irrigation, Industries and Agriculture. He was elected President of India in 1974, securing a greater confidence than his contestant Tridib Chaudhuri.

As President, Ahmed imposed The Emergency in June 1975 and gave his assent to numerous ordinances and constitutional amendments drafted by Indira Gandhi to rule by decree. Lampooned in an iconic cartoon by Abu Abraham, Ahmed's reputation was tarnished by his support for the Emergency. His Presidency had been described as a rubber stamp.

Ahmed died in February 1977 of a heart attack. He was accorded a state funeral and is buried in a mosque near Parliament House in New Delhi. Ahmed, who was the second Muslim to become the president of India, was also the second president to die in office. Ahmed was succeeded by B. D. Jatti as interim president and by Neelam Sanjiva Reddy as the sixth president of India in 1977.

== Early life and family ==
Ahmed was born in Delhi on 13 May 1905, to a Muslim family. Ahmed's grandfather, Baharuddin Ali Ahmed, was an Islamic scholar and his father, Col. Zalnur Ali was a doctor who belonged to the Indian Medical Service and is thought to be the first medical graduate from Assam. Ahmed's mother, Sahibzadi Ruqayya Sultan, was a daughter of the Nawab of the princely state of Loharu. Ahmed was one of ten children, including five sons, of Colonel Ali. In 2018 it emerged that several of Ahmed's relatives were left out of the National Register of Citizens for Assam as they could not produce documents to prove their antecedents.

== Education and legal career ==
Ahmed attended government high schools in Gonda, United Provinces and in Delhi. He attended St. Stephen's College, Delhi during 1921–22, before leaving for England. He passed his history tripos from St Catharine's College, Cambridge in 1927. He was called to the bar from the Inner Temple, London in 1928. He returned to India the same year and practiced law at the Lahore High Court before moving to Guwahati in 1930 where he worked initially as a junior lawyer under Nabin Chandra Bardoloi. At Guwahati, Ahmed, who later became the Advocate General for the state, was the founding president of the Bar Association of the Assam High Court after its formation in 1948.

== Role in the Indian National Congress ==
Ahmed joined the Indian National Congress as a primary member in 1931 and was a member of the Assam Pradesh Congress Committee, the Working Committee of the Assam Pradesh Congress Committee and the All India Congress Committee from 1936 onwards, except for short breaks. He was a member of the Working Committee of the All India Congress Committee in 1946–47 and again from 1964 to 1974 during which period he was also a member of the Parliamentary Board of the party.

== Electoral career in pre-Independence India ==
Ahmed was elected to the legislative assembly of Assam in the provincial elections of 1937 which were held in accordance with the Government of India Act, 1935. He was one of three Muslim ministers in the Congress government headed by Gopinath Bordoloi, serving as Minister for Finance, Revenue and Labour from 20 September 1938 to 16 November 1939.

In his budget for 1939–40, Ahmed introduced several new taxes, including an agricultural income tax, taxes on amusements and betting and a tax on sale of goods in an effort to eliminate the state's revenue deficit. The tax on agricultural income imposed a levy on the profits of the tea industry, a part of which was to be used for the welfare of workers in the tea plantations. This, and the pro-labour stance he took during the strike in the Assam Oil Company, was deemed inimical to British commercial interests in Assam but won much public support for the Bordoloi Ministry.

At the outbreak of the Second World War, Congress governments across India resigned in protest against Viceroy Lord Linlithgow's action of declaring India a belligerent without consulting them. In 1940, Ahmed was arrested and imprisoned for a year when he performed a satyagraha on Gandhi's behest. After the launch of the Quit India Movement, Ahmed was arrested on 9 August 1942, along with several other leaders of the Assam Provincial Congress Committee. He was detained as a prisoner for a further three years at the jail in Jorhat.

Ahmed was opposed to the Muslim League's demand for the creation of Pakistan and to the Partition of India along communal lines. However, in the elections of 1946, while the Congress won the majority of seats to form a government in Assam under Gopinath Bordoloi, Ahmed was defeated in the North Kamrup constituency by the Muslim League's Moulvi Abdul Hye. Although the Congress Party under Gopinath Bordoloi spent much money and effort in order to try and secure victory for Ahmed, he won only 844 votes against the 7,265 votes polled by Hye. Ahmed was thereafter appointed the Advocate General of Assam, a post he held until 1952.

== Career in independent India ==
Although he was offered a seat in the legislative assembly elections of 1952, Ahmed refused to contest the elections due to disagreements with the leadership of the Congress and the Chief Minister Bishnuram Medhi. In April 1954, he was elected to the Rajya Sabha and was a member until he resigned in March 1957. He contested and won the 1957 Assam Legislative Assembly election from Jania, winning 66.13% of the votes cast, and was re-elected to the seat in the 1962 Assam Legislative Assembly election; he improved his majority, winning 84.56% of the votes. Under the governments headed by Chief Minister Bimala Prasad Chaliha, Ahmed served as Minister of Finance, Law, Community Development, Panchayats and Local Self Government during 1957-1962 and was the Minister of Finance, Law, Community Development and Panchayats during 1962–66.

Ahmed facilitated the entry of Muhammed Saadulah, the Muslim League leader who preceded Gopinath Bordoloi as Assam's Prime Minister, into the Congress Party in 1951. Ahmed played a role in frustrating Chief Minister Chaliha's attempts at enforcing the Prevention of Infiltrators Plan which, based on the National Register of Citizens, 1951, sought to identify and deport illegal migrants to Assam. He argued that if the Congress Party were to continue with this plan, it would lead to its loss of support among Muslims in Assam and across the rest of India. He has been accused of thus allowing the steady influx of Muslims from East Pakistan who became a votebank for the Congress Party. Salman Khurshid has identified this strategy, which he attributes to Ahmed, as one of the factors that led to the Nellie Massacre.

== Union Minister ==
=== Minister of Irrigation and Power ===
In January 1966, while serving as Assam's Finance Minister, Ahmed was appointed the Union Minister for Irrigation and Power in Indira Gandhi's first cabinet. He was one of a handful of ministers she brought to Shastri's cabinet, which initially remained largely unchanged under her leadership. In April of that year, he was elected to the Rajya Sabha for a second time.

=== Minister of Education ===
Ahmed was shifted to the Ministry of Education, succeeding M.C. Chagla, and served as the Union Minister for Education between 13 November 1966 and 12 March 1967. In his brief period in that Ministry, Ahmed voiced concerns over the reduced allocations made to the Ministry and its likely impacts on educational reconstruction programs and oversaw the Amending Bill of 1966 to the Banaras Hindu University Act.

=== Minister of Industrial Development and Company Affairs ===
Ahmed was made the Minister of Industrial Development and Company Affairs on 13 March 1967. In the parliamentary elections of 1967, Ahmed was elected to the Lok Sabha from the Barpeta constituency in Assam, winning over 60% of the votes. During Ahmed's tenure as Minister of Industrial Development, his ministry, through the Directorate General of Technical Development, issued a letter of intent to Sanjay Gandhi to manufacture 50,000 Maruti cars annually, even though Gandhi lacked the technical expertise and the capital required for establishing such a venture.

In 1969, Ahmed introduced a bill in Parliament seeking to ban corporate funding to political parties. The bill, which sought to amend the Companies Act, 1956, aimed to curb the influence of large businesses on the political establishment. It also aimed to hamstring the centre-right Swatantra Party by preventing its access to funding. The ban, introduced without establishing an alternative financing mechanism, resulted in the abolishment of a key legal source of election funds for parties and a subsequent proliferation of illegal practices in campaign funding.

In September 1969, Ahmed was sent to Rabat, Morocco as head of the Indian delegation at the Islamic Summit held there. However, upon his arrival in Morocco the Indian delegation was barred from attending the summit on the objections of the Pakistani delegation led by General Ayub Khan. The incident proved to be a diplomatic fiasco for India and led to a vote of censure in Parliament. The censure was defeated by the Government with the help of the communist and regional parties, as the Congress Party's own strength in Parliament had reduced following an August split in the party. (Note: The Summit, held at Rabat from 22–24 September 1969, was convened in response to an arson attack at the Al-Aqsa Mosque in Jerusalem by an Australian national on 21 August 1969. Although the criteria for invitation to the summit, i.e., having a Muslim majority population or a Muslim head of state, were not met by India, a unanimous invitation was extended to the Government of India to send an official delegation at the inaugural plenary session on 23 September. India was represented by its Ambassador to Morocco pending the arrival of the official delegation. The next day, after the Indian delegation led by Ahmed had arrived, it was informed that news of the Ahmedabad riots had caused consternation among the attendees and had led to objections to India's participation from the Pakistani delegation which threatened to boycott proceedings if India were allowed to attend. It was therefore suggested that India either attend the conference as an observer or voluntarily withdraw from it. Both these suggestions were rejected by the Indian delegation. Pakistan's stonewalling has been attributed to protests that broke out in that country when news of India's participation became known and political opposition which threatened to jeopardize Ayub Khan's continuation in power. The Rabat Declaration referred to the Indian delegation as representatives of the Muslim community of India and omitted any reference to the Government of India. In retaliation to the treatment meted out to it, the Government of India recalled its ambassador to Morocco and its Charge d'affaires in Jordan and the External Affairs Minister, Dinesh Singh, met the Israeli Foreign Minister, Abba Eban, in New York in the first such high level meeting between India and Israel in many years. The Summit led to the formation of the Organization of Islamic Cooperation.)

=== Minister for Food and Agriculture ===
Ahmed was appointed Minister for Food and Agriculture on 27 June 1970, serving in that office until 3 July 1974. He was re-elected from Barpeta in the general election of 1971, winning over 72% of the votes polled. In May 1971, he was also made the minister in charge of wakf under the Muslim Wakfs Act, 1954. In 1971 the Central Land Reforms Committee was constituted, with Ahmed as its chairman, with the aim of helping the state governments undertake comprehensive land reform. The recommendations of the committee included fixing land ceilings at the level of the family, restrictively defining the family to include only a husband, wife and their minor children, and fixing ceilings between 10 and 18 acres of land for different types of land. Its recommendations paved the way for introduction of agricultural land ceilings in state legislations. 2.7 million hectares of excess land holdings were discovered, of which 53% was subsequently redistributed among people from the Scheduled Castes and Scheduled Tribes.

As minister, Ahmed supported the creation of food and fertilizer buffer stocks to meet shortfalls in production. The nationalization of the wholesale trade in wheat by the government of India was implemented under Ahmed in 1973. Although it was aimed at preventing market distortions and ensuring stability of prices, the policy proved disastrous, leading to lower procurements and the running down of buffer stocks, and eventually forcing the import of over 60 lakh tonnes of grain at high prices. Consequently, proposals to extend nationalization to the trade in rice and for the wheat crop of April 1974 were abandoned.

== President of India (1974–1977) ==
=== Election as president ===
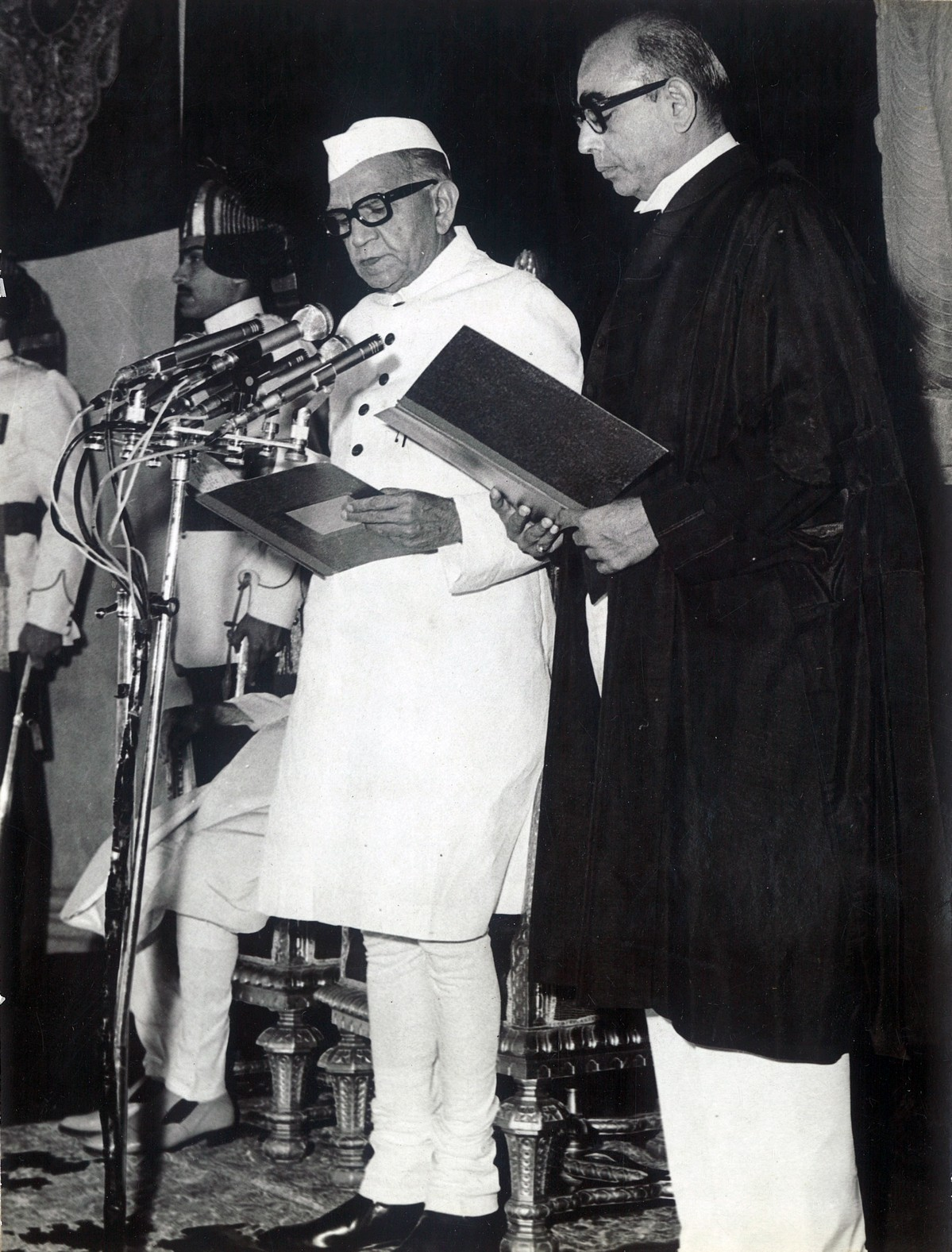
President Ahmed being administered the oath of office by Chief Justice A. N. Ray.

In July 1974, Ahmed was chosen by Indira Gandhi and the Congress Party as their candidate to be the next President of India. In doing so, they overlooked the then Vice President, Gopal Swarup Pathak, who had been elected to that post in 1969 with the support of the Congress Party. Polling for the 1974 Indian presidential election was held on 17 August in a direct contest between the Congress Party's Ahmed and the opposition candidate Tridib Chaudhuri, a Lok Sabha MP from the Revolutionary Socialist Party. Chaudhuri was supported by most of the opposition parties. Ahmed won 765,587 votes (or 80.18% of the 954,783 votes cast) against Chaudhuri's 189,196 and he was declared elected on 20 August.

Ahmed was sworn in as the fifth president of India on 24 August 1974, becoming the second Muslim to hold that office and the first person to be directly elevated to the presidency from the Union Cabinet. He was also the first president to be elected after the amendments to the Presidential and Vice-Presidential Elections Act, 1952 that imposed a security deposit of ₹2,500 (US$26) and made it mandatory for every candidate in a presidential election to be supported by ten proposing and ten seconding legislators. Ahmed's election was challenged unsuccessfully before India's Supreme Court by Charu Lal Sahu, an advocate-on-record.

=== Promulgation of the Emergency ===
Ahmed imposed a national emergency under Article 352 of India's Constitution late in the night of 25 June 1975 on the advice of Prime Minister Indira Gandhi. The legality of its imposition – on the ground that "a grave emergency exists whereby the security of India is threatened by internal disturbances." – was dubious, as there were no reports to that effect from the Intelligence Bureau, the Home Ministry or from any or the governors of the states, nor had the proposal been considered by the Union Council of Ministers. Although the constitutional impropriety was pointed out to him, Ahmed raised no questions and chose to sign the order imposing the emergency, a draft of which was brought to him by the Prime Minister's personal secretary, R. K. Dhawan. (Note: As it originally stood, Article 352 of the Indian Constitution empowered the President to impose a national Emergency on his satisfaction that the security of India or any part of it is threatened by war, external aggression or internal disturbance. Article 74 of the Constitution as it then stood, provided for "a Council of Ministers with the Prime Minister at the head to aid and advise the President". In this case, the Union Council of Ministers had not met and advised the proclamation of Emergency to the President. The expression "internal disturbance" was changed to "armed rebellion" by the forty-fourth Constitutional Amendment Act which also added in Section 74 that the President "may require the Council of Ministers to reconsider such advice, either generally or otherwise, and the President shall act in accordance with the advice tendered after such reconsideration.")

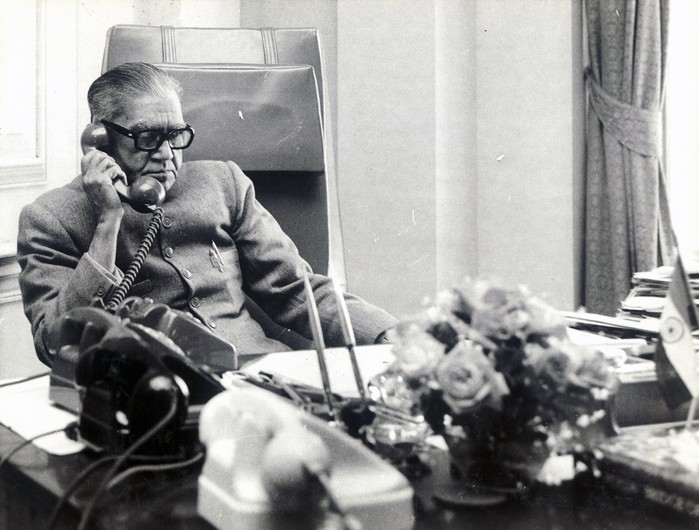
Fakhruddin Ali Ahmed in his study, Rashtrapati Bhavan

In the early hours of the next day, electricity supply was cut off to newspaper offices in Delhi and the main leaders of opposition parties placed under arrest. The Cabinet met at 7AM on 26 June, where it was informed by the prime minister of the imposition of emergency the previous night. Prime Minister Gandhi subsequently addressed the nation on All India Radio announcing the Emergency, beginning with the words "The President has proclaimed an emergency. This is nothing to panic about." The Emergency, which lasted until 21 March 1977, saw the suppression of civil liberties, the arrest of opposition politicians and clampdown on political parties, the suspension of fundamental rights guaranteed by the Indian Constitution and the muzzling of the media. It has been described as a period of darkness for India's democracy.

=== Ordinances and Constitutional Amendments ===
The two-thirds majority enjoyed by the Congress Party in India's Parliament allowed it to undertake several wide-ranging constitutional amendments. The Prime Minister also instructed Ahmed to issue ordinances, sidestepping Parliament and allowing for rule by decree. (Note: As per Article 123 of the Indian Constitution, the President of India can issue ordinances when Parliament is not in session if he is satisfied that circumstances exist which require immediate action to be taken. An ordinance so issued must be approved by Parliament within six weeks of its reassembling failing which it ceases to operate. Analogous constitutional provisions exist for governors of states and Administrators of Union Territories having legislatures. By the 38th Constitutional Amendment Act, which received President Ahmed's assent, the President's satisfaction regarding the exigent circumstances warranting the issue of ordinance was made non-justiciable thus taking it out of the purview of judicial review. The 44th Constitutional Amendment revoked this change.) In August 1975, the thirty-eighth and thirty-ninth Constitutional Amendment Bills passed by Parliament received presidential assent. The 38th Amendment precluded the Emergency and the ordinances passed during this period from judicial review, while the 39th Amendment barred the courts from adjudicating election petitions filed against the president, the vice president, the prime minister and the speaker of the Lok Sabha and rendered any pending proceedings before the courts null and void.

Ordinances issued in 1975 included one abolishing bonded labour, the Equal Remuneration Ordinance which provided for equal pay for equal work or work of similar nature, the amendment to the Conservation of Foreign Exchange and Prevention of Smuggling Activities Act, 1974 allowing detention of offenders for a period of two years, and an amendment to the Import and Export (Controls) Act increasing the severity of penalties for offences relating to the misuse of import licences and imported goods among scores of other ordinances issued during the year. In December 1975, while President Ahmed was on a state visit to Egypt and Sudan, the government dispatched a special courier carrying three executive ordinances preventing the publication of material deemed objectionable by the government, abolishing the Press Council of India and lifting immunities on media's coverage of Parliament. These were promptly signed in Cairo by the President. The first session of Parliament in 1976 therefore had to consider and replace with acts the numerous ordinances issued since the proclamation of Emergency in June 1975.

In January 1976, President's rule was declared in Tamil Nadu after Ahmed dismissed its government, headed by Chief Minister M. Karunanidhi, and dissolved the state's legislative assembly. By two ordinances issued in March 1976, the responsibility of maintaining government accounts were taken away from the Comptroller and Auditor General of India and vested with the accounts offices of individual government departments, while making the Comptroller and Auditor General responsible for the audit of these accounts. In June 1976, an ordinance extended by a year the validity of provisions allowing the government to detain any person for up to one year without disclosing the grounds for detention to the detainee under the Maintenance of Internal Security Act. In December 1976, the Forty-second Constitutional Amendment Bill received President Ahmed's assent. The bill, passed by both houses of Parliament in November, amended as many as 59 articles of the Constitution and the Preamble, besides introducing a new section containing the Fundamental Duties of citizens. Furthermore, it sought to severely circumscribe the powers of the Supreme Court, transferred several responsibilities hitherto entrusted with the state governments to the Central government, and extended the tenure of the Lok Sabha to six years.

=== Support for the Emergency ===
As president, Ahmed publicly spoke in favour of the imposition of Emergency throughout this period. In his address to the nation on Independence Day, 1975 he assured citizens that the Emergency was a "passing phase" and its imposition was necessary to save India from chaos and disruption. He also cautioned that liberty should not "degenerate into licence" and exhorted the nation to focus on increasing production. Elsewhere, he reiterated that the "Emergency is a passing phase but the era of permissive politics and national degeneration is over and we will never allow that phase to be repeated again" and that the indiscipline and disorder brought about by reactionary forces had slowed down India's development. Addressing the nation on Republic Day, 1976, Ahmed said that the Emergency had helped India's economy and brought about "national discipline at all levels". On the Independence Day in 1976, he stated that the Emergency would not be used to switch over from the parliamentary to a presidential system of government or to accumulate more power than was permitted under the Constitution and that it had been issued instead "to bring about such economic, social and political changes as have become relevant and necessary in the interests of the people of India".

In private, Ahmed appeared to have misgivings about the Emergency. This was revealed in an embassy cable sent from the United States Embassy in Delhi in August 1976 which suggested an estrangement between Ahmed and Prime Minister Indira Gandhi. The cable noted Ahmed's growing concern that Indira and Sanjay Gandhi were "pushing too hard on the political and Constitutional system of India" and reported that he had rebuffed her suggestion to replace the vice-president, B.D. Jatti with her former defence minister, Swaran Singh. Indira Gandhi's proposal to replace her entire cabinet with younger ministers was also cautioned against by Ahmed, who warned her that this would jeopardize the unity of the Congress Party. The cable went on to note that Ahmed was "uncomfortable with some of Mrs. Gandhi's actions and certainly with those of her son" and that Indira Gandhi had apologized to Ahmed on behalf of Sanjay Gandhi for his rude remarks when the President declined to give a statement for the inaugural issue of the younger Gandhi's magazine, Surya.

=== Abu Abraham's cartoon and the rubber stamp presidency ===
On 10 December 1975, a cartoon by Abu Abraham, which escaped the notice of the government censors, appeared in the Indian Express. The cartoon showed Ahmed, semi-naked and in a bathtub filled to its brim, handing over a paper he has signed to an outstretched hand of a person clothed in a formal suit and shirt. The speech balloon reads: "If there are any more ordinances, just ask them to wait." The cartoon, which lampooned Ahmed's pliability in signing ordinances put before him, became an iconic image of the Emergency. The cartoon irreparably damaged Ahmed's image and legacy, and he is widely regarded as a rubber stamp President, who was willing to sign ordinances and the proclamation of Emergency put to him without questioning the government or asking it to be reconsidered. Subsequent Presidents of India who have been thought of as pliant and meekly submitting to the government of the day have been compared to Ahmed's rubber stamp presidency.

=== State visits ===
President Ahmed made state visits to Indonesia, Hungary, Yugoslavia, Egypt, Sudan, Iran and Malaysia during his term in office. His visit to Saudi Arabia in March 1975 to attend the funeral of King Faisal was the first time an Indian President was personally present at the funeral of another head of state and the first visit to Saudi Arabia by a senior Indian leader after Jawaharlal Nehru's visit in 1956. He was conferred with an honorary degree of Doctor of Law by the University of Pristina, Kosovo during his visit to Yugoslavia. During his state visit to Sudan in December 1975, Ahmed visited Juba in South Sudan, where he addressed the Regional Peoples' Assembly, in one of the earliest visits by an Indian dignitary to South Sudan.

=== Interest in sports ===
Ahmed was a keen sportsman throughout his life and was an active golfer during his presidency. He was a centre-half in field hockey and played for the Combined Universities Hockey Team in Cambridge. For many years he was president of Assam's State Football and Cricket Associations. He served as the vice-chairman of the Assam Council of Sports and was later President of the All-India Lawn Tennis Federation. Ahmed is credited with reviving the Shillong Golf Club and resurrecting the mini golf course at the Rashtrapati Bhavan. Ahmed introduced the President's Polo Cup as an open tournament in 1975, when he was the patron-in-chief of the Indian Polo Association. Temporarily discontinued in 2005, it has been held since 2013 as the President's Polo Cup Exhibition Match.

== Death and burial ==
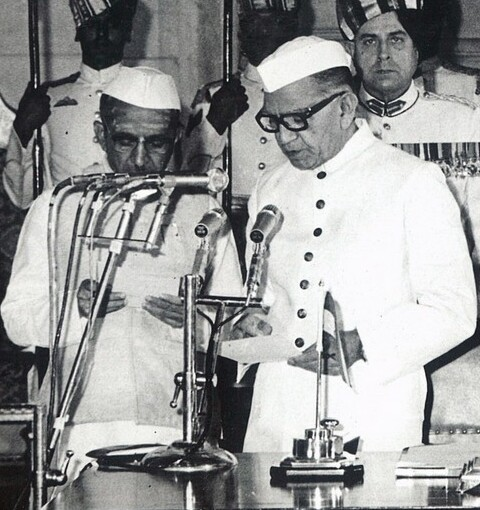
President Ahmed administering the oath of office of the Vice President of India to B.D. Jatti on August 31, 1974. Jatti served as acting president after Ahmed's death.

On 10 February 1977, Ahmed, who was on a three nation visit to Malaysia, Philippines and Burma, flew back to New Delhi from Kuala Lumpur. He had been forced to curtail his official engagements in Malaysia due to ill health and was reportedly too weak to attend a guard of honour arranged for him at the Kuala Lumpur airport. In the morning of 11 February, Ahmed, who had previously suffered heart attacks in 1966 and 1970 and whose health was described as being uncertain, was found lying unconscious in his bath in the Rashtrapati Bhavan. He was attended to by doctors but was declared dead at 8:52 a.m. having succumbed to a heart attack. He was India's second president to die in office. Vice President B. D. Jatti was sworn in as the acting president within a few hours and thirteen days of national mourning were declared, with flags flying at half-mast.

Ahmed's body lay in state in the Durbar Hall of the Rashtrapati Bhavan where common citizens, politicians, ministers and constitutional functionaries from various parties paid their respects to him. He was accorded a state funeral and buried in the grounds of the Jama Masjid near Parliament House on 13 February. Among the foreign dignitaries who attended his funeral were Lillian Carter, the mother of President Jimmy Carter, Prince Michael of Kent and Mikhail Georgadze, representing the Soviet Union.

Ahmed's death came amidst the campaigning for the general elections of 1977. They had been announced after Ahmed, on the advice of Prime Minister Indira Gandhi, had dissolved Parliament in January. In his address to the nation on Republic Day, 1977 Ahmed had called for an election campaign free of bitterness and rancor. Although his death brought a lull to the campaign, it was decided that the polls would be held in March 1977 as planned.

=== Tomb ===
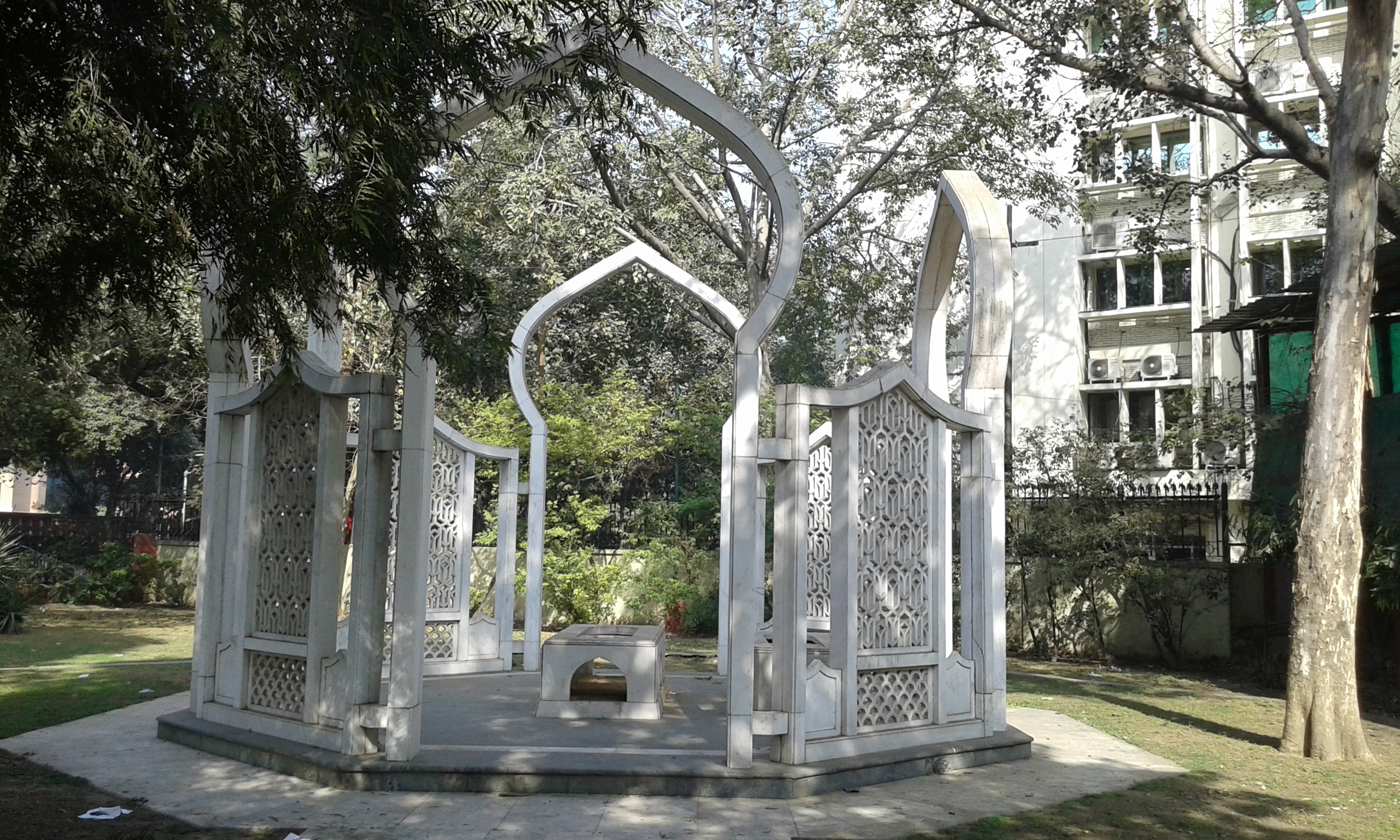
Grave of Ahmed

Ahmed's tomb was designed by the architect Habib Rahman. Rahman was also the architect of the tomb for Zakir Hussain, who was the first Muslim and the first President to die in office. The tomb is open to the sky and features thin framed marble jalis which are clamped with the help of internal pins onto structural elements made of steel. The tomb is a post-modern interpretation of traditional Islamic forms, and an abstraction of the silhouette of the Taj Mahal. Its openness makes it an "austere" and "elegant" building and one of Delhi's most remarkable pieces of modern architectural heritage, in the view of some critics.

== Family ==
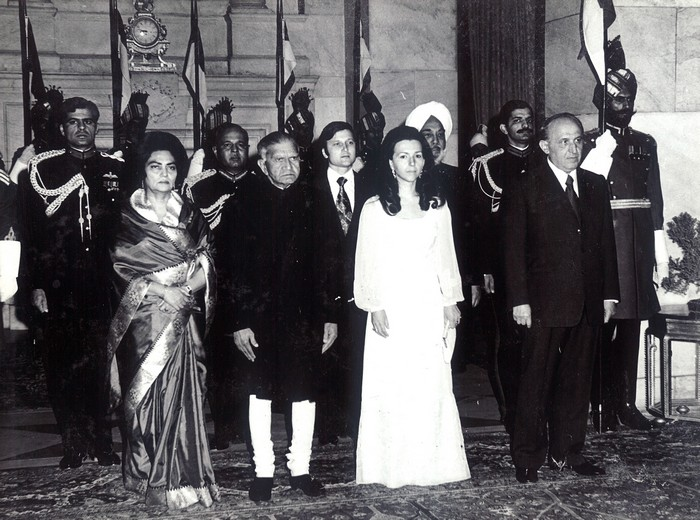
From left to right are the First Lady Abida Ahmed, President Ahmed, Lyudmila Zhivkova, and Todor Zhivkov, the President of Bulgaria.

Ahmed was married to Abida Ahmed and had two sons and a daughter with her. Abida Ahmed is credited with having overhauled the presidential kitchen and ensuring Awadhi cuisine was included in its repertoire, as well as redecorating the rooms and upholstery of the Rashtrapati Bhavan. In the 1980s, she went on to become a two-term MP of the Indian National Congress from Bareilly, Uttar Pradesh. The elder of their sons, Parvez Ahmed, is a doctor who contested the General Elections of 2014 from Barpeta as a candidate of the Trinamool Congress party. Their other son, Badar Durrez Ahmed, served as a judge of the Delhi High Court and retired as Chief Justice of the Jammu and Kashmir High Court.

== Awards and honours ==
- Bangladesh:
  - Bangladesh Liberation War Honour (2013, posthumous)

== Commemoration ==
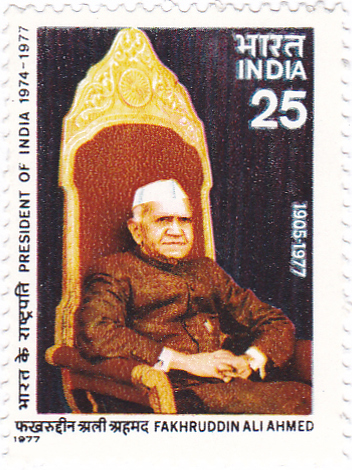
Commemorative stamp issued by India Post featuring Ahmed

Salute To The President Fakhruddin Ali Ahmed is a 1977 short documentary film directed by J. S. Bandekar and produced by the Films Division of India on the life and career of Ahmed. A commemorative postage stamp was issued by India Post in 1977. The Fakhruddin Ali Ahmed Committee, which works to promote Urdu, Arabic and Persian languages. The Fakhruddin Ali Ahmed Teachers Training College in Darbhanga, Bihar was also named after the former president.

The Indian Council of Agricultural Research has since 1977 given out the Fakhruddin Ali Ahmed Award for scientists doing research in tribal and remote areas. The award carries a citation and a purse of ₹2 lakh (US$2,100).

== See also ==
- List of heads of state and government who died in office
- List of presidents of India

== Notes ==
Political offices
Preceded by Kanuri Lakshmana Rao	Minister of Irrigation and Power; 1966	Succeeded by Kanuri Lakshmana Rao
Preceded by M. C. Chagla	Minister of Education; 1966–1967	Succeeded by Triguna Sen
Preceded by Damodaram Sanjivayya	Minister of Industrial Development, Internal Trade and Company Affairs; 1967–1970	Succeeded by Dinesh Singh
Preceded by Jagjivan Ram	Minister of Food and Agriculture; 1970–1974	Succeeded by Chidambaram Subramaniam
Preceded by Varahagiri Venkata Giri	President of India; 1974–1977	Succeeded by Basappa Danappa Jatti; Acting
Lok Sabha
Preceded by Renuka Devi Barkataki	Member of Parliament for Barpeta; 1967–1974	Succeeded by Ismail Hossain Khan
