= Abida Ahmed =

Indian politician

Begum Abida Ahmed
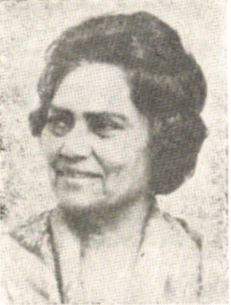

First Lady of India
- In role 24 August 1974 – 11 February 1977
- President: Fakhruddin Ali Ahmed
- Prime Minister: Indira Gandhi
- Vice President: Gopal Swarup Pathak; B.D. Jatti
- Preceded by: Saraswati Bai
- Succeeded by: Sangamma Jatti (Interim); Neelam Nagaratnamma Reddy

Member of Parliament, Lok Sabha
- In office 1981–1989
- Preceded by: Misaryar Khan
- Succeeded by: Santosh Gangwar
- Constituency: Bareilly

Personal details
- Born: 17 July 1923 Badaun district, United Provinces, British India
- Died: 7 December 2003 (aged 80) New Delhi, India
- Party: Indian National Congress
- Spouse: Fakhruddin Ali Ahmed (m. 1945; died 1977)
- Children: 3
- Education: Aligarh Muslim University

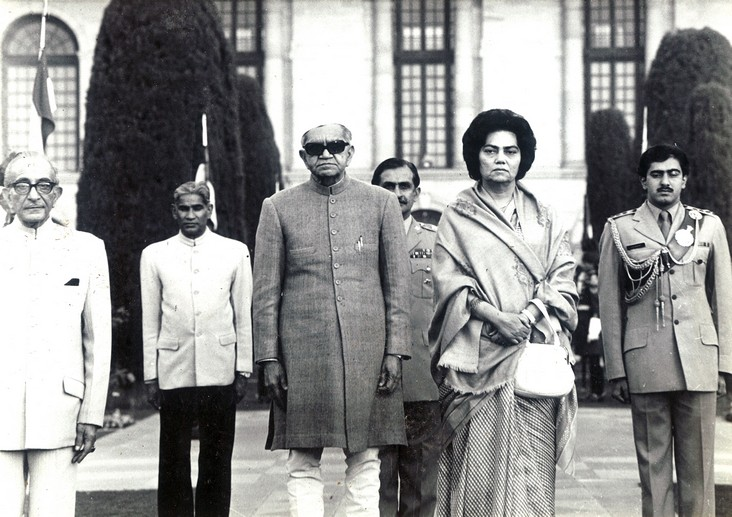
President Fakhruddin Ali Ahmed and First Lady Abida Ahmed

Begum Abida Ahmed (17 July 1923 – 7 December 2003) was an Indian politician, artist, and social activist, notable for her role as the First Lady of India from 1974 to 1977, as the wife of Fakhruddin Ali Ahmed, the fifth President of India. She was later a Member of Parliament in the Lok Sabha, representing the Bareilly parliamentary constituency of Uttar Pradesh.

== Early life ==
Abida Ahmed was born on 17 July 1923 in Sheikhupur, Badaun, Uttar Pradesh. She grew up in a politically engaged environment, which shaped her future interests in public service and activism.

She pursued her education at the Women's College, Aligarh and the Aligarh Muslim University, Aligarh. There she excelled academically and demonstrated an interest in national and international affairs. Her early exposure to politics and social issues inspired her to pursue a career in public life.

She married her husband Fakhruddin Ali Ahmed on 9 November 1945. Their marriage was arranged while Ali Ahmed was in prison and Abida Ahmed in college.

In 1957 Abida Ahmed travelled with her husband and relocated to New York City as part of her husband's assignment to the United Nations. She also accompanied Pat Nixon while she and her husband were on a state visit to India.

== Career ==
=== First Lady of India ===
Abida Ahmed is credited with having overhauled the presidential kitchen and ensuring Awadhi cuisine was included in its repertoire. Additionally she worked at redecorating the rooms and upholstery of the Rashtrapati Bhavan and aided in designing the surrounding landscaping. She also organized events and gatherings involving the Rashtrapati Bhavan. Her husband died while in office in 1977 marking the end of her role as first lady.

=== Member of Parliament ===
In 1979 while attempting to file her paperwork for the 1980 election Ahmed was stopped by protesters surrounding her home in an attempt to prevent her and other women from filing election paperwork. As the police attempted to break up the protest two people died. Her paperwork was later smuggled out of her home by one of her supporters with a police escort.

In 1980, she was elected to the 7th Lok Sabha, serving Bareilly, Uttar Pradesh as a member of the Indian National Congress. She was re-elected in 1984 to the 8th Lok Sabha. In 1986 she spoke out against a bill giving women who divorce their husbands alimony.

- She founded the society named "God's Grace" which was registered with the Registrar of Societies under the Indian Societies Registration Act.
- She was member of India Islamic Cultural Centre (IICC).
- She formed Humsub Drama Group in 1974 for Urdu theatre.

She later served as the president of the Mahila Congress from 1983 until 1988.

== Personal life ==
Abida and Fakhruddin had two sons and a daughter. The elder of their sons, Parvez Ahmed, is a doctor who contested the General Elections of 2014 in the Barpeta constituency as a candidate of the Trinamool Congress party. Their other son, Badar Durrez Ahmed, served as a judge of the Delhi High Court and retired as Chief Justice of the Jammu and Kashmir High Court. Abida was a badminton player and led the Assam team in the 1958 national championships.

== See also ==
- First ladies and gentlemen of India
