= Vimala Sharma =

Former First Lady of India

First Lady of India
- In role 25 July 1992 – 25 July 1997
- President: Shankar Dayal Sharma
- Preceded by: Janaki Venkataraman
- Succeeded by: Usha Narayanan

Second Lady of India
- In role 3 September 1987 – 24 July 1992
- Vice President: Shankar Dayal Sharma
- Preceded by: Janaki Venkataraman
- Succeeded by: Usha Narayanan

First Lady of Maharashtra
- In office 3 April 1986 – 2 September 1987
- Governor: Shankar Dayal Sharma
- Preceded by: Padmavathi Rao
- Succeeded by: Raghavamma Reddy

First Lady of Punjab
- In office 26 November 1985 – 2 April 1986
- Governor: Shankar Dayal Sharma
- Preceded by: Saroj Kumari
- Succeeded by: Maya Ray

First Lady of United Andhra Pradesh
- In office 29 August 1984 – 26 November 1985
- Governor: Shankar Dayal Sharma
- Preceded by: Elizabeth Abraham
- Succeeded by: Suman Kant

Personal details
- Born: c. 1926–1927 Udaipura, Central Provinces, India
- Died: 15 August 2020 (aged 93) Bhopal, Madhya Pradesh, India
- Party: Indian National Congress
- Spouse: Shankar Dayal Sharma (m. 1950; died 1999)

Vimala Devi Sharma (c. 1927 – 15 August 2020) was an Indian social worker, women's rights activist, and politician who served as the First Lady of India from 1992 to 1997 and the Second Lady of India & as First Lady of 3 of the Indian states of Maharashtra, Andhra Pradesh and Punjab during the governorship of her husband, the late President Shankar Dayal Sharma.

Sharma died, at age 93, in August 2020 while recovering from COVID-19.

== Early life ==
Vimala Sharma was originally from Rajasthan and spent most of her early life in Jaipur. She married Shankar Dayal Sharma, who later became President of India from 1992 to 1997.

She was a social worker by profession. She headed the Madhya Pradesh Social Welfare Board, which oversees social services in the state, for several terms. In 1985, she was elected to the Madhya Pradesh Legislative Assembly, representing Udaipura, as a member of the Indian National Congress party. She became the first female MLA to hold the Udaipura seat in its history. Her husband, Shankar Dayal Sharma, was also elected as the first MLA from the same Udaipura seat upon the district's creation in 1962. She declined to seek re-election to the Madhya Pradesh Legislative Assembly after her husband became Vice President of India.

Towards the end of his presidency, Vimala and Shankar Dayal Sharma, who lived in Bhopal, began to discuss where they would live after his retirement from office. She advocated for a move to her hometown on Jaipur, which had better hospitals and medical facilities than Bhopal, as her husband was in declining health at the time. However, the couple ultimately chose to retire to a home in Delhi. Shankar Dayal Sharma died on 26 December 1999, just 2 years after leaving office.

She remained highly involved in social and charitable organisations throughout her later life, especially in the Bhopal and Raisen districts, according to Madhya Pradesh Chief Minister Shivraj Singh Chouhan.

== First Lady of Andhra Pradesh (1984–1985) ==
Sharma served as the First Lady of the State of Andhra Pradesh during the tenure of her husband as the Governor of the state.

== First Lady of Punjab (1985–1986) ==
Sharma served as the First Lady of the State of Punjab during the tenure of her husband as the Governor of the state.

== First Lady of Maharashtra (1986–1987) ==
Sharma served as the First Lady of the State of Maharashtra during the tenure of her husband as the Governor.

== Second Lady of India (1987–1992) ==
Sharma succeeded the Office of Second Lady of India immediately after the office of the Governor Spouse for full fledged 5 year term.

== First Lady of India (1992–1997) ==
Sharma succeeded as the First Lady of India during the tenure of her husband Shankar Dayal Sharma as the President. Much of her work focused on women's rights.

== Death ==
In June 2020, Sharma developed breathing difficulties, a symptom of COVID-19. She exhibited low oxygen levels on 5 June and tested positive for COVID-19 on 6 June 2020. Sharma was immediately admitted to the AIIMS Trauma Centre in New Delhi, where she was treated for COVID-19 for 18 days. Her condition continued to deteriorate for the first four days of her hospitalisation before she began to show some improvement to her health. Sharma received high flow oxygen through a nasal cannula and was given antibiotics, but was not placed on a ventilator. She was discharged from AIIMS Hospital on 25 June 2020, but still required 2-3 litres of nasal oxygen per hour during her recovery. Vimala Sharma, who was 93-years old at the time of her diagnosis and hospitalisation, was one of the oldest coronavirus patients to be released from the hospital in Delhi during the pandemic, though she never completely recovered from the illness.

Vimala Sharma died in Bhopal on 15 August 2020, at the age of 93, less than 2 months after her hospitalisation for COVID-19. Indian President Ram Nath Kovind tweeted his condolences, writing, "Sad to hear about the demise of Mrs. Vimala Sharma, wife of former President Dr. Shankar Dayal Sharma. My condolences to his family and loved ones." Vice President Venkaiah Naidu and Chief Minister of Madhya Pradesh Shivraj Singh Chouhan also sent public condolences.
