= Suvra Mukherjee =

Indian politician

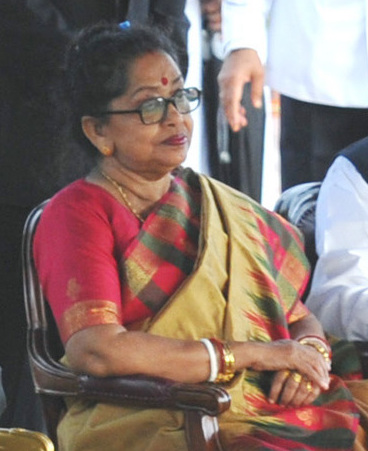
- Mukherjee during the "At home" ceremony, 2012

First Lady of India
- In role 25 July 2012 – 18 August 2015
- President: Pranab Mukherjee
- Preceded by: Devisingh Ransingh Shekhawat (as First Gentleman)
- Succeeded by: Savita Kovind (2017)

Personal details
- Born: 17 September 1940 Narail, Jessore District, Bengal, British India (Now, Narail, Bangladesh)
- Died: 18 August 2015 (aged 74) New Delhi, Delhi, India
- Spouse: Pranab Mukherjee (m. 1957–2015)
- Children: 3 (including Sharmistha Mukherjee and Abhijit Mukherjee)

Suvra Mukherjee (17 September 1940 – 18 August 2015) was the First Lady of India serving from the year 2012 until her death in 2015.

== Early and personal life ==
Mukherjee was born on 17 September 1940 to a Bengali Brahmin family in Jessore District of Bengal Presidency (now in Bangladesh ), and moved to Calcutta when she was 10 years old. She married Pranab Mukherjee on 13 July 1957 and the couple had two sons and a daughter. She held two master's degrees, in history and in political science and also taught history and English grammar during the early 1970s in West Midnapore.

Mukherjee, was an accomplished singer and a vocalist of songs composed by Rabindranath Tagore, which are known as Rabindra Sangeet. She performed in his dance-dramas for many years in India, Europe, Asia and Africa, as well as being the founder of the Geetanjali Troupe, whose mission is to disseminate Tagore's philosophy through song and dance. The group often rehearsed in her home on Talkatora Road. She passed on her love of classical dance to her daughter, Sharmistha Mukherjee, with whom she also occasionally performed. She was also a painter who participated in both group and solo exhibitions.

Mukherjee authored two books: Chokher Aloey is a personal account of her close interaction with Prime Minister Indira Gandhi, and Chena Achenai Chin is a travelogue recounting her visit to China. She also supported singer Kumar Sanu and released many of his musical albums related Rabindra Sangeet and religious music.

== Death ==
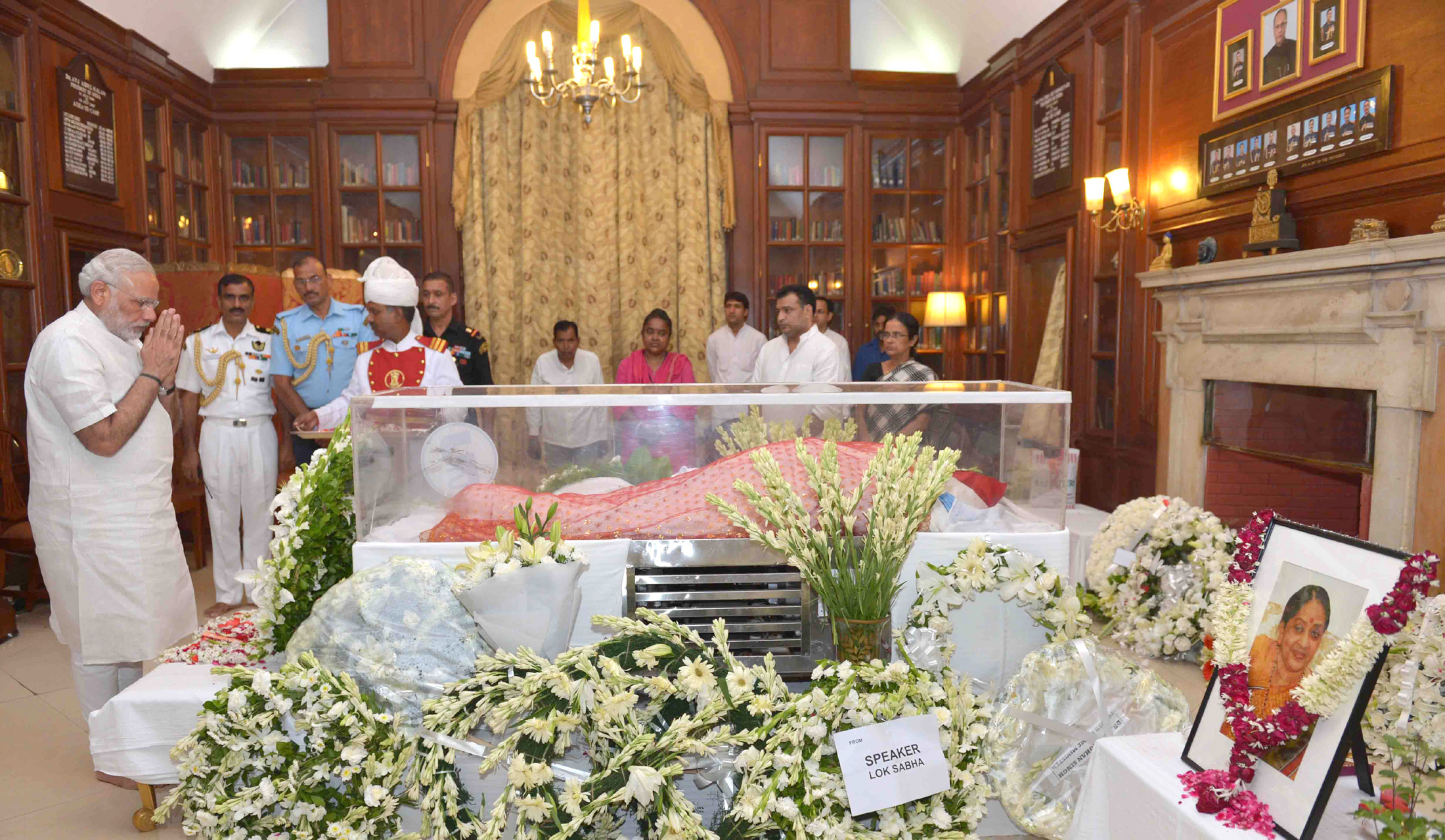
Prime Minister Narendra Modi paying homage to the remains of First Lady Suvra Mukherjee at the Rashtrapati Bhavan

Mukherjee died in a hospital in New Delhi, India, aged 74. She had respiratory problems and was treated as a heart patient.

Narendra Modi, the Prime Minister of India said: "... (she) will be remembered as a lover of art, culture and music. Her warm nature endeared her to everyone she met". Her friend, Sheikh Hasina, the Prime Minister of Bangladesh who attended the funeral stated: "Bangladesh has lost a great friend and well-wisher with her passing away".

== Bibliography ==
- Sabha, India Parliament Rajyya (2000). Who's who. Rajya Sabha Secretariat.

Honorary titles
Preceded by Devisingh Ransingh Shekhawat as First Gentleman of India	First Lady of India; 2012–2015	Vacant Title next held by Savita Kovind
