= Janaki Venkataraman =

Former First Lady of India

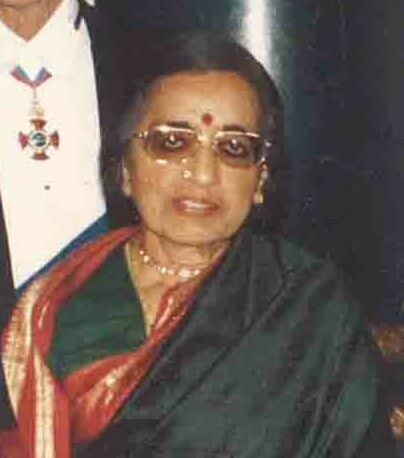

First Lady of India
- In role 25 July 1987 – 25 July 1992
- President: Ramaswamy Venkataraman
- Preceded by: Pardhan Kaur
- Succeeded by: Vimala Sharma

Second Lady of India
- In role 20 August 1982 – 27 July 1987
- Vice President: Ramaswamy Venkataraman
- Preceded by: Pushpa Shah
- Succeeded by: Vimala Sharma

Personal details
- Born: 1921 Pegu, Burma (now Myanmar)
- Died: 13 August 2010 (aged 88–89) New Delhi, India
- Spouse: Ramaswamy Venkataraman (m. 1938)
- Children: 3

Janaki Venkataraman (1921 – 13 August 2010) was an Indian activist. She served as the First Lady of India from 1987 until 1992, as the wife of President R. Venkataraman. She also served as the former Second Lady of India, during her husband's tenure as Vice President.

== Early life ==
Venkataraman was born in Pegu, Burma, to Tamil Iyer Burmese Indian parents, Kamala and Krishna Iyer. Her mother died when she was five and as her father did not remarry, she assisted with the household duties along with her siblings.

She was married to R. Venkataraman in 1938 and had three daughters. She was considered "deeply pious" in her Hinduism by Gopal Gandhi. After her marriage, her husband's political and unionist activities increased. To assist him, she became a partner in the Labor Law Journal which he had established.

== Human rights activist ==
Venkataraman was a human rights activist and led "hundreds of supporters" in protests about the war violence perpetrated upon women during the Bangladeshi War. She was an ardent feminist and supported women's self-reliance, as well as a humanitarian, working on projects for the poor.

In addition, she was an animal rights activist refusing to wear silk which required worms to be killed and instead popularized the wearing of Ahimsa silk, which does not require harming the cocoon. Her promotion of wearing saris created without harming the silkworms led to popularity of Ahimsa Silk (also called "mulberry silk") and inspired entrepreneurs to develop the technology further. In addition to obtaining a patent, the Andhra Pradesh State Handloom Weavers Co-operative Society began marketing its "vegan wild silk" products to high end fashion labels.

When a documentary about her husband's life was made and Janaki was included in only one frame, she requested removal of the image. She preferred to be "noticed in the absence than to be ignored as an insignificant presence."

== Second Lady of India (1984–1987) ==
As Second Lady (spouse of the Vice President), Venkataraman's role was largely supportive and ceremonial. She had accompanied her husband to official functions and events, representing the country alongside him. While she has no specific-official duties during this period.

== First Lady of India (1987–1992) ==
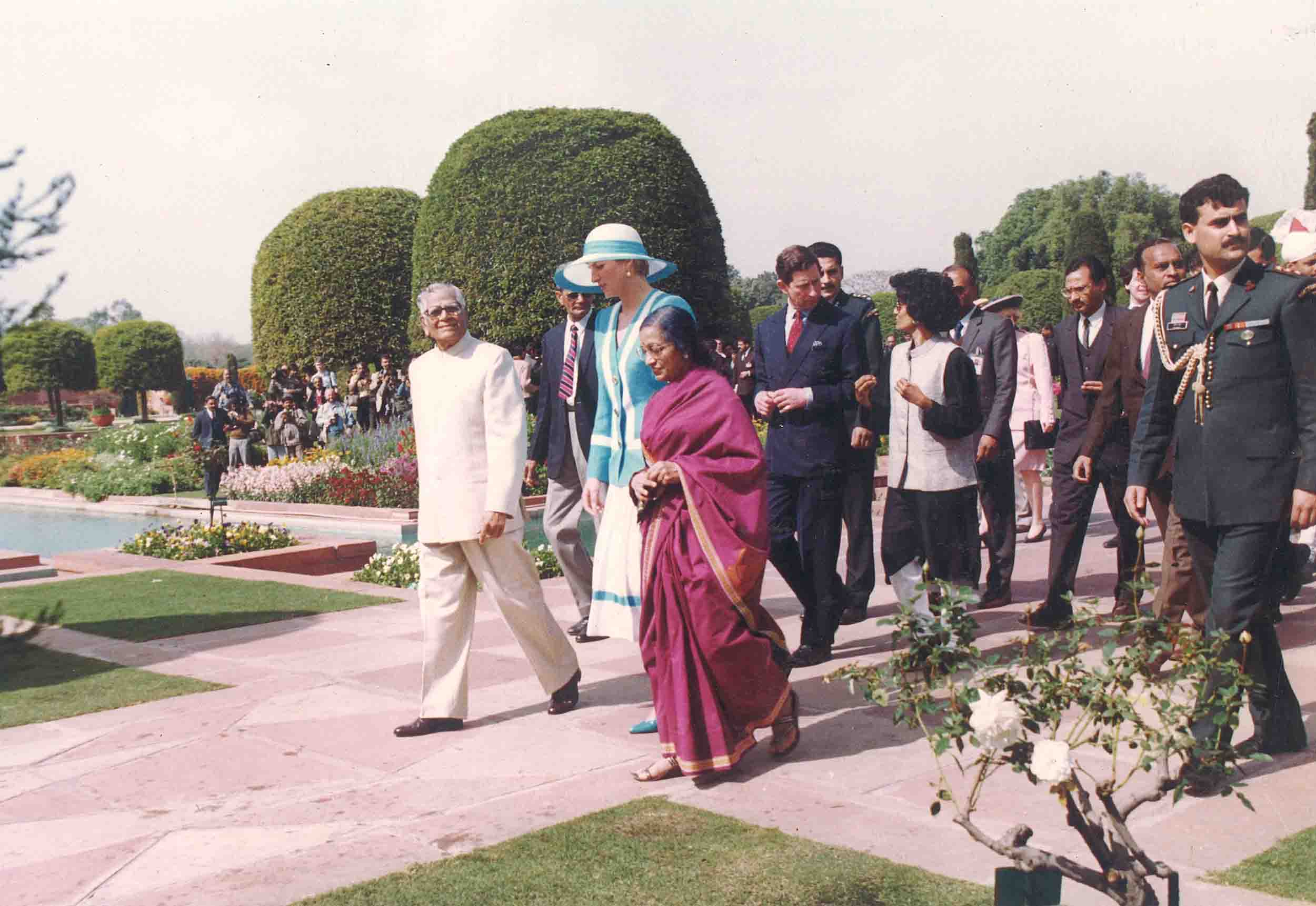
President R. Venkataraman and the First Lady Janaki Venkataraman with Diana, Princess of Wales and Charles, Prince of Wales at Amrit Udyan of Rashtrapati Bhavan.

She served as the First Lady of India from 1987 to 1992 during her husband R. Venkataraman's presidency. Although the role of First Lady in India is not officially defined and is largely ceremonial, Venkataraman used her position to promote causes she was passionate about. During her tenure, she was known for being an active First Lady, implementing social welfare programs that originated from the Rashtrapati Bhavan office. She often accompanied her husband on state visits and was seen as a public face of Indian womanhood. She was widely respected for her grace and dignity in performing her duties as First Lady. She chose to maintain a low profile, preferring to be "noticed in the absence than to be ignored as an insignificant presence."

== See also ==
- First ladies and gentlemen of India
