= Mrityunjay Prasad =

Indian politician (born 1906)

Member of Parliament, Lok Sabha
- In office 1967–1971
- Preceded by: Krishnakanta Singh
- Succeeded by: Ram Deo Singh
- Constituency: Maharajganj, Bihar
- In office 1977–1980
- Preceded by: Mohammad Yusuf
- Succeeded by: Mohammad Yusuf
- Constituency: Siwan, Bihar

Personal details
- Born: 2 January 1906 Jiradei, Bengal Presidency, British India
- Party: Janata Party (1967–1980)
- Other political affiliations: Indian National Congress (till 1967)
- Children: Tara Sinha (Daughter)
- Parent(s): Rajendra Prasad (father); Rajvanshi Devi (mother)

Mrityunjaya Prasad (2 January 1906-19 October 1984) was an Indian politician and son of Rajendra Prasad and Rajvanshi Devi who served as Member of 6th Lok Sabha from Siwan Lok Sabha constituency and Member of 4th Lok Sabha from Maharajganj, Bihar Lok Sabha constituency. He was the only member of Rajendra Prasad's family who joined politics.

== Personal life ==
He was born on 2 January 1906 in Ziradei, Siwan district. He was the founder-member of College of Commerce, Arts and Science, Patna. He died at Patna on 19 October 1984.
