= Usha Narayanan =

10th First Lady of India (1922–2008)

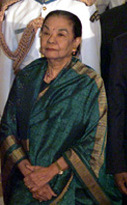
- Narayanan in 2000

First Lady of India
- In role 25 July 1997 – 25 July 2002
- President: Kocheril R. Narayanan
- Preceded by: Vimala Sharma
- Succeeded by: Devisingh Shekhawat (First Gentlemen)

Second Lady of India
- In role 21 August 1992 – 24 July 1997
- Vice President: Kocheril R. Narayanan
- Preceded by: Vimala Sharma
- Succeeded by: Shreemathi Suman

Personal details
- Born: Tint Tint; 1922 Yamethin, Burma
- Died: 24 January 2008 (aged 85–86) Rajendra Nagar, Delhi, India
- Spouse: K. R. Narayanan (m. 1951; died 2005)
- Children: 2 (including Chitra Narayanan)

Usha Narayanan, born Tint Tint (Burmese: တင့်တင့်; 1922 – 24 January 2008), was the First Lady of India from 1997 to 2002. She was married to K. R. Narayanan, the tenth President of India. Usha Narayanan was India's second foreign-born first lady (also second foreign-born second lady) after Janaki Venkataraman. She played a key role in women social welfare activities initiated by the presidency.

== Early life and education ==
Usha Narayanan was born as Tint Tint in 1922, in Yamethin, Burma. She attended Rangoon University, earning a Bachelor of Arts degree. Thereafter, she worked as a lecturing tutor at the Department of Burmese Language and Literature. She continued her graduate studies at the Delhi School of Social Work through a scholarship, earning a Master of Arts degree with a specialty in juvenile delinquency.

== Later life ==
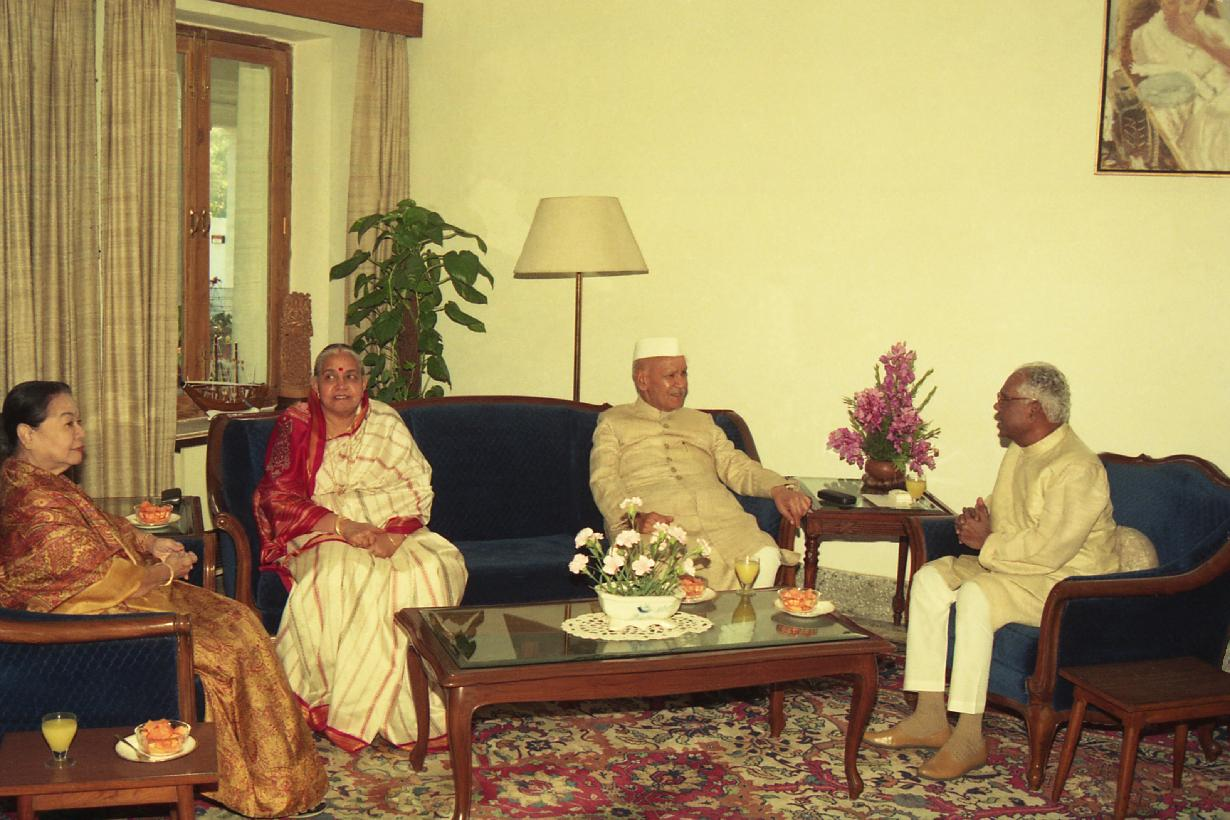
President Shankar Dayal Sharma(Centre Right) & First Lady Vimala Sharma(Centre Left) greet Vice President K.R. Narayanan(Right) on his Birthday alongside his wife Second Lady Mrs Usha Narayanan (Left).

While working in Rangoon, Burma (now Myanmar), K. R. Narayanan met Tint Tint, whom he later married in Delhi on 8 June 1951. Ms Tint Tint was active in the YWCA and on hearing that Narayanan was a student of Laski, approached him to speak on political freedom before her circle of acquaintances. While K. R. Narayanan and Tint Tint had been born in the same country, the British colony of India, by the time they met they had different citizenship. Their marriage needed a special dispensation from Jawaharlal Nehru per Indian law, because Narayanan was in the IFS and she was a foreigner. Ms Tint Tint adopted the Indian name Usha and became an Indian citizen.

They have two daughters, Chitra Narayanan (former Indian ambassador to Switzerland, Liechtenstein and The Holy See) and Amrita Narayanan.

== Work ==
Usha Narayanan worked on several social welfare programs for women and children in India and had completed her Masters in Social Work from Delhi School of Social Work. She also translated and published several Burmese short stories; a collection of translated stories by Thein Pe Myint, titled Sweet and Sour, appeared in 1998.

== Death ==
Usha, was suffering from Alzheimer's disease, for the last few years of her life, and died at the age of 86 on 24 January 2008 at 5:30 pm, at Sir Ganga Ram Hospital. She was buried in the Christian Cemetery on Prithivraj Road, Delhi. In 2017, a controversy erupted when her husband's name was also found in her grave.

== See also ==
- First ladies and gentlemen of India
