= First ladies and gentlemen of India =

Spouse of the president of India

First Gentlemen/Ladies of India
- State Emblem of India

- Flag of India
- Incumbent; Vacant since 25 July 2022
- Residence: Rashtrapati Bhavan, Delhi (primary); Rashtrapati Nilayam, Hyderabad (winter); The Retreat Building, Shimla (summer)
- Inaugural holder: Rajvanshi Devi
- Formation: 26 January 1950; 76 years ago
- Deputy: Spouse of the Vice President of India

First Lady of India or First Gentleman of India is the title given to the host of the Rashtrapati Bhavan, usually the spouse of the president of India. There are no official roles or duties assigned to the spouse. The spouse generally attends official ceremonies and functions.

The position of a first spouse of India is currently vacant, as President Droupadi Murmu is widowed.

== History ==
Rajvanshi Devi, the wife of India's first president, was the country's first lady from 1950 until 1962. Devi kept a very low profile during this era and did not attend public events with President Rajendra Prasad.

The post was vacant during the tenure of Sarvepalli Radhakrishnan and was followed by Shah Jahan Begum, who was the wife of India's third president, Zakir Husain.

Saraswati Bai, wife of the country's fourth president, V. V. Giri, was the first first lady to take a more public role. Bai's role marked a change from the lower profile of her predecessors. She attended and hosted public events and became a recognizable figure to the Indian public.

Abida Ahmed, India's first lady from 1974 to 1977, further expanded the public role of the first lady's position by organizing ceremonies and official functions at the Rashtrapati Bhavan. She was also the first among the first spouses to hold a public office when she was Member of Parliament between 1980 and 1989.

Usha Narayanan was the first spouse of foreign origin.

Before Pratibha Patil was sworn in as the first female president of India, the role of the wives of the president was to act as the chief hostess of the Bhavan. In 2007, the office room meant for the first lady went for some minor changes to accommodate the husband of Pratibha Patil, Devisingh Ransingh Shekhawat, the country's inaugural "first gentleman".

Former first lady Suvra Mukherjee, the wife of President Pranab Mukherjee, died in office on 18 August 2015. The position of First Lady remained vacant for the remainder of President Mukherjee's term.

The position is currently vacant since 2022, as President Droupadi Murmu is a widow.

== Role ==
The role of a first spouse is largely ceremonial. The first spouse has no official duties, but will generally attend the official ceremonies and functions held at the Rashtrapati Bhavan along with the president. Most first spouses have maintained a low profile.

=== Non-spouses in the role ===
In case of the absence of a spouse, another relative of the president may take up the role of host or hostess during official functions at the Rashtrapati Bhavan. However, this is not mandatory, as, for instance, the role of hostess was vacant during the tenure of A. P. J. Abdul Kalam.

Zail Singh's daughter had served as hostess for some events. Pranab Mukherjee's daughter Sharmistha Mukherjee served as hostess for some events, during her mother's illness.

== List of first ladies and gentlemen of India ==
No.	Portrait	Name	Tenure	President
1		Rajvanshi Devi; 17 July 1886 – 9 September 1962 (aged 76)	26 January 1950 – 12 May 1962	Rajendra Prasad m. 1896
–	vacant (Note: Sivakamu Radhakrishnan, wife of Sarvepalli Radhakrishnan died at her home in Madras in 1956, before her husband became president. Though she was the Second Lady of India at the time of her death.)		12 May 1962 – 13 May 1967	Sarvepalli Radhakrishnan m. 1903
2		Shah Jahan Begum	13 May 1967 – 3 May 1969	Zakir Husain m. 1915
Acting		Saraswati Bai	3 May 1969 – 20 July 1969	V. V. Giri (acting) m. 1917
Acting		Pushpa Shah (Note: Second Lady of India from 1979–1984)	20 July 1969 – 24 August 1969	Mohammad Hidayatullah (acting) m. 1948
3		Saraswati Bai	24 August 1969 – 24 August 1974	V. V. Giri m. 1917
4		Abida Ahmed; 17 July 1923 – 7 December 2003 (aged 80)	24 August 1974 – 11 February 1977	Fakhruddin Ali Ahmed m. 1945
Acting		Sangamma Jatti	11 February 1977 – 25 July 1977	B. D. Jatti (acting) m. 1922
5		Nagaratnamma Reddy	25 July 1977 – 25 July 1982	Neelam Sanjiva Reddy m. 1935
6		Pardhan Kaur (Note: Zail Singh's daughter had served as hostess for some events.)	25 July 1982 – 25 July 1987	Zail Singh m. 1934
7		Janaki Venkataraman; 1921 – 13 August 2010 (aged 88–89)	25 July 1987 – 25 July 1992	Ramaswamy Venkataraman m. 1938
8		Vimala Sharma; 1927 – 15 August 2020 (aged 93)	25 July 1992 – 25 July 1997	Shankar Dayal Sharma m. 1950
9		Usha Narayanan (Note: India's first foreign born (Burma) First Lady and the first one of foreign origin); 1922 — 24 January 2008 (aged 85–86)	25 July 1997 – 25 July 2002	K. R. Narayanan m. 1951
–	unmarried (Note: The role of hostess, during official functions at the Rashtrapati Bhavan, was vacant during the tenure of A. P. J. Abdul Kalam.)		25 July 2002 – 25 July 2007	A. P. J. Abdul Kalam
10		Devisingh Ransingh Shekhawat (Note: Shekhawat was India's first and only First Gentleman.); 1934 – 24 February 2023 (aged 88–89)	25 July 2007 – 25 July 2012	Pratibha Patil m. 1965
11		Suvra Mukherjee (Note: Suvra Mukherjee was the first First Lady to die during her husband's presidency.) (Note: While the position of First Lady was vacant following the death of First Lady Suvra Mukherjee, Mukherjee's daughter, Sharmistha Mukherjee, served as hostess for some events, during her mother's illness and following her death.); 17 September 1940 – 18 August 2015 (aged 74)	25 July 2012 – 18 August 2015	Pranab Mukherjee m. 1957
11	vacant		18 August 2015 – 25 July 2017	Pranab Mukherjee m. 1957
12		Savita Kovind; April 15, 1952 (age 74)	25 July 2017 – 25 July 2022	Ram Nath Kovind m. 1974
–	vacant (Note: Shyam Charan Murmu, husband of Droupadi Murmu, died at his home in Rairangpur in 2014, before his wife became President.)		25 July 2022 – Present	Droupadi Murmu m. 1980

== See also ==
- List of presidents of India
- Spouse of the prime minister of India
