= Devisingh Ransingh Shekhawat =

Former First Gentleman of India

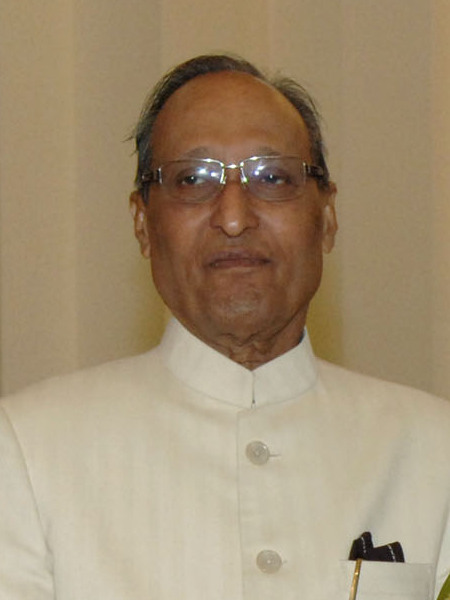
- Shekhawat in 2010

First Gentleman of India
- In role 25 July 2007 – 25 July 2012
- President: Pratibha Patil
- Preceded by: Usha Narayanan (As First Lady)
- Succeeded by: Suvra Mukherjee (As First Lady)

First Gentleman of Rajasthan
- In role 8 November 2004 – 23 June 2007
- Governor: Pratibha Patil
- Preceded by: Raj Khurana
- Succeeded by: Jamila Kidwai

Member of Maharashtra Legislative Assembly
- In office 1985–1990
- Preceded by: Surendra Chhatrapal Bhuyar
- Succeeded by: Jagdish Motilal Gupta
- Constituency: Amravati

Personal details
- Born: c. 1934
- Died: 24 February 2023 (aged 88–89) Pune, Maharashtra, India
- Citizenship: Indian
- Spouse: Pratibha Patil (m. 1965)
- Children: 2
- Occupation: Agriculturist; politician

Devisingh Ransingh Shekhawat (c. 1934 – 24 February 2023) was an Indian agriculturist and politician who served as the first first gentleman of India as the husband of President Pratibha Patil. He also served as the first gentleman of Rajasthan and also as mayor of Amravati. He was a member of the Indian National Congress.

== Early life ==
Devisingh Ransingh Shekhawat, who was then a lecturer in chemistry, married Pratibha Patil on 7 July 1965. The couple had a daughter and a son, Raosaheb Shekhawat, who is also a politician.

Shekhawat was awarded a PhD from the University of Mumbai in 1972. Prior to his wife's elevation to her presidential role, he had been principal of a college operated by his wife's Vidya Bharati Shikshan Sanstha foundation and also a First Mayor of Amravati (1991–1992). Like his wife, he was a member of the Indian National Congress party. He was also an agriculturalist and a former member of the Legislative Assembly, being elected for the period 1985–1990 from the Amravati constituency in the Maharashtra state legislature. He lost his deposit in the 1995 contest for that constituency.

Various accusations against Shekhawat and Patil emerged after the latter was nominated for the office of president. Among these was the case of Kisan Dhage, a teacher in a school run by Vidya Prasarak Shikshan Mandal in Buldhana district, who committed suicide in November 1998. He left a note saying that he was committing suicide because he was tired of the mental harassment caused by Shekhawat, who was chairman of the institution, and four others. When the police registered the case as "accidental death", Dhage's wife appealed to the Judicial Magistrate First Class (JMFC) in Jalgaon Jamod, a tehsil in Buldhana district. The JMFC ordered the police to start criminal proceedings. Shekhawat petitioned the courts seeking dismissal of charges of abetting Dhage's suicide. Two lower courts turned down this plea and by June 2007 the issue was pending in the Bombay High Court. A judge at that court dismissed the charges against Shekhawat in 2009 on the grounds that there was no proof of direct involvement, although one of his co-accused remained subject to the proceedings.

In 2009, a court ruled that Shekhawat had colluded with five relatives and local officials to illegally transfer into his ownership 2.5 acres (1.0 ha) of land in Chandrapur belonging to a Dalit farmer. This was one of several allegations of corruption and irregularities to emerge during Patil's presidency in relation to her and her family.

== First Gentleman of Rajasthan (2004–2007) ==
Upon Shekhawat's wife's succession as governor of Rajasthan, he moved into Raj Bhavan, Jaipur succeeding as the first gentleman of Rajasthan for 3 years.

== First Gentleman of India (2007–2012) ==
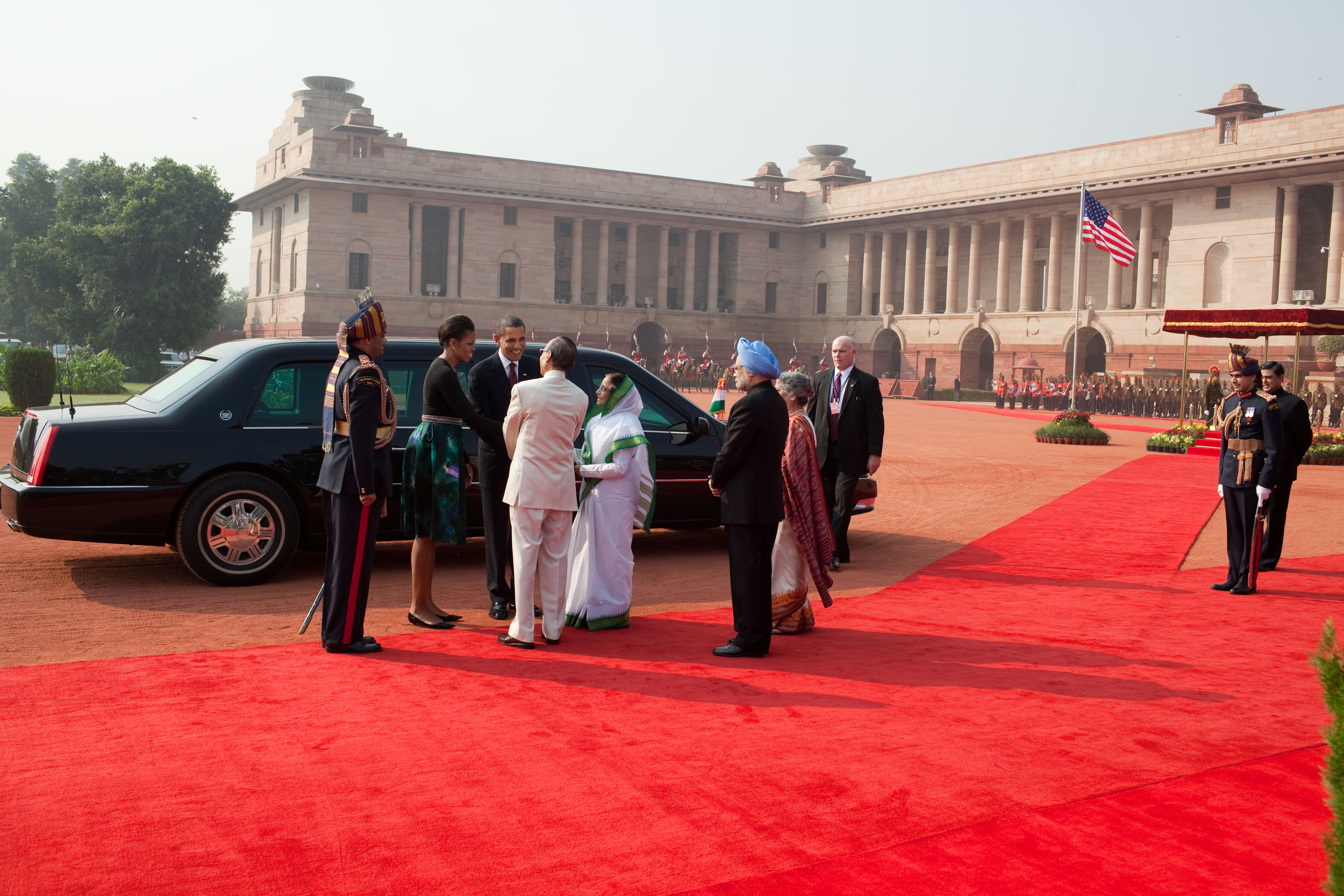
44th United States President Barack Obama and First Lady Michelle Obama are greeted by President Pratibha Devisingh Patil and First Gentleman Devisingh shekawat.

On 25 July 2007 Shekhawat became the first first gentleman of India upon his wife's succession as the twelfth — and first woman — President of India for a full five-year term.

== Death ==
Shekhawat died on 24 February 2023 at the age of 89.

Honorary titles
Vacant Title last held by Usha Narayanan	First Gentleman of India; 2007–2012	Succeeded by Suvra Mukherjee
