= Chitra Narayanan =

Indian diplomat (born 1950)

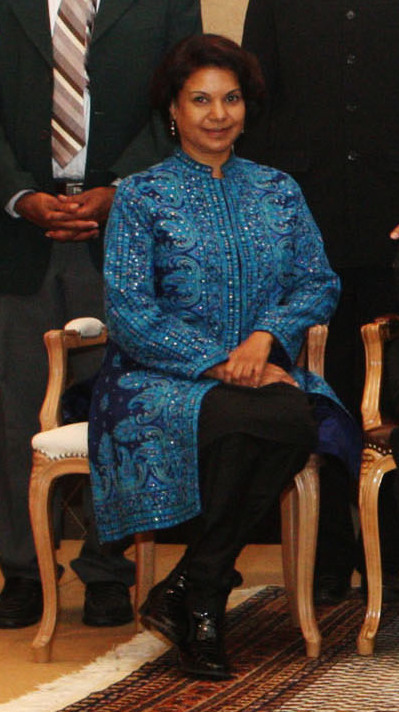
- Chitra Narayanan in 2011

Ambassador of India to Switzerland
- In office 2010–2013

Ambassador of India to Liechtenstein
- In office 2010–2013

Personal details
- Born: India
- Education: University of Madras
- Occupation: Diplomat

Chitra Narayanan is a diplomat from India. She served as an Indian Foreign Service officer and as an ambassador of India to six countries.

== Career ==
Chitra started her career as a journalist at the Press Institute of India. She was the founder-editor and co-publisher of The Book Review, the first English speaking journal in India dedicated to books. She joined the Indian Foreign Services at age 26, in 1978. She was the Deputy Director of Foreign Service Institute from 1988–91. She serves as a fellow at Institute of Contemporary Studies, Nehru Museum and Library, New Delhi from 1995 to 2000. She served as the ambassador of India to Sweden and Latvia (2001–2005), Turkey (2005–2008), Switzerland and Liechtenstein (2008–2013) and the Holy See (Vatican) (2009–2013). She is an associate fellow at the Geneva Center of Security Policy and Course Director of the executive course on Creative Diplomacy which teaches creative leadership and decision making skills relevant to the challenges of today.

== Personal life ==
Chitra is the daughter of the former President of India, K. R. Narayanan and Usha Narayanan. Due to the nature of the job of her father as an Indian Foreign Service officer, she got to do her schooling in different parts of the world, including in London, Australia, at a boarding school in the Himalayas and in New Delhi. She was homeschooled for one and a half years in Hanoi. She then completed her undergraduate studies in political science and postgraduate studies in international relations specializing in Chinese politics at Delhi University. She has a daughter, Chandrika, who is a writer and arts manager living in Dublin. She has a sister Amrita who lives in Bonn.
