= Gopal Swarup Pathak =

Vice President of India from 1969 to 1974

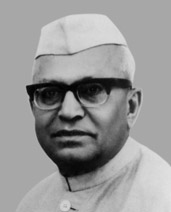
- Official portrait, c. 1970

Vice President of India
- In office 31 August 1969 – 30 August 1974
- President: V. V. Giri; Fakhruddin Ali Ahmed
- Prime Minister: Indira Gandhi
- Preceded by: V. V. Giri
- Succeeded by: B. D. Jatti

Governor of Mysore
- In office 13 May 1967 – 31 August 1969
- Chief Minister: S. Nijalingappa; Veerendra Patil
- Preceded by: V. V. Giri
- Succeeded by: Dharma Vira

Union Minister of Law and Justice
- In office 24 January 1966 – 13 March 1967
- Prime Minister: Indira Gandhi
- Preceded by: Ashoke Kumar Sen
- Succeeded by: Panampilly Govinda Menon

Personal details
- Born: 26 February 1896 Bareilly, North-Western Provinces, British India (present-day Uttar Pradesh, India)
- Died: 4 October 1982 (aged 86)
- Party: Independent
- Spouse: Prakashwati Pathak
- Education: Allahabad University

Gopal Swarup Pathak (26 February 1896 – 31 August 1982) was the vice president of India from August 1969 to August 1974. He was the first Indian vice president not to succeed his superior as President.

== Life ==
Born on 26 February 1896 at Bareilly in the North-Western Provinces, he studied law at Allahabad University .

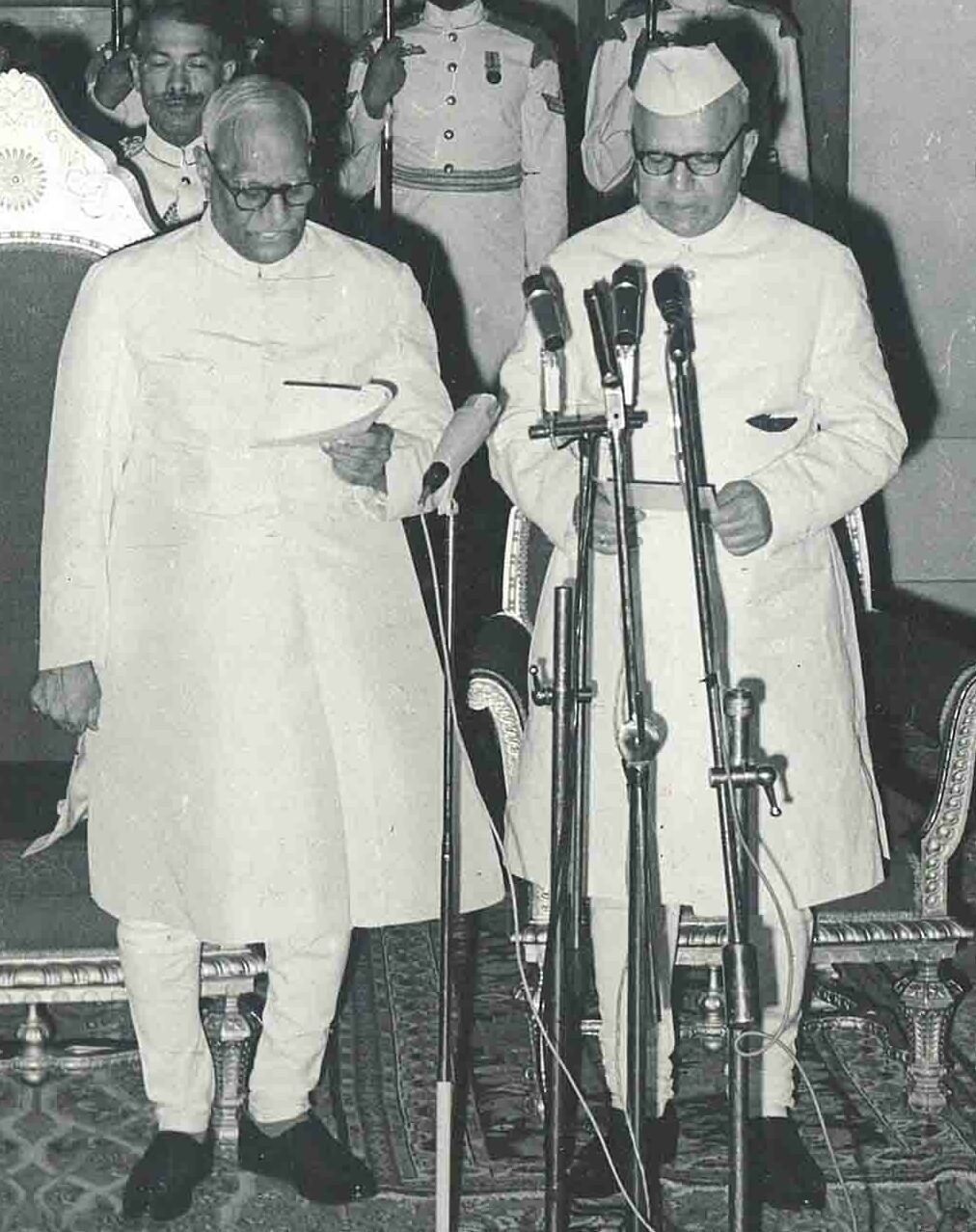
Pathak being sworned as the Vice President of India, c. 1969

He was a judge in Allahabad High Court 1945-46, member of Rajya Sabha 1960-66, Union Minister of Law 1966-67, Governor of Mysore state 1967–69 and Chancellor of Mysore University, Bangalore University and Karnataka University. Honored with "Proud Past Alumni" in the list of 42 members, from "Allahabad University Alumni Association", NCR, Ghaziabad (Greater Noida) Chapter 2007–2008 registered under society act 1860 with registration no. 407/2000.

He died on 4 October 1982. His son R. S. Pathak was Chief Justice of India and one of the four judges from India to have been on the International Court of Justice in The Hague (the others being Nagendra Singh who served as its President from 1985 to 1988, B. N. Rau (1952–1953), and Dalveer Bhandari since 2012).

== Vice President (1969-1974) ==
Political offices
Preceded by Varahagiri Venkata Giri	Governor of Karnataka; 1967–1969	Succeeded by Dharma Vira
Preceded by Varahagiri Venkata Giri	Vice-President of India; 1969–1974	Succeeded by Basappa Danappa Jatti
