= Sharmistha Mukherjee =

Indian Kathak dancer, choreographer and politician

Sharmisthaa Mukherjee
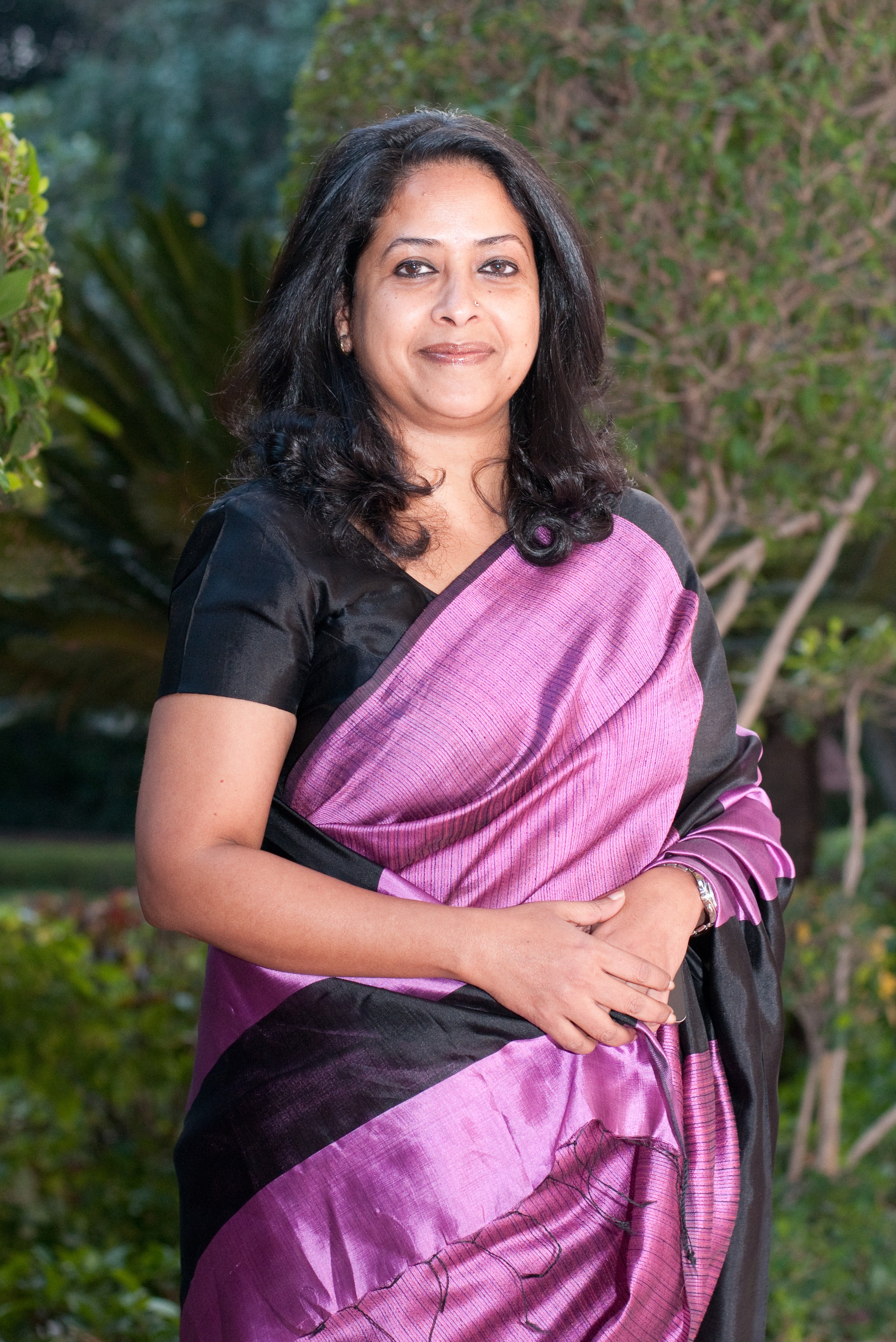

Personal details
- Born: 30 October 1965 (age 60) West Bengal, India
- Party: Indian National Congress (until 2021)
- Relations: Abhijit Mukherjee (brother)
- Parents: Pranab Mukherjee (father); Suvra Mukherjee (mother)

Sharmistha Mukherjee (born 30 October 1965) is an Indian Kathak dancer, choreographer and ex-politician of the Indian National Congress.

== Early life and education ==
Born in West Bengal, Mukherjee grew up in Delhi and was educated at St. Stephen’s College, Delhi. Her father was Pranab Mukherjee, who was the 13th President of the Republic of India.

== Dance career ==
Mukherjee began formal dance training at age 12. Her teachers included Pandit Durgalal, Vidushi Uma Sharma and Rajendra Gangani. The Hindu called her performances "accomplished" and lauded her precise footwork.

== Politics ==
Sharmistha joined the INC in July 2014. Since then she has been actively participating in rallies organized by the party and working at the grass root level with the party workers in her area. She contested the Delhi Assembly election in February 2015 from the Greater Kailash constituency but lost, coming third with 6,102 votes after Saurabh Bharadwaj (AAP, 57,589 votes) and Rakesh Gullaiya (BJP, 43,006 votes). Mukherjee quit active politics in 2021.

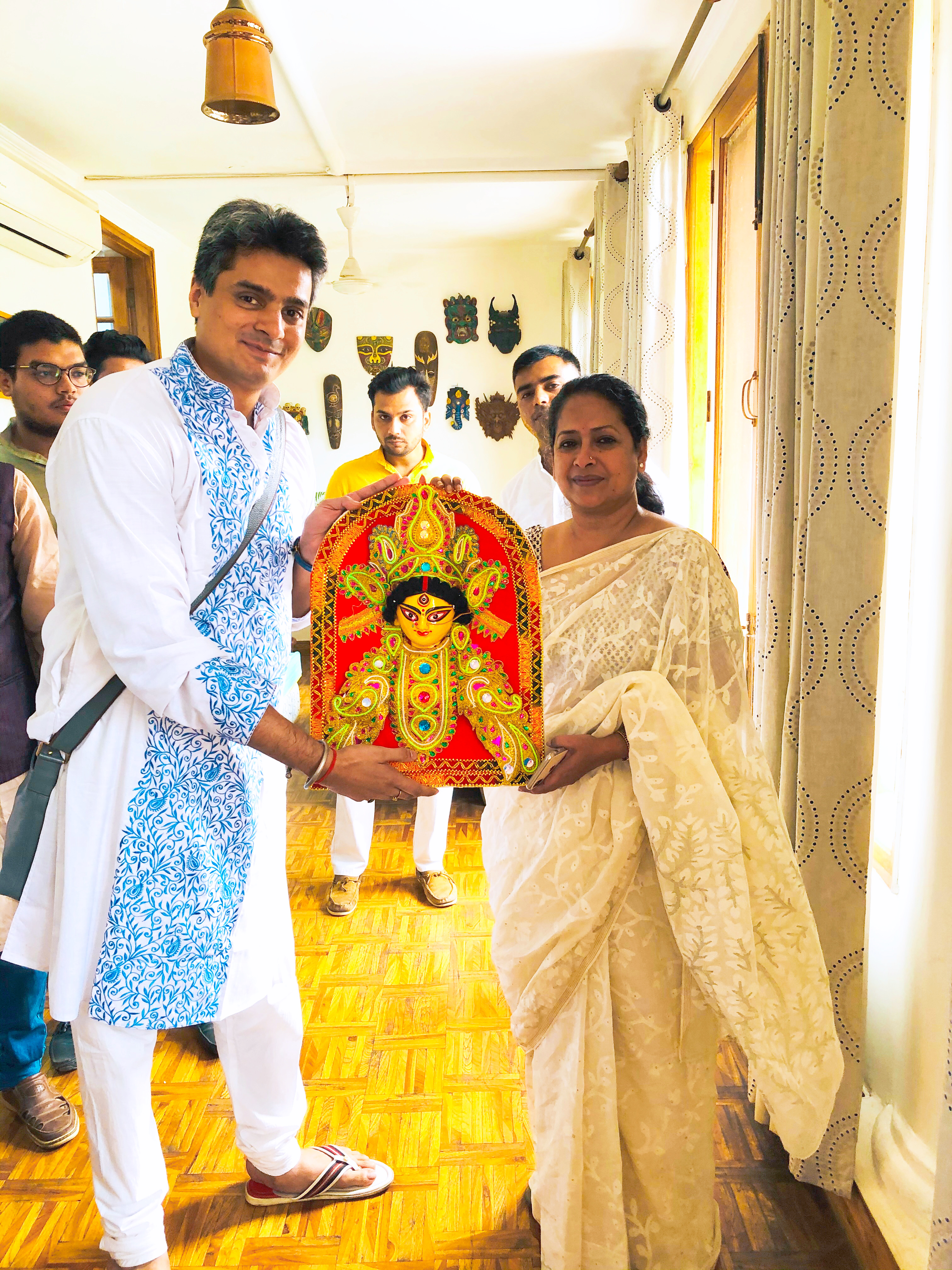
Receiving a plaque from a party worker.

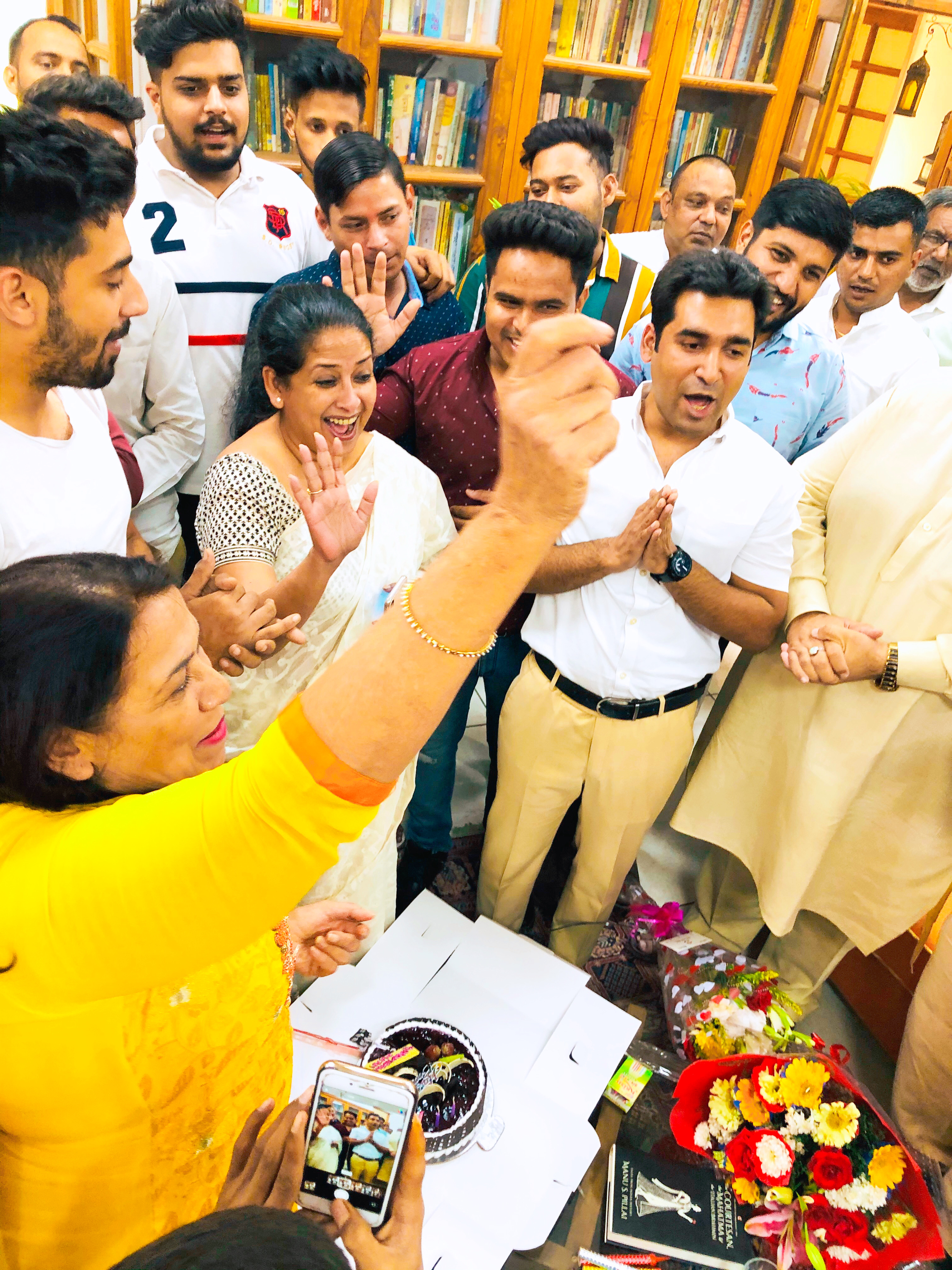
Celebrating her birthday with party workers
