= Pardhan Kaur =

Former First Lady of India

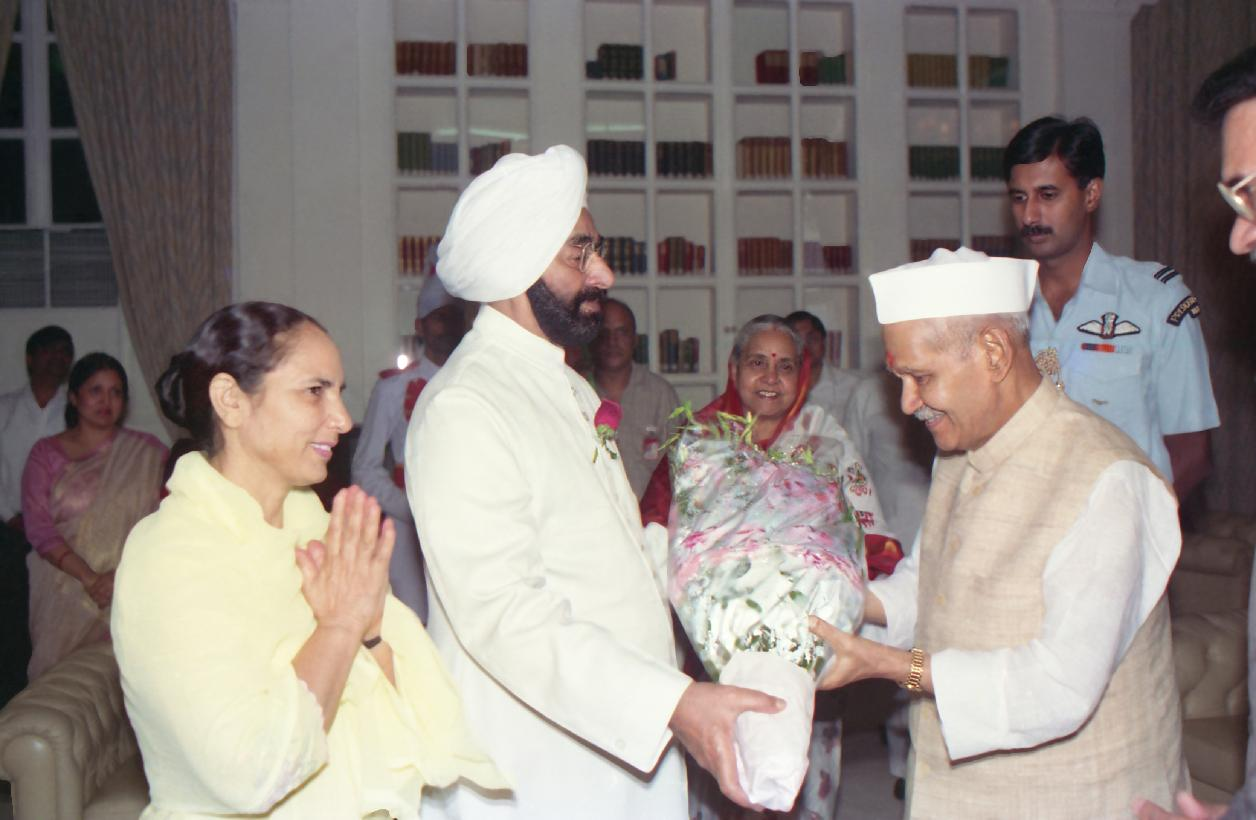
The President of India, Shankar Dayal Sharma receives birthday greetings from former President, Zail Singh and the former first lady, at the Rashtrapati Bhavan

Pardhan Kaur (died 13 May 2002) was an Indian public figure who served as the First Lady of India from 1982 to 1987 as the wife of President Zail Singh.

== Personal life ==
She married Zail Singh and had one son and three daughters. On 13 May 2002, she died as a widow.
