= Shah Jahan Begum (first lady) =

First Lady of India

Personal details
- Spouse: Zakir Husain

Shah Jahan Begum was the First Lady of India, (having previously served as the Second Lady of India). She was the spouse of Zakir Husain.

She observed purdah as a strict Muslim, and therefore kept a low profile.
