= Savita Kovind =

Former First Lady of India

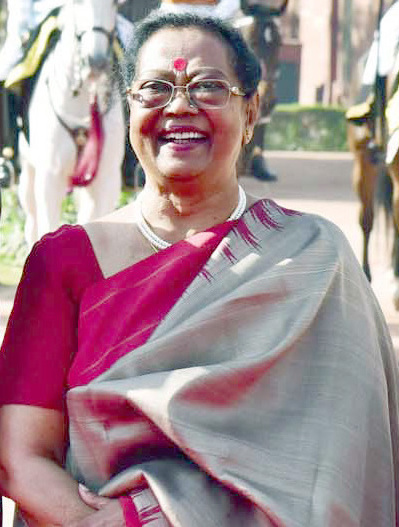
- Kovind in 2018

First Lady of India
- In role 25 July 2017 – 25 July 2022
- President: Ram Nath Kovind
- Preceded by: Suvra Mukherjee
- Succeeded by: Vacant (Note: Shyam Chandra Murmu, husband of President Droupadi Murmu, died in 2014, 8 years before his wife took office.)

First Lady of Bihar
- In role 16 August 2015 – 20 June 2017
- Governor: Ram Nath Kovind
- Preceded by: Sudha Tripathi
- Succeeded by: Sudha Tripathi

Personal details
- Born: 15 April 1952 (age 74)
- Party: Independent
- Spouse: Ram Nath Kovind (m. 1974)
- Children: 2
- Occupation: Government worker

Savita Kovind (Hindi: Savitā Kovinda, pronounced [sɐʋɪt̪ɑː koʋɪ̃d̪ɐ]; born 15 April 1952) is a former Indian government servant who served as the First Lady of India from 2017 to 2022 as the wife of the 14th President of India, Ram Nath Kovind. She was Chief Section Supervisor in Mahanagar Telephone Nigam Limited before retiring in 2005.

== Early life ==
Savita Kovind was born on 15 April 1952. Her parents originally lived near Lahore in present-day Pakistan and moved to India post-partition and settled in Lajpat Nagar in Delhi. She is a former employee in Mahanagar Telephone Nigam Limited (MTNL). She started her career in MTNL as a telephone operator. Gradually she got promoted to the post of Chief Section Supervisor. But in 2005, she took voluntary retirement.

== Personal life ==
Savita Devi married Ram Nath Kovind on 30 May 1974. They have two children, son Prashant Kumar Kovind and daughter Swati Kovind, as well as grandchildren. Her daughter Swati is a former air hostess employed in Air India.

== First Lady of Bihar (2015–2017) ==
Savita Devi served as the First Lady of Bihar from 16 August 2015 to 20 June 2017 during Ramnath Kovind's Governorship. First Lady of Bihar isn't an official post rather it is a role to be served. She was succeeded by her predecessor Sudha Tripathi after her husband's elevation to the Presidency assuming the role of First Lady of India.

== First Lady of India (2017–2022) ==
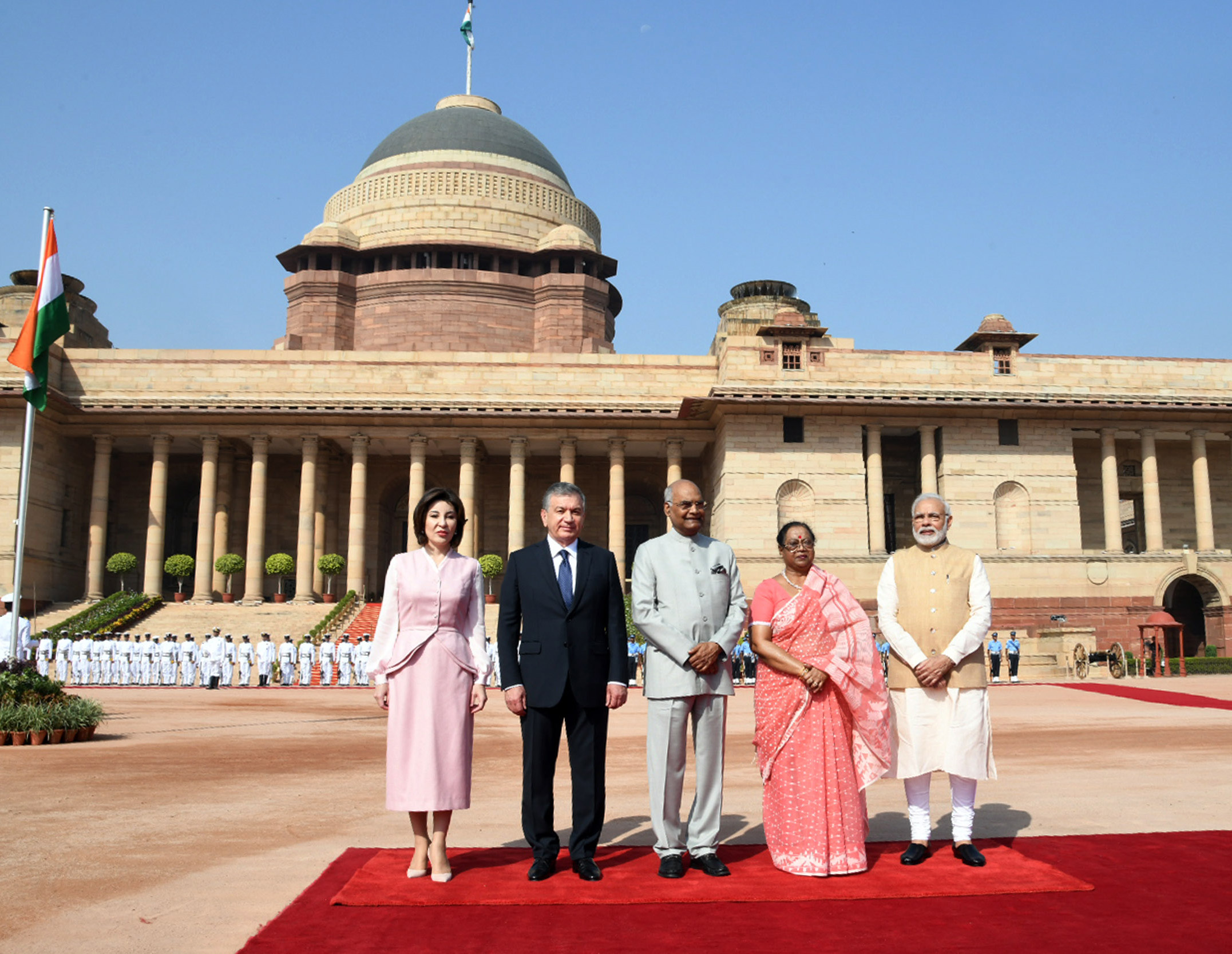
Kovind with her husband (center) Ziroat Mirziyoyeva (far-left), Shavkat Mirziyoyev (center-left), Ram Nath Kovind, and Narendra Modi (far-right)

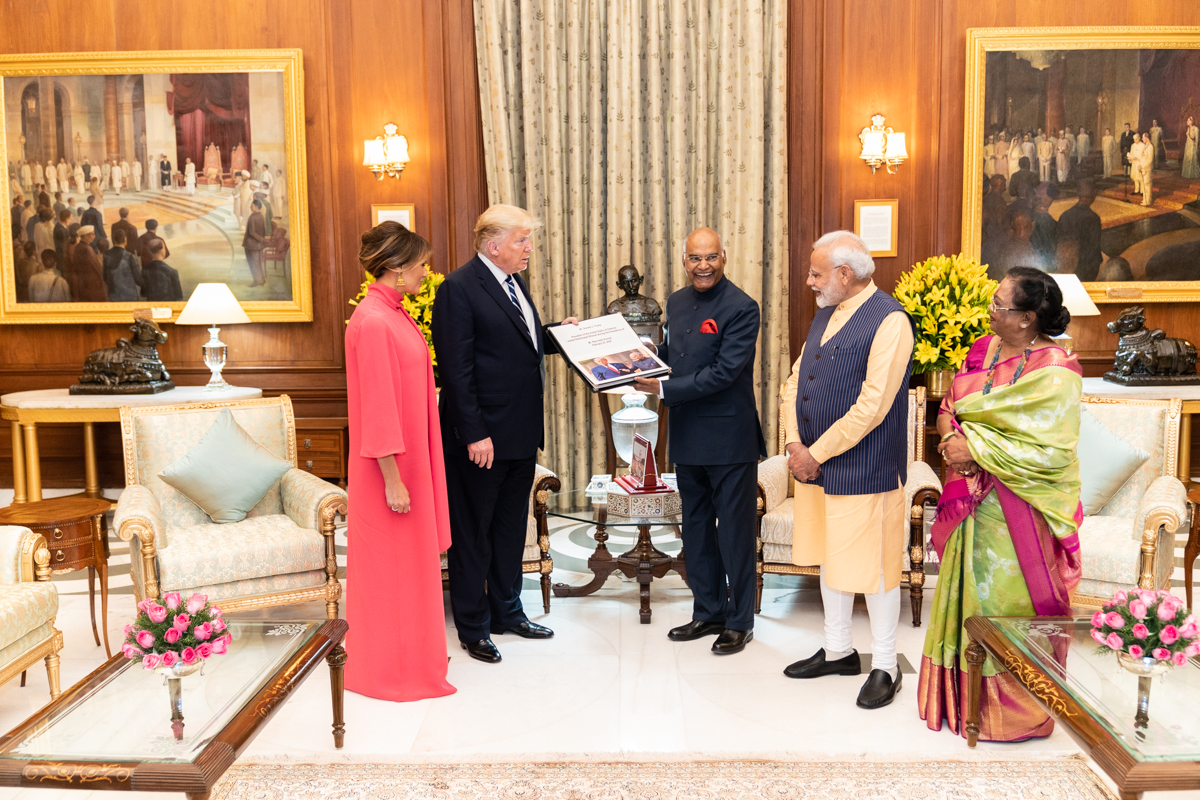
First Lady Kovind with President Ram Nath Kovind host a state dinner for Donald Trump, Melania Trump and Narendra Modi at the Rashtrapati Bhavan.

Kovind assumed the role of First Lady of India on 25 July 2017 after nearly 2 years of vacancy since the former first lady died in office. India's first spouses act as the official hosts of Rashtrapati Bhavan.

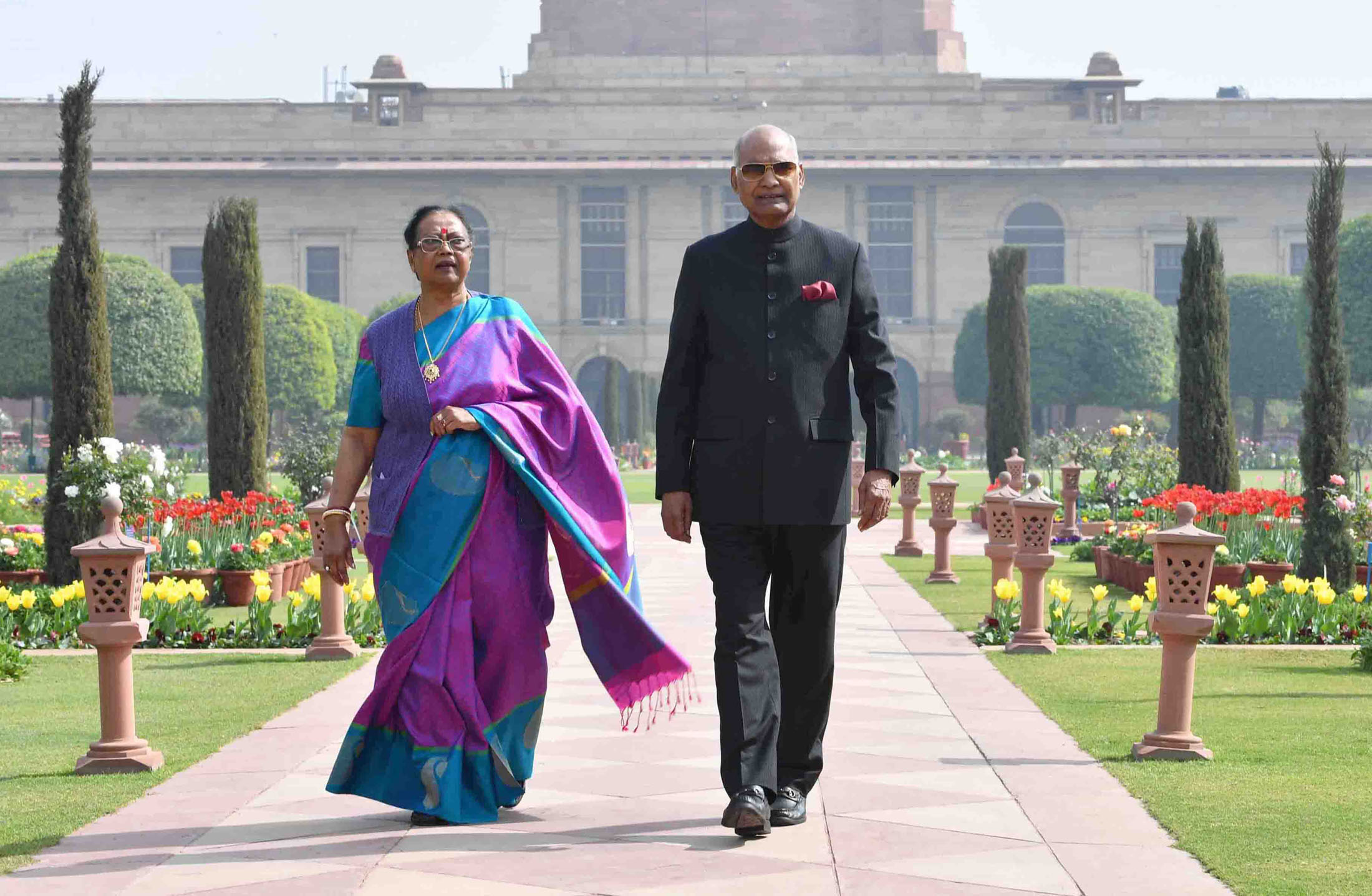
Savita Kovind with her spouse Ram Nath Kovind

=== Covid-19 pandemic ===
During the COVID-19 pandemic in India, Kovind stitched face masks to be distributed at numerous shelter homes in New Delhi, in order to promote mask usage. She also helped prepare meals to be sent to the traditional community kitchen of Gurdwara Rakab Ganj.

=== State visits ===
She accompanied the president on various state visits.

== See also ==
- Presidency of Ram Nath Kovind

Honorary titles
Preceded by Sudha Tripathi	First Lady of Bihar; 2015–2017	Succeeded by Sudha Tripathi
Vacant Title last held by Suvra Mukherjee	First Lady of India; 2017–2022	Vacant
