= Ismail Hossain Khan =

Indian politician

Member of Parliament, Lok Sabha
- In office 1977–1979
- Constituency: Barpeta

Personal details
- Education: LLB
- Alma mater: Gauhati University

Ismail Hossain Khan was one of the former MPs of Indian parliament from Barpeta constituency.

== Early life and education ==
Khan was born in a small village kumullipara in Barpeta, Assam, and completed his education from DPHS school, and later earned his LLB from Gawhati University.

== Career ==
Khan came into politics in the year 1965 becoming two time MP from Barpeta. After retiring from politics he did social service for poor and illiterate people.
