= Edward Nowak (engineer) =

Polish engineer and politician (born 1950)

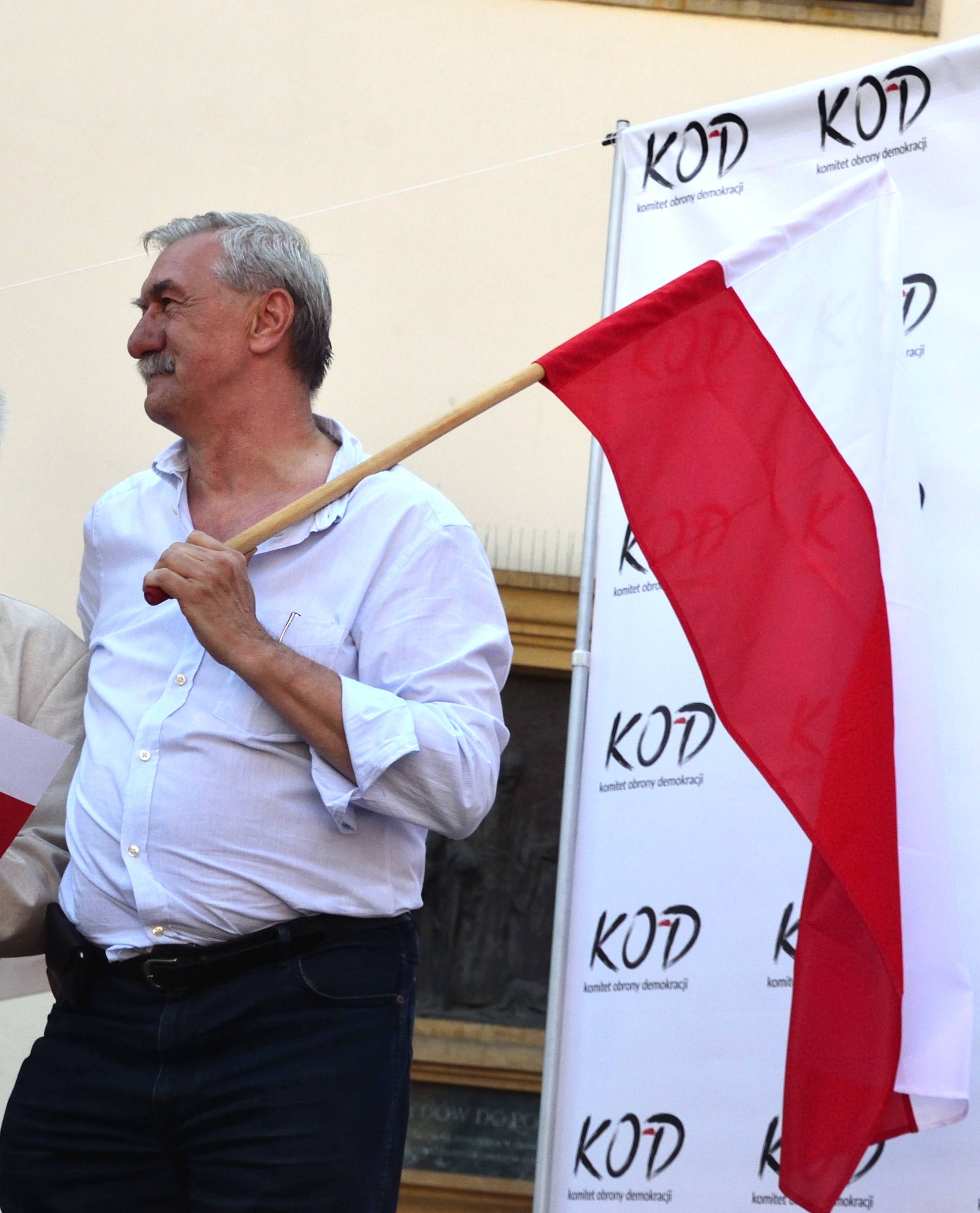
- Edward Nowak in 2016
- Constituency: no. 49

Member of the Contract Sejm
- In office 18 June 1989 – 25 November 1991

Undersecretary of State in Ministry of Industry and Trade
- In office 8 January 1992 – 2 February 1993
- Minister: Andrzej Lipko (1992); Wacław Niewiarowski (1992-1993)
- In office 18 November 1993 – 10 April 1995
- Minister: Marek Pol (1993-1995); Klemens Ścierski (1995)

Undersecretary of State in Ministry of the Economy
- In office 1 August 2000 – 24 October 2001
- Minister: Janusz Steinhoff

Deputy President of Kraków
- In office 25 June 1990 – 11 January 1991
- President: Jacek Woźniakowski

Personal details
- Born: 16 November 1950 (age 75) Kraków
- Party: Civic Parliamentary Club
- Awards: Officer's Cross of Polonia Restituta; Knight's Cross of Polonia Restituta; Cross of Freedom and Solidarity; Bronze Cross of Merit; "Unwavering in Word" Medal

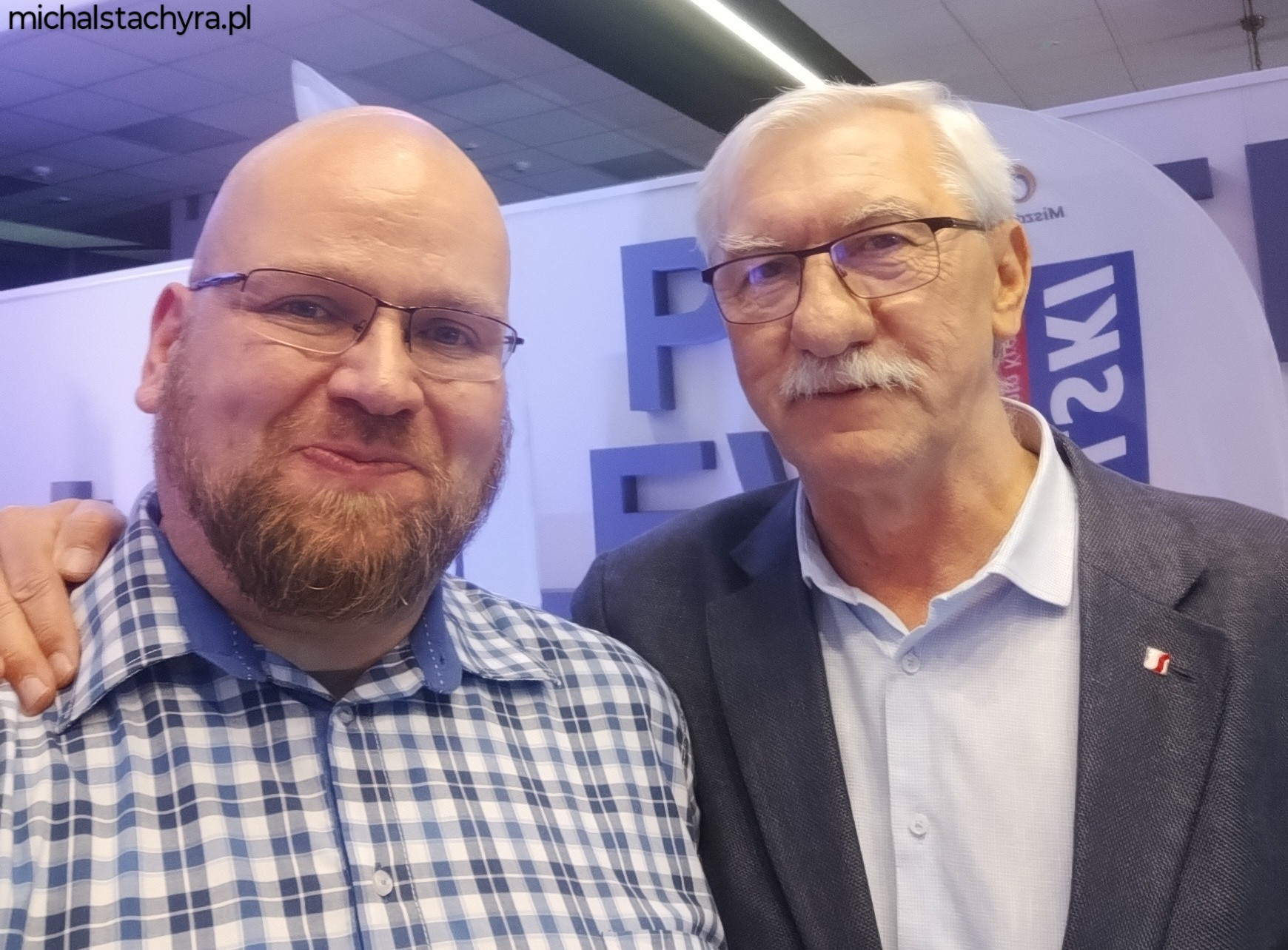
Michał Stachyra and Edward Nowak in Kraków in 2024

Edward Edmund Nowak (born 16 November 1950 in Kraków) is a Polish engineer, opposition activist in the Polish People's Republic, administrator, state official and politician.

He has been a member of NSZZ “Solidarność” since 1980. He took part in the strikes at the Lenin Steelworks. He was arrested following the imposition of martial law in Poland and sentenced by a military court to three years and six months’ imprisonment. He was released under an amnesty in 1983. He was subsequently placed under surveillance by Security Service officers and was detained and interrogated on numerous occasions.

He served as a member of the Sejm for the 10th term. Deputy Mayor of Kraków from 1990 to 1991; Undersecretary of State in Ministry of Industry and Trade from 1992 to 1993 and from 1993 to 1995; Undersecretary of State at the Ministry of the Economy from 2000 to 2001. He was instrumental in reviving the Kraków Chamber of Industry and Commerce; he served as its president from 1989 to 1994.

== Biography ==
=== Polish People's Republic ===
In 1979, he graduated in electrical power engineering from the Faculty of Electrical Engineering, Automation and Electronics at the AGH University of Science and Technology in Kraków.

Between 1969 and 1985, he was employed at the Lenin Steelworks. Between 1971 and 1981, he was a member of the Polish United Workers' Party.

In August 1980, he joined the Independent Self-Governing Trade Union ‘Solidarity’. He was a member of the strike committee at the rolling mill department of his workplace, and in September he co-founded the ‘Solidarity’ structures within the steelworks. He became a member of the Steelworkers’ Committee. From 17 March 1981, he served as the representative of the Lenin Steelworks in the “Solidarity” Network of Workplace Organisations. He took part in work on the national economic programme for “Solidarity” and on the draft of the so-called “social enterprise”, intended as an alternative to the government’s enterprise management schemes. In 1981, together with Mirosław Dzielski, he co-founded a housing cooperative organised by the Steelworkers’ Workers’ Committee, as well as an educational initiative known as the University of Democracy. In the same year, he became chairman of the founding committee of the steelworks’ workers’ self-government. In July 1981, he was a delegate at the First General Assembly of Delegates of the Małopolska Region in Tarnów. He subsequently took part in the First National Congress of Delegates of NSZZ “Solidarność” in Gdańsk.

From 13 to 16 December 1981, following the imposition of martial law, he was a member of the Strike Committee at the Lenin Steelworks. After the strike was suppressed, he went into hiding. On 13 January 1982, Edward Nowak was detained and subsequently remanded in custody. On 25 February 1982, for organising the strike, he was sentenced in summary proceedings by a military court in Warsaw to three years and six months’ imprisonment; he was also deprived of his civil rights for two years. He lost his job at the steelworks at that time. He was initially held in a remand centre in Kraków, and subsequently, amongst other places, in Racibórz Prison. He was released on 8 August 1983 under an amnesty. In August 1983, he was reinstated at the Lenin Steelworks, but on worse terms of employment than before.

He served as an adviser to the Secret Workers’ Commission of Steelworkers. In March 1984, he co-founded the Society for Aid to Prisoners, and in November of that year, the Citizens’ Initiative in Defence of Human Rights Against Violence. On 3 May 1985, he was detained and subsequently re-arrested for taking part in the celebrations marking the anniversary of the adoption of the Constitution of 3 May in Kraków. He was then dismissed from his job once again. He was released from custody on 3 July 1985. Until the end of the 1980s, he was under surveillance by officers of the Security Service, and was detained and interrogated.

Between 1985 and 1986, he worked as a senior specialist at CERPRI, the Construction Ceramics Industry Investment Implementation Company. Between 1986 and 1988, he was a plant manager at the ARTCO Foreign Trade Company in Brzezie. From October 1986, he was a member of the open Steelworkers’ Commission; in the same year, he was one of the press spokespeople for the strike at the Lenin Steelworks.

=== Third Polish Republic ===
In 1989, he became active in the Kraków ‘Solidarity’ Citizens’ Committee. In the same year, in the first partially free parliamentary elections, the 1989 Polish parliamentary election, he was elected to the Sejm of the 10th term as a candidate for the Citizens’ Committee in the Nowa Huta constituency. During his term of office, he was a member of the Civic Parliamentary Club, served as deputy chair of the Special Committee for the Examination of Certain Legislative Initiatives, and was also a member of the Special Committee for the Examination of Draft Laws Relating to Economic Stabilisation and Systemic Changes, as well as the Committee on Foreign Economic Relations and Maritime Economy.

In 1989, he co-founded the Kraków Foundation for Social Communication and became a member of the Kraków Industrial Society. In the same year, he initiated the reactivation of the Kraków Chamber of Industry and Commerce. He served as its president from 1989 to 1994. From 1990 to 1991, he was deputy mayor of Kraków.

From 8 January 1992 to 2 February 1993, he served as Undersecretary of State at the Ministry of Industry and Trade. He drew up the guidelines for Poland’s industrial policy and was involved in developing sector-specific programmes, including those relating to shipbuilding, pharmaceuticals and heavy chemicals. Among other things, he negotiated investments by General Motors and Volkswagen in Poland. He was chairman of the government commission on the Wieliczka Salt Mine. From 18 November 1993 to 10 April 1995, he once again served as Undersecretary of State at the Ministry of Industry and Trade. During this period, he developed a concept for the creation of industrial parks in Poland, as well as a draft bill on special economic zones. Between 2000 and 2001, he served as Undersecretary of State at the Ministry of the Economy. He was responsible for the steel industry restructuring programme, including the consolidation of steelworks into the Polskie Huty Stali group.

He served as chairman and director of various companies, including Mielec Centrum (1995–1996), Jelcz (1996–1998), Zasada (1998–1999), as well as Vice-Chairman of the Management Board for Strategy and Development at the Tadeusz Sendzimir Steelworks in Kraków (2001–2002). In 2006, he was a member of the board of the Industrial Development Agency. He also served as chairman of the supervisory board of Kompania Węglowa. In April 2008, he took up the post of chairman of the Bumar holding company. He was dismissed from this position in March 2012.

Following the 2015 Polish parliamentary elections, he became involved in the activities of the Committee for the Defence of Democracy, criticising the Law and Justice government.

He was the initiator of the Solidarity Network Association, which promotes the ideals of ‘Solidarity’ and supports anti-communist opposition activists facing difficult life circumstances. In 2021, the Court of Appeal in Kraków awarded Edward Nowak compensation and damages for repression suffered during the communist era, totalling 442,000 zł.

== Awards and honours ==
- Officer's Cross of Polonia Restituta (for outstanding contributions to the cause of democratic change in Poland, and for achievements in his professional and community work, 2006)
- Knight's Cross of Polonia Restituta (2000)
- Cross of Freedom and Solidarity (2016)
- Bronze Cross of Merit (1978)
- "Unwavering in Word" Medal (2011)

== Bibliography ==
- Chmura, Sławomir (2010). "Nowak Edward Edmund". Encyklopedia „Solidarności”. Opozycja w PRL 1976–1989 (in Polish). Institute of National Remembrance. ISBN 978-83-7233-021-5.
- "Strona sejmowa posła X kadencji".
