= Michał Stachyra =

Polish game designer

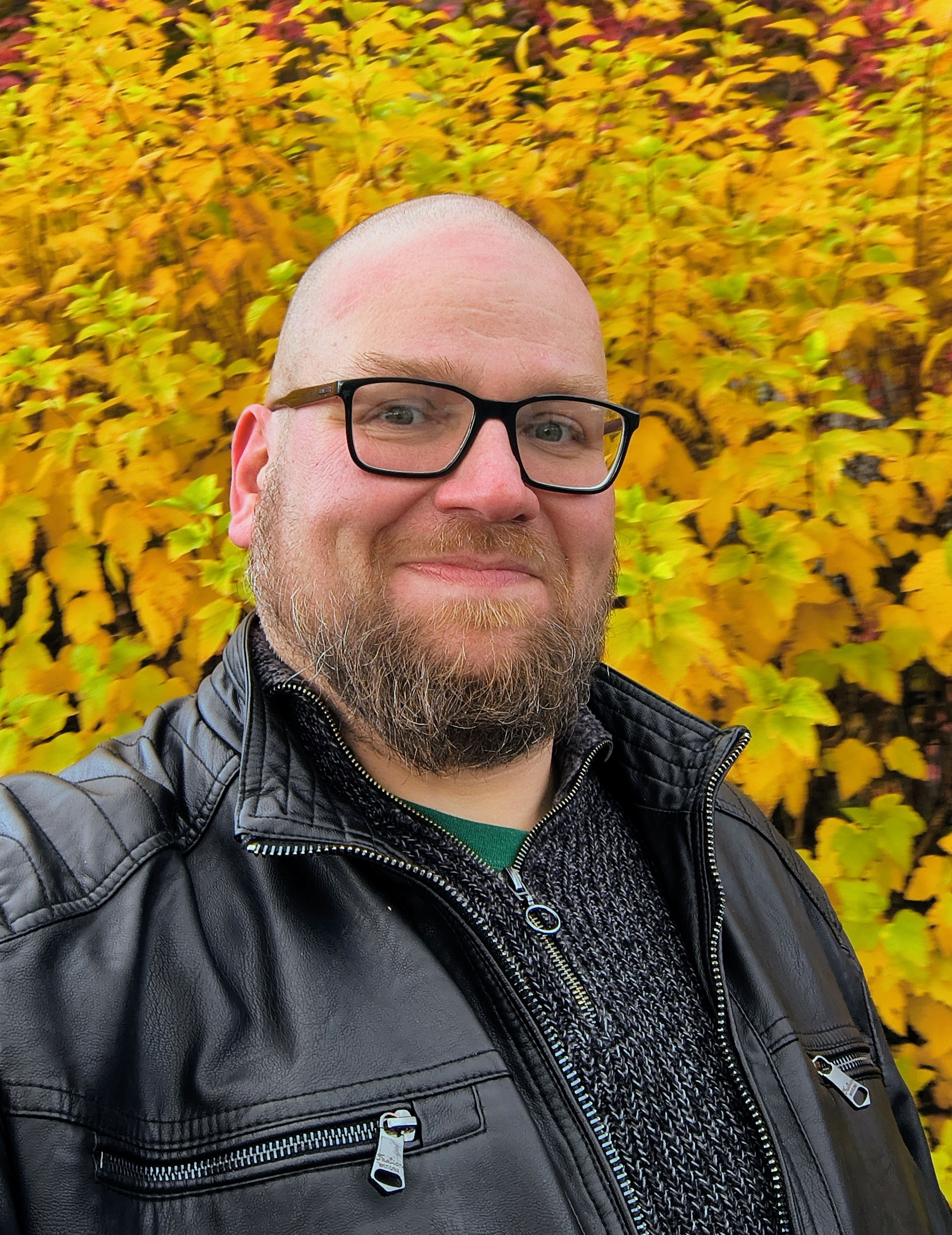
Michał Stachyra (2025)

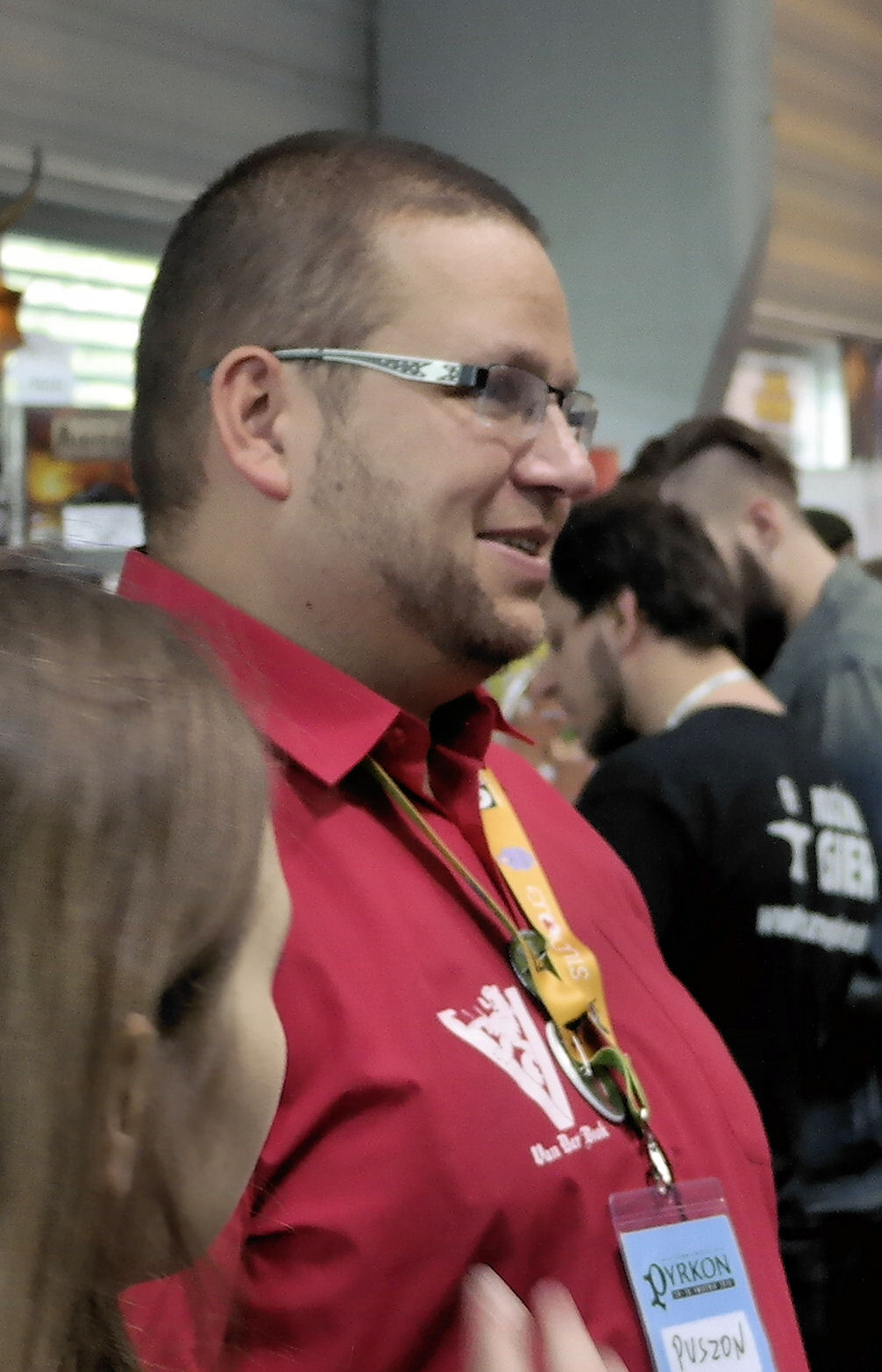
Michał Puszon Stachyra

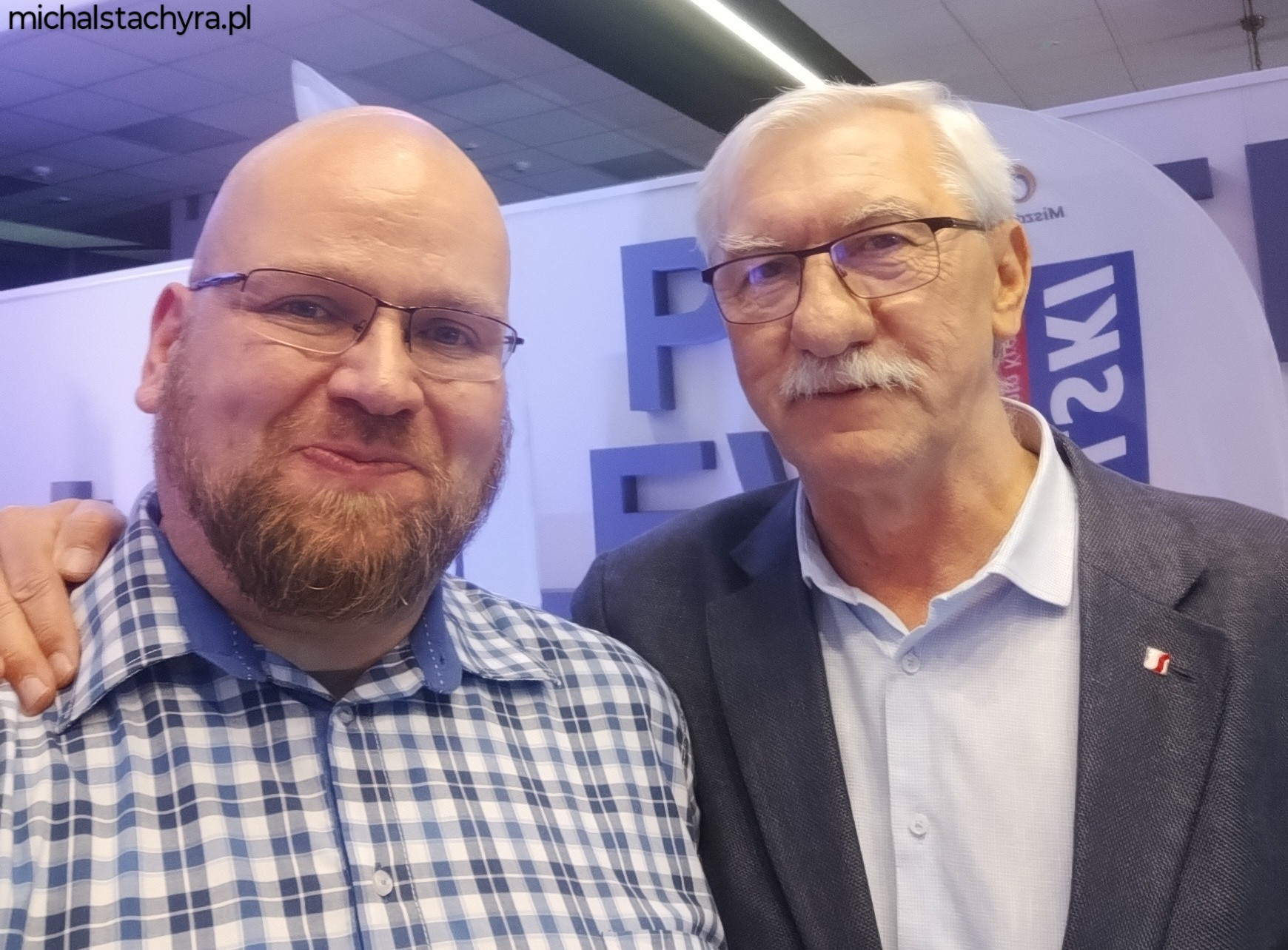
Michał Stachyra and Edward Nowak (Kraków 2024)

Michał Stachyra aka Puszon (born December 27, 1978, in Kraków, Poland) – polish game designer and publisher, owner of Kuźnia Gier publishing house.

He is author and publisher of RPG, boardgames and card games.

== RPG ==
Stachyra is co-author of:

- Wolsung: Steam Pulp Fantasy: main book and sourcebooks (2009-2015)
- The Witcher: Game of Imagination RPG sourcebook: Novigrad (2002) (set in The Witcher universe)
- Q-10 RPG system

He is an editor of Wolsung books and Polish versions of Savage Worlds, Adventurers and Grey Ranks.

== Board and card games ==
Michał Stachyra is an author of more than 20 board and card games: Aktywuj Warszawę, Erynie, Evolutio!, Fandoom, Gazociągi: Gra o inwestycje, Grunwald: Walka 600-lecia, Intryga 13th Street, Iwigilacja - gra towarzyska, Inwigilacja luksusowa, Kapitan Bomba, Kogeneracja, Kung Fu, Labirynt Czarnoksiężnika, Magiczna Warka, Na sygnale, Pirates 2ed: Governor's Daughter, Pioniersi, Polowanie na Trolla, Process legislacyjny - gra planszowa, Rice Wars, Ryzykanci: Koleje Fortuny, Troja, Tropem Dębowego Liścia, Veto, Veto: the Boardgame, Wiochmen Rejser, The Witcher card games Wiedźmin - Przygodowa Gra Karciana and the promotional Wiedźmin game included in the first computer game, Wolsung: the Boardgame, Wypas.

== Awards ==
Stachyra won Śląkfa Award (2009) and Identyfkatory Pyrkonu Award (2015)
