= Order of Makarios III =

Highest order of merit awarded by Cyprus

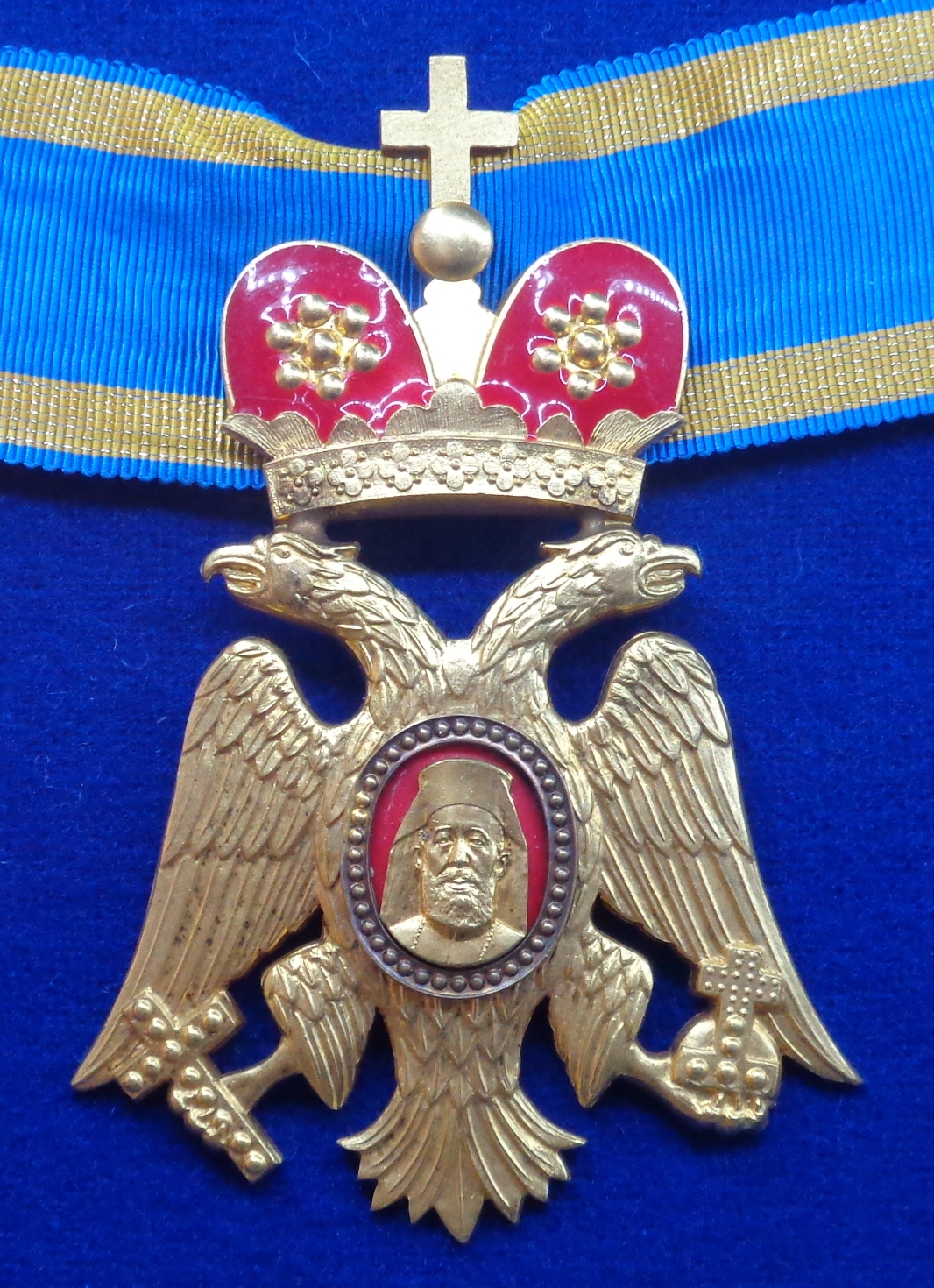
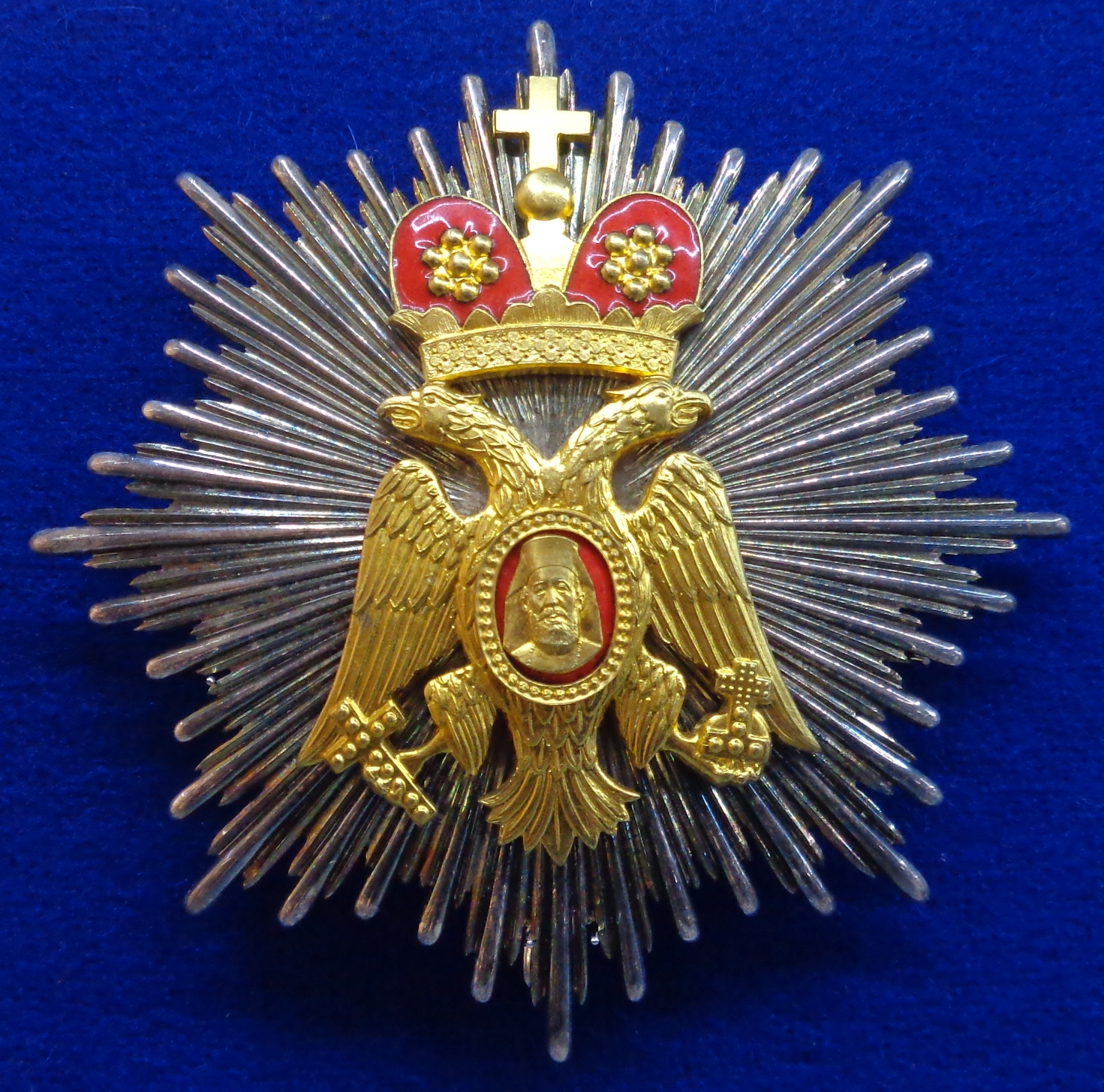
- Neck badge and breast star of Grand Commander
- Type: Order of knighthood
- Country: Cyprus
- Grandmaster: President of Cyprus
- Grades: Grand Collar; Grand Cross; Grand Commander; Commander; Officer; Knight

Precedence
- Next (higher): None
- Next (lower): Order of Merit of the Republic of Cyprus
- Ribbon of the order

The Order of Makarios III (Greek: Τάγμα Μακάριου Γ') is the senior order of knighthood awarded by Cyprus. Established in 1991, the order is named after the first President of Cyprus, Archbishop Makarios III.

== Grades ==
The Order of Makarios III is awarded in the following six grades:

- Grand Collar
- Grand Cross
- Grand Commander
- Commander
- Officer
- Knight

== Notable recipients ==
- King Abdullah II of Jordan (Grand Collar)
- King Birendra of Nepal (Grand Collar)
- Isaac Herzog, President of Israel (Grand Collar)
- Marcelo Rebelo de Sousa, President of Portugal (Grand Collar)
- Katerina Sakellaropoulou, President of Greece (Grand Collar)
- Frank-Walter Steinmeier, President of Germany (Grand Collar)
- Sergio Mattarella, President of Italy (Grand Collar)
- Pranab Mukherjee, President of India (Grand Collar)
- Willem-Alexander of the Netherlands, King of the Netherlands (Grand Collar)
- Queen Máxima of the Netherlands, Queen consort of the Netherlands (Grand Cross)
- Narendra Modi, Prime Minister of India (Grand Cross)
- John Brademas (Grand Cross)
- Sergey Lavrov (Grand Cross)
- Paul Sarbanes (Grand Cross)
- Bob Menendez (Grand Cross)
- Nassir Abdulaziz Al-Nasser (Grand Commander)
- Witold Dzielski (Commander)
- Vyron Polydoras (Officer)
- Dimitris Avramopoulos (Knight)

== See also ==
- Archbishop Makarios III
- President of Cyprus
