= Witold Dzielski =

Polish politician

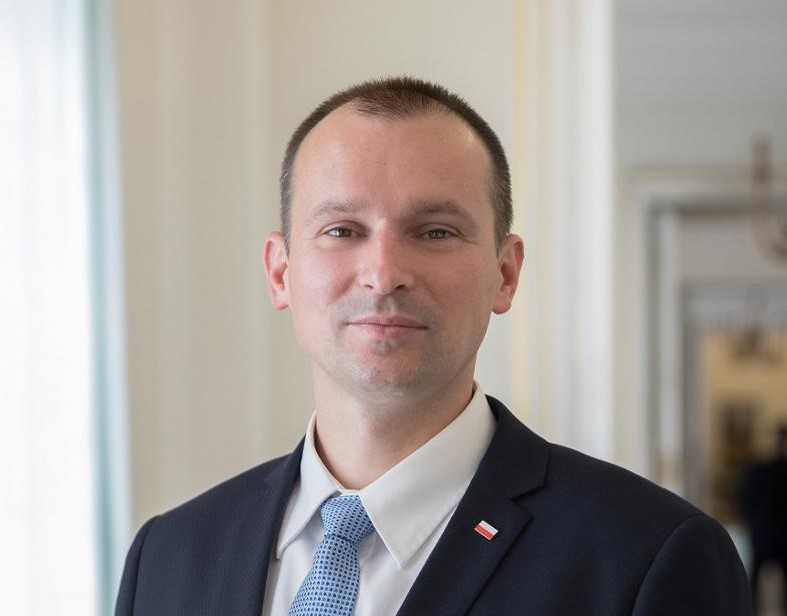

Poland Ambassador to Canada
- In office 28 April 2022 – 2026
- Preceded by: Andrzej Kurnicki

Personal details
- Born: 21 July 1977 (age 49) Kraków, Poland
- Spouse: Anna Maria Dzielska
- Children: 2
- Parents: Maria Dzielska; Mirosław Dzielski
- Education: Jagiellonian University; University of Warsaw
- Profession: Official, diplomat, teacher

Witold Mirosław Dzielski (born 21 July 1977, Kraków, Poland) is a Polish official who served as an ambassador to Canada from 2022 to 2026.

== Education and career ==
Dzielski attended school in Washington, D.C. He graduated from the Language Teachers' Training College, Jagiellonian University, and American studies at the University of Warsaw. He was studying also at the University of Notre Dame, Indiana.

From 1999 to 2007 Dzielski worked as a lecturer and English teacher at the Jagiellonian University, the School of Banking and Management, the High School of Fine Arts in Kraków. Between 2007 and 2012 he served as II and I Secretary at the Embassy of Poland, Washington, D.C., being responsible for EU-US relations as well as Polish-Jewish affairs. Afterwards, from 2013 to 2015 he worked at the Department of the Americas, Ministry of Foreign Affairs. In 2015, he was responsible for the foreign activities of the President of Poland as the Director of the Bureau of International Policy at the Chancellery of the President of the Republic of Poland. On 17 March 2022, he was nominated Poland Ambassador to Canada. On 28 April 2022, he took office. He ended his mission in 2026.

Prior to joining the public service, Dzielski was engaged in Poland's civic society organizations; he was president and founder of the US Matters Association, Office Director at the Pro Publico Bono Foundation, public relations representative for the Oswiecim Institute of Human Rights.

== Private life ==
Son of Mirosław Dzielski, philosopher, and Maria Dzielska, classical philologist. Married to Anna Maria Dzielska and has two sons.

Dzielski practices Aikido (black belt) and basketball (formerly long time team captain). Besides Polish, he speaks English, German and basic French.

== Honours ==
- Commander of the Order of the Lion of Finland, Finland (2017)
- Commander of the Order of the Star of Romania, Romania (2019)
- Commander of the Order of Makarios III, Cyprus (2021)
- Knight of the Order of Polonia Restituta, Poland (2022)

== Works ==
- Dzielski, Witold; Michnik, Wojciech (2007). Irak : dylematy amerykańskiej interwencji (in Polish). Kraków: Księgarnia Akademicka. ISBN 978-83-7188-995-0.
- Dzielski, Witold (2014). Hum'Ha Ostatni (in Polish). Konin: Wydawnictwo Psychoskok. ISBN 978-83-7900-190-3.
