= Maria Dzielska =

Polish classical philologist, historian, translator and political activist (1942-2018)

Prof. Maria Celina Dzielska
- Born: Maria Celina Dąbrowska; 18 September 1942; Kraków, Poland
- Died: 30 July 2018 (aged 75); Kraków, Poland
- Occupations: Philologist; historian; translator; political activist
- Spouse: Mirosław Dzielski
- Children: Witold Dzielski
- Awards: Order of the White Eagle

Academic background
- Education: University of Łódź
- Thesis: (1972)

Academic work
- Institutions: Jagiellonian University

Maria Celina Dzielska (née Dąbrowska, 18 September 1942 – 30 July 2018) was a Polish classical philologist, historian, translator, biographer of Hypatia and political activist. She was a Professor of Ancient Roman History at Jagiellonian University.

== Education and career ==
Dzielska was born in Kraków on 18 September 1942. She earned degrees in history from the Jagiellonian University and in classical philology from the University of Łódź, completing her Ph.D. in 1972 and her habilitation in 1984. She was promoted to full professor at Jagiellonian University in 1996.

She translated the work of Pseudo-Dionysius the Areopagite. She is one of the most translated Polish historians of all time. Her book Hypatia of Alexandria, published in the USA in 1995 by the University of Harvard, was translated into 8 languages and named the best academic book of the year in the category 'Philosophy' by Choice Magazine as well as, the best history book of 1995 by American History Book Club.

She was posthumously awarded by the President of the Republic of Poland with the Order of the White Eagle in recognition of her outstanding services in popularizing cultural heritage and historical knowledge, for outstanding achievements in scientific and research work, and for public activity. A year later, she was also awarded the Cross of Freedom and Solidarity for merits in activities for the independence and sovereignty of Poland and respect for human rights in the Polish People's Republic.

== Private life ==
Dzielska married Mirosław Dzielski, a leader of the 1980s anti-communist movement in Poland, and campaigned with him against communism. She was mother to Witold Dzielski.

== Recognition ==
Dzielska was a member of the Polish Academy of Sciences and the Polish Academy of Learning. Upon her death she was given a state funeral at which Polish president Andrzej Duda awarded her the Order of the White Eagle.

== Selected publications ==
- Apollonius of Tyana in Legend and History (translated into English by Piotr Pieńkowski; Rome: l'Erma di Bretschneider, 1986)
- Hypatia of Alexandria (translated into English by F. Lyra; Cambridge: Harvard Univ. Press, 1995)
- Divine Men and Women in the History and Society of Late Hellenism (edited with Kamilla Twardowska, Jagiellonian University Press, 2013)
