= Orders, decorations, and medals of Cyprus =

Orders, decorations, and medals of the Republic of Cyprus include:

- Order of Makarios III
- Order of Merit of the Republic of Cyprus
