= Rashtriya Samajwadi Congress =

- Founder: Pranab Mukherjee
- Founded: 1986
- Dissolved: 1989
- Split from: Indian National Congress
- Merged into: Indian National Congress
- Political position: Centre-left
- Colours: Blue
- Alliance: Congress+ (1986-1989)
- Seats in Rajya Sabha: 0
- Seats in Lok Sabha: 0
- Seats in: 0

Rashtriya Samajwadi Congress (RSC; transl. National Socialist Congress) was a political party in the Indian state of West Bengal from 1986 to 1989. RSC was founded by Indian National Congress leader Pranab Mukherjee, who was to become the President of India, as a result of the leadership struggle within the Indian National Congress after the demise of Indira Gandhi. Mukherjee was opposed to Rajiv Gandhi being appointed the Prime Minister of India, seeing himself as the rightful successor to the post due to his seniority within the party and being opposed to the dynastic nature of the transition.

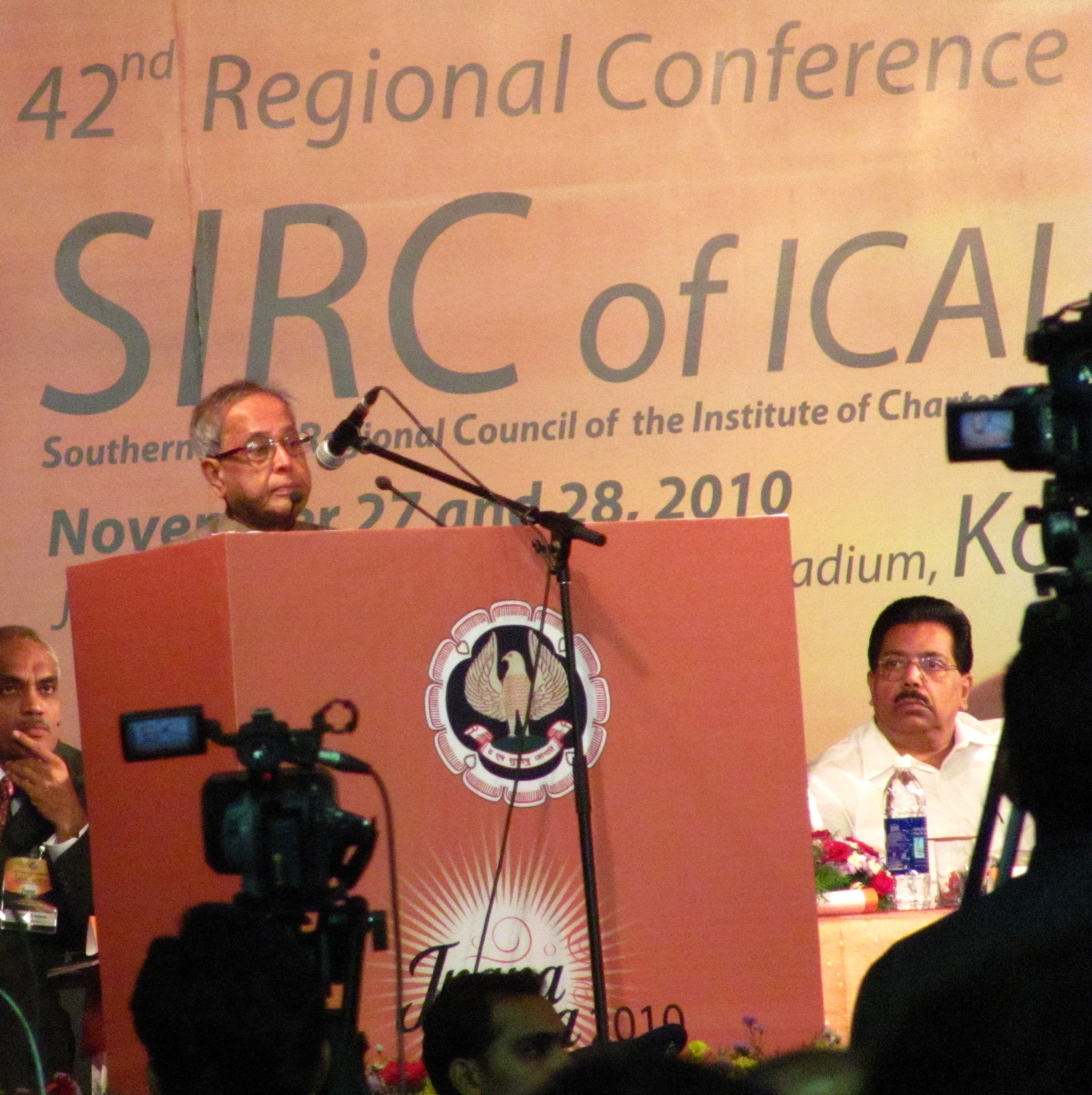
President of India Pranab Mukherjee, then the Finance Minister of India, at Regional Conference of Institute of Chartered Accountants of India

The RSC rejoined the INC in 1989 after it was unsuccessful in attracting major political figures to its fold and its inability in garnering wide support. This may have been due to Mukherjee not being a mass leader and never having contested elections. On his return to Congress he was welcomed and again joined the top leadership, building up an image of a Nehru–Gandhi family loyalist, culminating in his election to the Presidency on a Congress ticket.

== See also ==
- Indian National Congress breakaway parties

== Notes ==
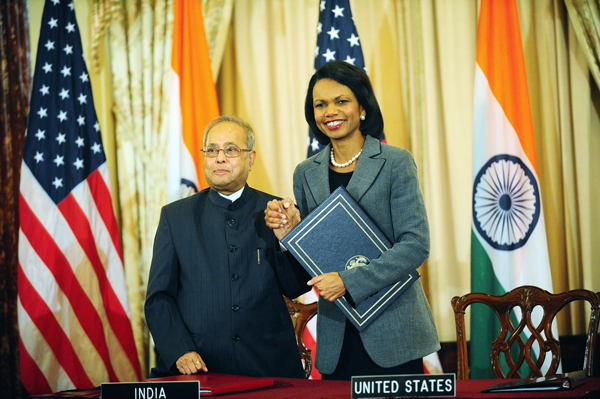
Mukherjee with then-United States Secretary of State Condoleezza Rice
