= Mirati =

Mirati Mirity
- Village
- Location in West Bengal, India Mirati (India)
- Coordinates: 23.791467°N 87.878567°E
- Country: India
- State: West Bengal
- District: Birbhum

Population (2011)
  - Total: 1,098

Languages
  - Official: Bengali, English
- Time zone: UTC+5:30 (IST)
- Telephone/STD code: 03462
- Lok Sabha constituency: Bolpur
- Vidhan Sabha constituency: Labpur
- Website: birbhum.nic.in

Mirati (also spelled Mirity) is a village located in Labpur CD Block in Bolpur subdivision of Birbhum district of the Indian state of West Bengal. The village shot to prominence after the election of Pranab Mukherjee as the President of India in July 2012 as he was born in the village.

== Geography ==
This village is approximately 40 km from the city of Bolpur and 5 km from small town of Kirnahar where Pranab Mukherjee studied in his childhood days. Pranab Mukherjee was a student of Kirnahar Shib Chandra School.

== Pranab Mukherjee ==
Pranab Mukherjee, 13th President of India, 2012-2017, was born on 11 December 1935 and spent his childhood at Mirati.

== Demographics ==
As per the 2011 Census of India, Mirity had a total population of 1,098 of which 577 (53%) were males and 521 (47%) were females. Population below 6 years was 106. The total number of literates in Mirity was 686 (69.15% of the population over 6 years).
