= Andrzej Kurnicki =

Polish politician

Andrzej Kurnicki Ph.D.
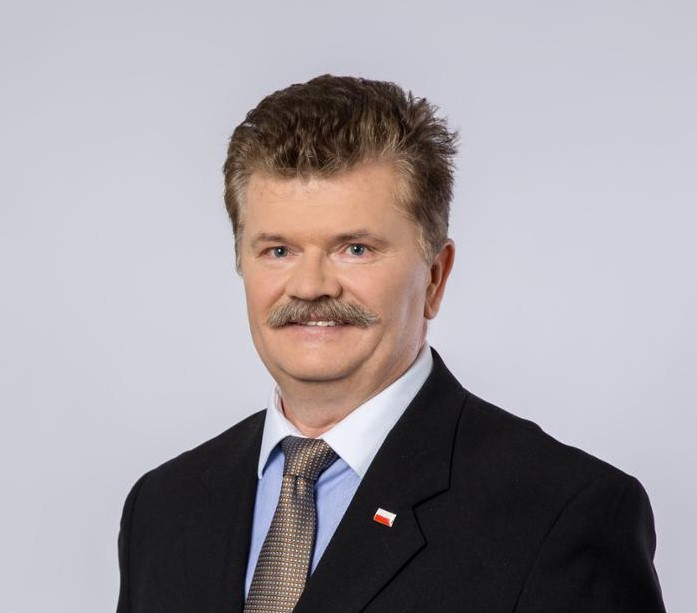

Poland Ambassador to Canada
- In office June 2017 – 31 March 2022
- Preceded by: Marcin Bosacki
- Succeeded by: Witold Dzielski

Personal details
- Born: 1958 (age 67–68)
- Education: University of Warsaw; Johns Hopkins University
- Profession: economist, diplomat

Andrzej Kurnicki (born 1958) is a Polish economist. Between 2017 and 2022 Kurnicki served as Polish ambassador to Canada. Kurnicki holds a Ph.D. in economics.
