= Pranab Mukherjee =

President of India from 2012 to 2017

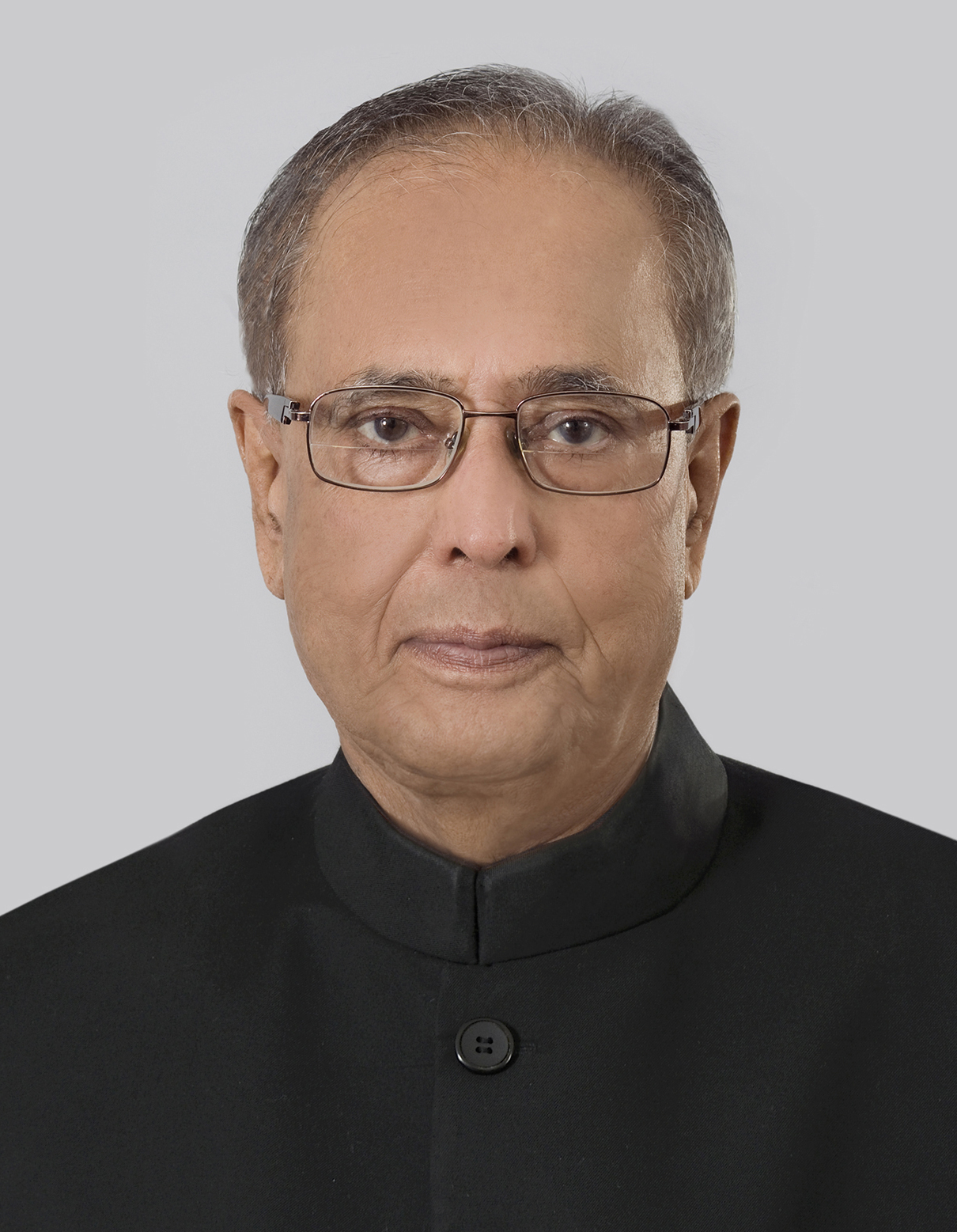
- Official portrait, 2012

President of India
- In office 25 July 2012 – 25 July 2017
- Prime Minister: Manmohan Singh; Narendra Modi
- Vice President: Mohammad Hamid Ansari
- Preceded by: Pratibha Patil
- Succeeded by: Ram Nath Kovind

Union Minister of Finance
- In office 24 January 2009 – 26 June 2012
- Prime Minister: Manmohan Singh
- Preceded by: Manmohan Singh
- Succeeded by: Manmohan Singh
- In office 5 January 1982 – 31 December 1984
- Prime Minister: Indira Gandhi; Rajiv Gandhi
- Preceded by: R. Venkataraman
- Succeeded by: Vishwanath Pratap Singh

Union Minister of Defence
- In office 22 May 2004 – 26 October 2006
- Prime Minister: Manmohan Singh
- Preceded by: George Fernandes
- Succeeded by: A. K. Antony

Union Minister of External Affairs
- In office 24 October 2006 – 22 May 2009
- Prime Minister: Manmohan Singh
- Preceded by: Manmohan Singh (acting)
- Succeeded by: S. M. Krishna
- In office 10 February 1995 – 16 May 1996
- Prime Minister: P. V. Narasimha Rao
- Preceded by: Dinesh Singh
- Succeeded by: Sikander Bakht

Leader of the House in Lok Sabha
- In office 22 May 2004 – 26 June 2012
- Preceded by: Atal Bihari Vajpayee
- Succeeded by: Sushilkumar Shinde

Deputy Chairman of the Planning Commission
- In office 24 June 1991 – 15 May 1996
- Prime Minister: P. V. Narasimha Rao
- Preceded by: Mohan Dharia
- Succeeded by: Madhu Dandavate

Leader of the House in Rajya Sabha
- In office January 1980 – 31 December 1984
- Preceded by: K. C. Pant
- Succeeded by: Vishwanath Pratap Singh

Member of Parliament, Lok Sabha
- In office 10 May 2004 – 26 June 2012
- Preceded by: Abul Hasnat Khan
- Succeeded by: Abhijit Mukherjee
- Constituency: Jangipur, West Bengal

Member of Parliament, Rajya Sabha
- In office 10 July 1969 – 10 July 1981
- Constituency: West Bengal
- In office 14 August 1981 – 13 August 1987
- Constituency: Gujarat

Union Minister Of Steel and Mines
- In office 16 January 1980 - 15 January 1982
- Preceded by: Biju Patnaik
- Succeeded by: N. D. Tiwari

Personal details
- Born: 11 December 1935 Mirati, Bengal Presidency, British India (present-day West Bengal, India)
- Died: 31 August 2020 (aged 84) New Delhi, Delhi, India
- Cause of death: COVID-19
- Party: Indian National Congress (1972–1986; 1989–2020)
- Other political affiliations: Bangla Congress (1967–1972); Rashtriya Samajwadi Congress (1986–1989)
- Spouse: Suvra Mukherjee (m. 1957; died 2015)
- Children: 3 (including Sharmistha and Abhijit)
- Education: University of Calcutta (BA, MA, LLB)
- Awards: See below
- Website: pranabmukherjee.nic.in (defunct)
- Nicknames: Pranab Da; Poltuda

Pranab Mukherjee (Bengali: Praṇaba Kumāra Mukhārjī, pronounced [pɾɔnob kumaɾ mukʰaɾʤi] ; 11 December 1935 – 31 August 2020) was an Indian politician who served as the president of India from 2012 until 2017. He was the first person from West Bengal to hold the office. In a political career spanning five decades, Mukherjee was a senior leader in the Indian National Congress and occupied several top ministerial portfolios in the Government of India. Prior to his election as President, Mukherjee was Finance Minister from 2009 to 2012 also in 1982 to 1984. He was awarded India's highest civilian honour, the Bharat Ratna, in 2019, by his successor as president, Ram Nath Kovind.

Mukherjee entered national politics in 1969, when Prime Minister, Indira Gandhi, helped him get elected to the Rajya Sabha, the upper house of the Parliament of India. He became one of Gandhi's most trusted lieutenants and a minister in her cabinet in 1973. Mukherjee's service in a number of ministerial capacities culminated in his first stint as Finance Minister of India from 1982 to 1984. He was also the Leader of the House in the Rajya Sabha from 1980 to 1985.

After being dropped from the cabinet by Prime Minister, Rajiv Gandhi, in 1986, Mukherjee formed his own party, the Rashtriya Samajwadi Congress, which merged with the Congress in 1989 after his reconciliation with the party's top leadership. Prime Minister, P. V. Narasimha Rao, appointed him as the head of the Planning Commission in 1991 and as the foreign minister in 1995. Mukherjee supported Sonia Gandhi's candidacy and election as the President of the Indian National Congress in 1998.

When the Congress-led United Progressive Alliance (UPA) came to power in 2004, Mukherjee was elected to the Lok Sabha, the popularly elected lower house of Parliament, for the first time. From then until his resignation in 2012, he held a number of key cabinet portfolios in Prime Minister Manmohan Singh's government – Defence (2004–06), External Affairs (2006–09), and Finance (2009–12) – apart from heading several Groups of Ministers (GoMs) and being Leader of the House in the Lok Sabha. After securing the UPA's nomination for the country's presidency in July 2012, Mukherjee comfortably defeated P. A. Sangma of NDA in the 2012 Indian presidential election, winning 70 per cent of the electoral-college vote.

In 2017, Mukherjee decided not to run for re-election and to retire from politics after leaving the presidency due to "health complications relating to old age." His term expired on 25 July 2017. He was succeeded as president by Ram Nath Kovind. In June 2018, Mukherjee became the first former President of India to address a Rashtriya Swayamsevak Sangh (RSS) event.

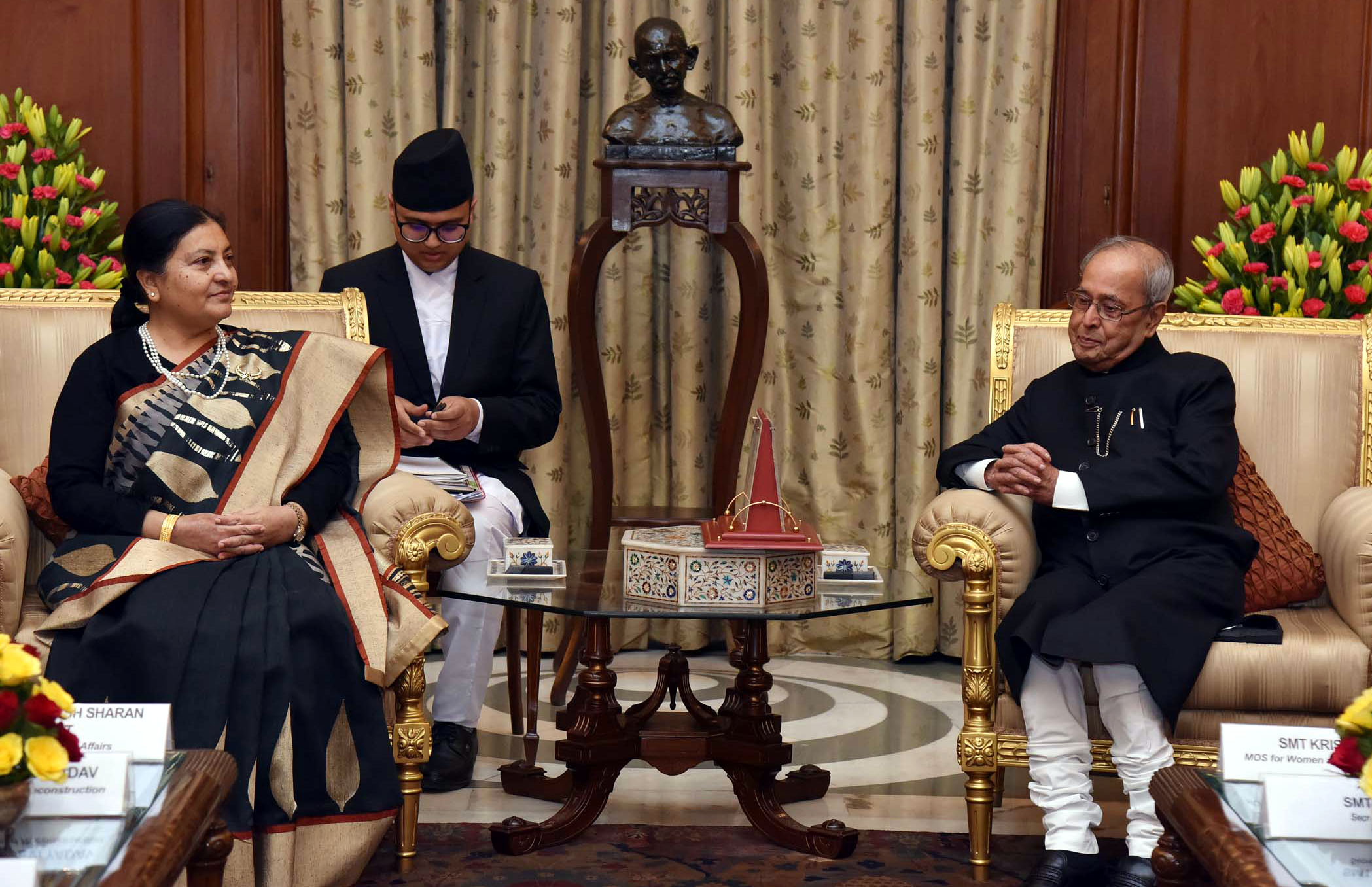
Mukherjee with President of Nepal Bidya Devi Bhandari

== Early life and education ==
Pranab Mukherjee was born on 11 December 1935 during the British Colonial rule, into a Bengali Brahmin family in Mirati, a village in the Bengal Presidency (now in Birbhum district, West Bengal). His father, Kamada Kinkar Mukherjee, was active participant in the Indian independence movement and was a member of the West Bengal Legislative Council between 1952 and 1964 as a representative of the Indian National Congress; he was also a member of AICC. His mother was Rajlakshmi Mukherjee. He had two siblings: older sister Annapurna Banarjee (1928–2020) and older brother Piyush Mukherjee (1931–2017).

Mukherjee attended Suri Vidyasagar College in Suri (Birbhum), which was then affiliated to the University of Calcutta. He subsequently earned an MA degree in political science and history and an LL.B. degree, both from the University of Calcutta

In 1957, Mukherjee had begun his career as a teacher in the school, Mahendra Nath Ray institute at Tajpur, near Amta in Howrah. Subsequently, he was an upper-division Clerk in the Office of the Deputy Accountant-General (Post and Telegraph) in Calcutta. In 1963, he became a lecturer (Assistant Professor) of Political Science at Vidyanagar College, affiliated to the University of Calcutta and he also worked as a journalist at Desher Dak (Call of the Motherland) before entering politics.

== Political career ==
Mukherjee started his political career in 1967 as a founding member of the Bangla Congress. Ahead of the 1967 election, he played a crucial role in forging the United Front alliance against the Indian National Congress. In 1969, he managed the successful Midnapore by-election campaign of an independent candidate, V. K. Krishna Menon. He became a member of the Rajya Sabha (the upper house of Indian parliament) in July 1969 on a Bangla Congress ticket. Mukherjee soon became the medium of exchanging confidential notes between Indira Gandhi and Ajoy Mukherjee. In 1972, Indira Gandhi recruited him to the Indian National Congress along with merging the Bangla Congress into the party. Mukherjee was re-elected to the house in 1975, 1981, 1993, and 1999.

Mukherjee gained a reputation as Indira Gandhi's loyalist and was often described as her "man for all seasons." He rose rapidly through the ranks of Congress leaders and was appointed Union Deputy Minister of Industrial Development in Indira Gandhi's cabinet in 1973. He was active in the Indian cabinet during the controversial Internal Emergency of 1975–77. Ruling Congress politicians of the day including Mukherjee were accused of using extra-constitutional powers to "wreck established norms and rules of governance". Following Congress's defeat in the 1977 general elections, the newly formed Janata government-appointed Shah Commission indicted Mukherjee; however, the commission was itself indicted in 1979 for stepping "outside its jurisdiction".

Mukherjee emerged unscathed and rose through a series of ranks and cabinet posts. In 1979, Mukherjee became the Deputy Leader of the Indian National Congress in the Rajya Sabha, and in 1980, he was appointed Leader of the House. He was considered the top-ranking Indian cabinet minister and he presided over cabinet meetings in the absence of the Prime Minister. He was the Finance Minister from 1982 to 1984. His term was noted for his work in improving the finances of the government, which enabled Gandhi to score a political point by returning the last instalment of India's first IMF loan. As Finance Minister, Mukherjee signed the letter appointing Manmohan Singh as Governor of the Reserve Bank of India.

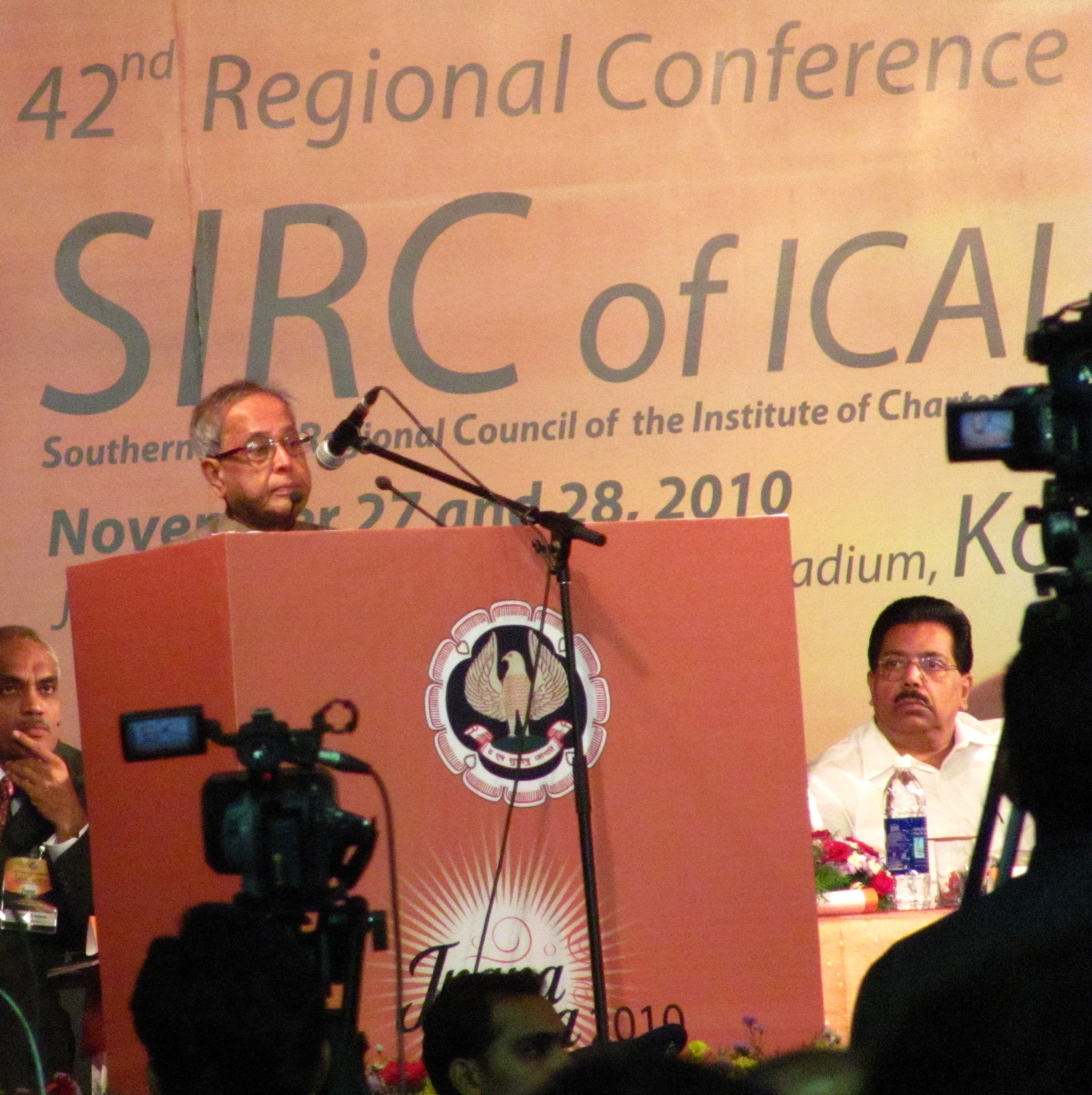
Pranab Mukherjee addresses delegates of the 42nd Regional Conference of SIRC, the Institute of Chartered Accountants of India.

Mukherjee was sidelined from the INC following the assassination of Indira Gandhi. Although he was much more experienced in politics than Indira's son, Rajiv Gandhi, it was Rajiv who gained control. Mukherjee lost his position in the cabinet and was sent to manage the regional West Bengal Pradesh Congress Committee. He was considered to be Indira's likely successor and, siding with those within his party who aligned themselves against Rajiv Gandhi, Mukherjee was sidelined and eventually expelled from the mainstream.

In 1986, Mukherjee founded another party, the Rashtriya Samajwadi Congress (RSC), in West Bengal. The RSC and INC merged three years later after a compromise was reached with Rajiv Gandhi. The RSC had fared terribly in the 1987 Assembly polls in West Bengal. Many analysts, over the years, have attributed the muting of Mukherjee's political aspirations as the supreme leader to his inability to emerge as a magnetic mass leader. On later being asked whether he ever desired to become Prime Minister, Mukherjee replied, "7 RCR was never my destination." Zee News noted: "The statement assumes heft in the light of the longstanding speculation that Mukherjee, as one of the doyens of Congress, always nursed an ambition to occupy the top executive post".

Mukherjee's political career revived following the Assassination of Rajiv Gandhi in 1991, when P. V. Narasimha Rao chose to appoint him as deputy chairman of the Indian Planning Commission and subsequently as a union cabinet minister. He served as External Affairs Minister from 1995 to 1996 in Rao's cabinet.

Mukherjee was considered to be a Gandhi family loyalist and the principal architect of Sonia Gandhi's entry into politics, a mentoring responsibility he was believed to have continued shouldering. He was made General Secretary of the AICC in 1998–99 after Sonia Gandhi became Congress President. Mukherjee was made President of the West Bengal Congress in 2000 and held the position until his resignation in 2008. He had earlier held the position in 1985.

Mukherjee became Leader of the House in the Lok Sabha in 2004. He contested and won a Lok Sabha seat from Jangipur in West Bengal, which he would later retain in 2009. It was speculated in 2004 that Mukherjee would be made Prime Minister of India after Sonia Gandhi declined to become Prime Minister; however, Manmohan Singh was chosen instead.

Mukherjee was briefly considered for the post of the largely ceremonial Indian presidency in 2007, but his name was subsequently dropped after his contribution to the Union Cabinet was considered practically indispensable. He held many important posts in the Manmohan Singh government: He had the distinction of being the minister for various high-profile ministries, including Defence, Finance, and External Affairs. Apart from being Leader of the House in the Lok Sabha and Bengal Pradesh Congress Committee President, he also headed the Congress Parliamentary Party and the Congress Legislative Party, which consist of all the Congress MP's and MLA's in the country.

Mukherjee ended his affiliation with the Indian National Congress and retired from active political life following his election as president in 2012. The Economic Times had noted: "[the] decades of activity in critical all-rounder roles make [Mukherjee's] exit both a structural and generation shift. With him, the last of the Congress triumvirate – along with Rao and R. Venkataraman – who formed the core team of Indira/Rajiv regimes bows out. While Rao became PM, Pranab's political marathon too ends where Venkataraman's did, at the Rashtrapati Bhavan".

=== Political party role ===
Mukherjee was "very well respected within the party social circles". Media accounts describe him as having "a reputation as a number-crunching politician with a phenomenal memory and an unerring survival instinct".

He became a member of the Congress Working Committee on 27 January 1978. He also became a member of the Central Parliamentary Board of the All India Congress Committee (AICC) that year. Mukherjee briefly held the position of treasurer of the AICC and the Congress party in 1978.

He was appointed chairman of the Campaign Committee of the AICC for conducting National Elections to Parliament in 1984, 1991, 1996, and 1998. He was chairman of the Central Election Coordination Committee of the AICC from 28 June 1999 to 2012. He was appointed to the Central Election Committee on 12 December 2001. Mukherjee was appointed General Secretary of the AICC in 1998. In 1997, he was voted Outstanding Parliamentarian by the Indian Parliamentary Group.

After Sonia Gandhi reluctantly agreed to join politics, Mukherjee was one of her mentors, guiding her through difficult situations with examples of how her mother-in-law, Indira Gandhi, would have done things. His talents were on display during the negotiations for the Patents Amendment Bill in early 2005. Congress was committed to passing an IP bill, but their allies in the United Progressive Alliance from the Left front had a long tradition of opposing some of the monopoly aspects of intellectual property. Mukherjee, as Defence Minister, was not formally involved but was roped in for his negotiation skills. He drew on many old allies including the CPI-M leader Jyoti Basu (former Chief Minister of West Bengal), and formed new intermediary positions, which included product patents. Then, he had to convince his own colleagues, including commerce minister Kamal Nath, who at one point said..."An imperfect legislation is better than no legislation". Finally, on 23 March 2005, the bill was approved.

India Today wrote that Mukherjee's role in "skillfully pushing through the historic 123 Agreement and treaty with the Nuclear Suppliers Group" may have saved the UPA-II government from the 2008 motion of no confidence.

Mukherjee played a crucial role in steering the Cabinet pre-Lok Sabha elections when Prime Minister Manmohan Singh underwent a heart bypass surgery in 2008–09 by taking additional charges as chairman of the Cabinet Committee of Political Affairs and Union Minister in the Finance Ministry despite already being Union Minister of External Affairs.

Mukherjee's political skills and long experience in government have also led him to head a large number of committees of ministers in the government. At the time of his resignation, on being nominated as the UPA's presidential candidate, Mukherjee was heading several Groups of Ministers (GoMs) and Empowered Groups of Ministers (EGoMs).

== Union Cabinet Minister ==
=== Minister of Defence ===
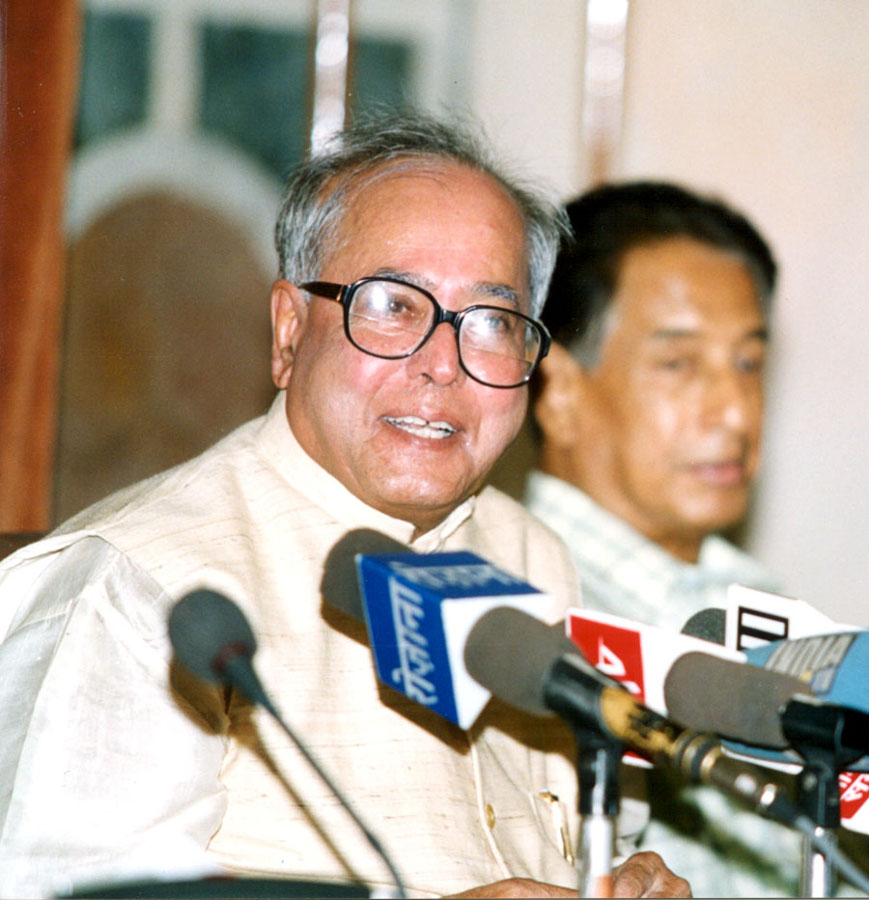
Mukherjee in 2004

Manmohan Singh appointed Mukherjee as the Minister of Defence of India when the Congress Party once again came to power in 2004. Mukherjee held the post until 2006. He expanded cooperation with the United States during his tenure. The Times of India reported on the United States diplomatic cables leak release and noted how the U.S. was full of praise for the "uniformed leadership" of Indian armed forces. In June 2005, Mukherjee inked the ten-year Indo-US Defence Framework deal.

Despite increasing co-operation with the United States, Mukherjee maintained that Russia would remain India's 'topmost' defence partner. He asserted that "Russia has been and will remain India's largest defence partner in the years to come" while inaugurating the 5th session of the Indo-Russian Inter-Governmental Commission on Military-Technical Cooperation (IRIGC-MTC) in Moscow in 2005.

Russia and India held their first joint anti-terror war games in Rajasthan in October 2005, during which Mukherjee and Russian Defence Minister Sergei Ivanov narrowly escaped injury after a heavy mortar landed several metres from their platform. The Russian ministry subsequently declared its hopes to follow up joint military exercises in India with further joint exercises on Russian territory.

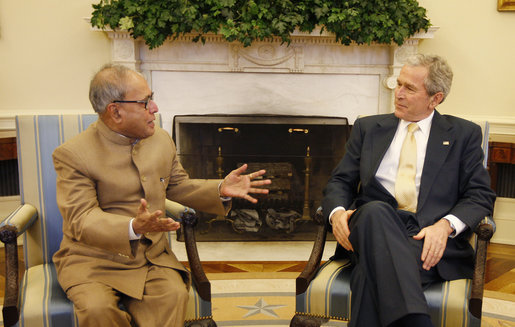
External Affairs Minister Pranab Mukherjee with US President George W. Bush in 2008

=== Minister of External Affairs ===
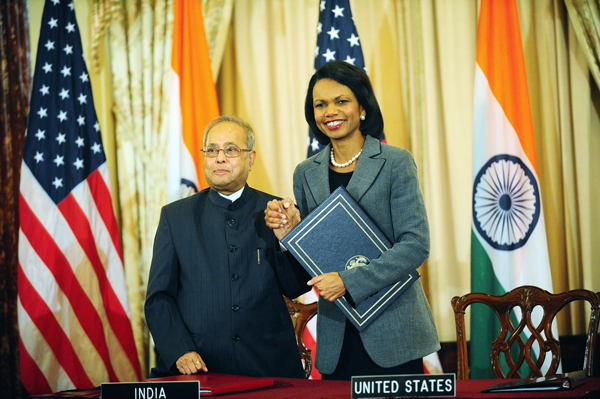
External Affairs Minister Pranab Mukherjee with Secretary Condoleezza Rice after signing the India–United States Civil Nuclear Agreement

Mukherjee was appointed External Affairs Minister of India in 1995. Under his leadership, India was made "Full Dialogue Partner" of ASEAN as part of the Look East foreign policy initiated by Narasimha Rao. Mukherjee left the position in 1996.

His second term began in 2006. He oversaw the successful signing of the U.S.-India Civil Nuclear Agreement with the U.S. government and then with the Nuclear Suppliers Group, allowing India to participate in civilian nuclear trade in spite of not having signed the Nuclear Non-Proliferation Treaty. Mukherjee played a crucial role in mobilising world opinion against Pakistan after the 2008 Mumbai attacks. He left the position a year later to take over the Finance Ministry of India.

When asked what legacy he wanted to leave behind as Foreign Minister of India, Mukherjee replied, "As the [man] who prepared Indian diplomacy to address the challenges of a more globalised, interdependent and uncertain world".

=== Minister of Commerce and Industry ===
Mukherjee thrice served as Commerce Minister of India. His first stints were in the Indira Gandhi government from 1980 to 1982 and again in 1984. His third stint in the 1990s saw him contribute significantly to the negotiations which led to the establishment of the World Trade Organization.

=== Minister of Finance ===
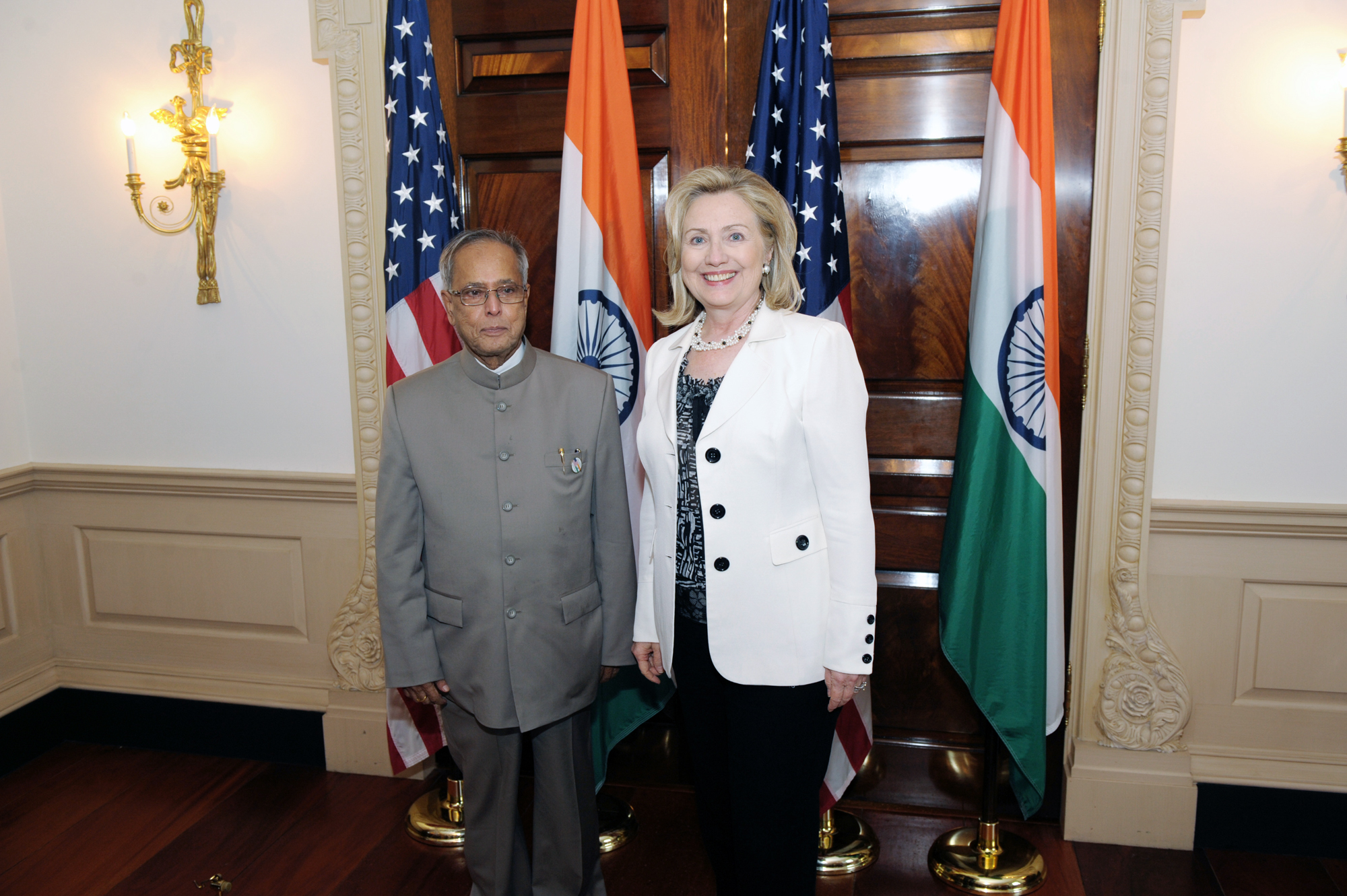
Finance Minister Pranab Mukherjee with United States Secretary of State Hillary Clinton in Washington, D.C., 2011

Mukherjee's first stint as the Finance Minister of India was during the Indira Gandhi government in 1982. He presented his first annual budget in 1982–83. His first term was noted for the work he did to improve the finances of the government and for successfully returning the last instalment of India's first IMF loan. Mukherjee signed the letter appointing Manmohan Singh as the Governor of the Reserve Bank of India in 1982. He was accused of patronage practices in the Ambani–Wadia industrial feuds.

Mukherjee was credited with being an early reformer of the Indian economy. India Today wrote: "Operation Forward, which [Mukherjee] and then Industries Minister Charanjit Chanana launched in the early 1980s, started the liberalisation process that flowered under Rao and Manmohan Singh". A Left-wing magazine once commented that "socialism did not grow out of the pipe Mukherjee smoked".

Mukherjee was removed from his position as Finance Minister by Rajiv Gandhi in 1984. Gandhi had wished to bring in his own team of staff to govern India. Mukherjee was replaced even though he was rated as the best Finance Minister in the World that year according to a survey by Euromoney magazine.

He returned to handling the finances of India during the premiership of Narasimha Rao, after being appointed Deputy Chairman of the Planning Commission. During Mukherjee's tenure of 1991 to 1996, Manmohan Singh as Finance Minister oversaw many economic reforms to end the Licence Raj system and help open the Indian economy.

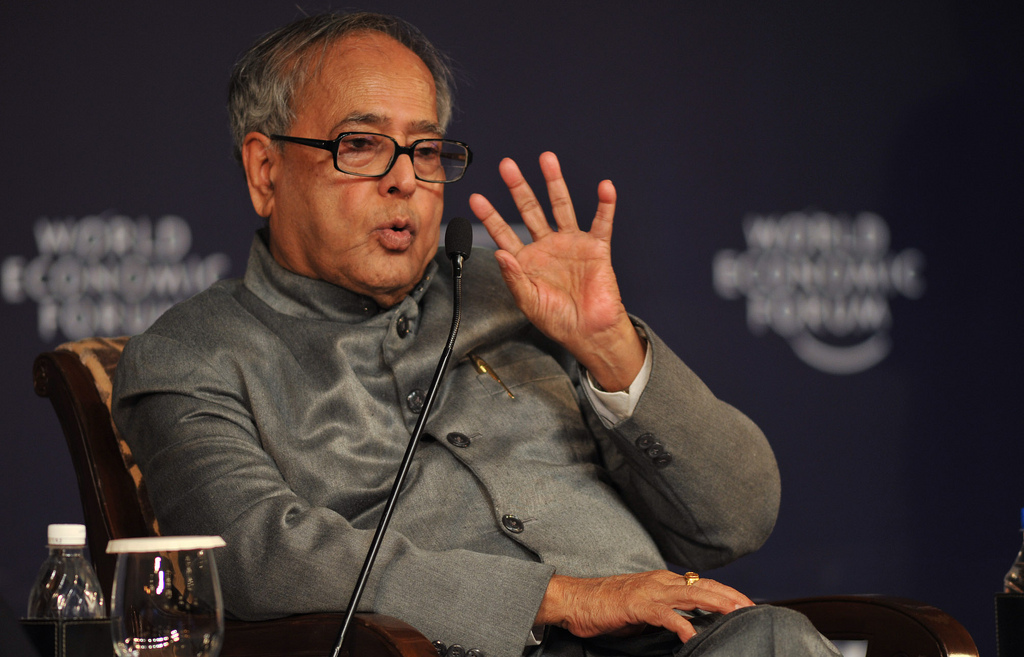
Finance Minister Pranab Mukherjee during the World Economic Summit 2009 in New Delhi

Mukherjee once again became the Finance Minister of India in 2009. He presented the annual budgets in 2009, 2010, and 2011. The 2010–11 budget included the country's first explicit target to cut public debt as a proportion of the GDP and Mukherjee targeted a budget deficit reduction of 4.1% of the GDP in the fiscal year 2012–13, from 6.5% in 2008–09.

He implemented many tax reforms, including scrapping the Fringe Benefits Tax and the Commodities Transaction Tax. He implemented the Goods and Services Tax during his tenure. These reforms were well received by major corporate executives and economists. The introduction of retrospective taxation, however, has been criticised by some economists.

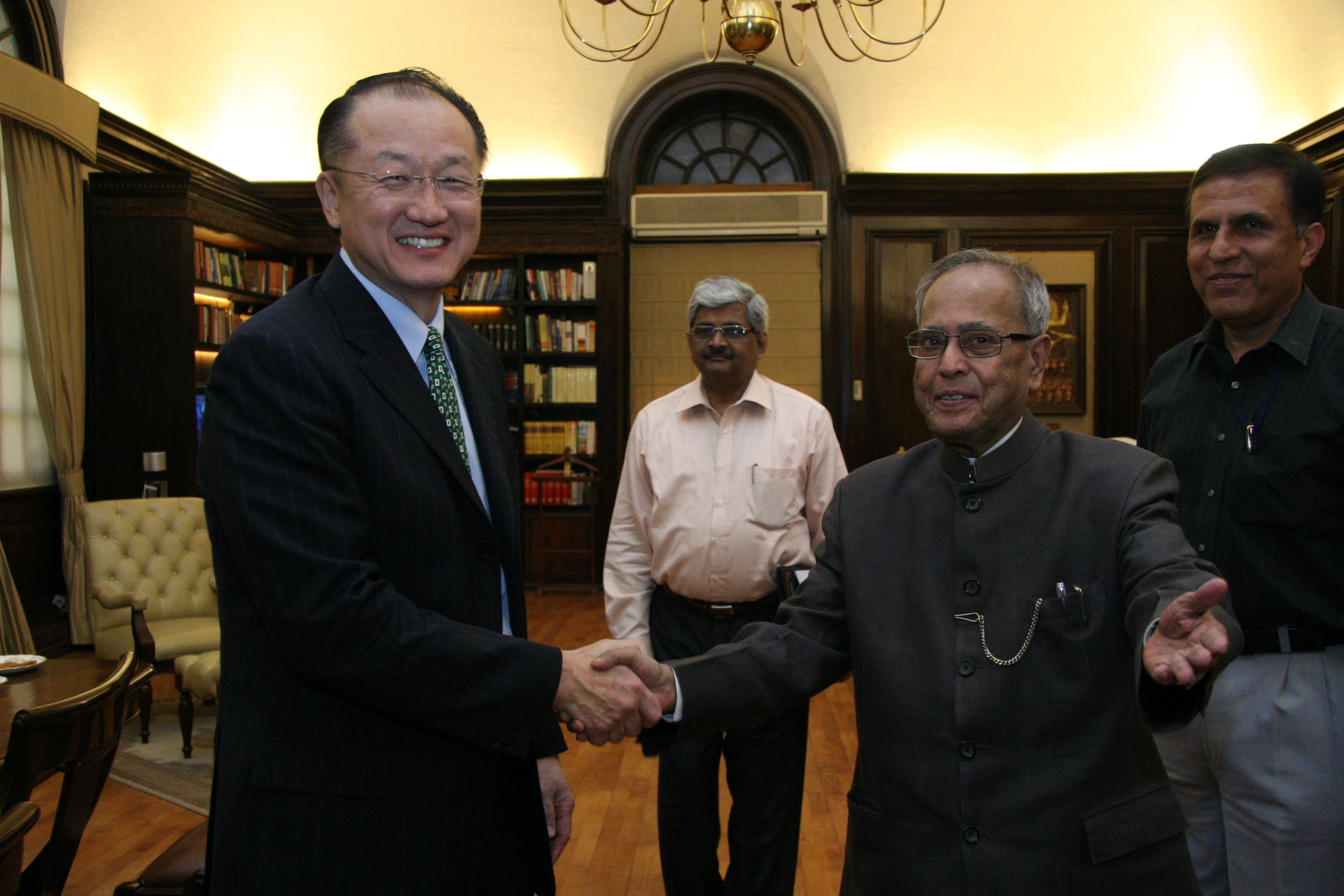
Finance Minister of India Pranab Mukherjee with President of the World Bank Group Jim Yong Kim at the Ministry of Finance HQ in New Delhi, 2012

Mukherjee expanded funding for several social sector schemes including the Jawaharlal Nehru National Urban Renewal Mission. He also supported budget increases for improving literacy and health care. He expanded infrastructure programmes such as the National Highway Development Programme. Electricity coverage was also expanded during his tenure. Mukherjee also reaffirmed his commitment to the principle of fiscal prudence as some economists expressed concern about the rising fiscal deficits during his tenure, the highest since 1991. Mukherjee declared the expansion in government spending was only temporary.

In 2010, he was awarded "Finance Minister of the Year for Asia" by Emerging Markets, the daily newspaper of record for the World Bank and the International Monetary Fund (IMF). Mukherjee was praised for "the confidence [he] has inspired in key stakeholders, by virtue of his fuel price reforms, fiscal transparency and inclusive growth strategies". The Banker also recognised him as "Finance Minister of the Year."

Mukherjee's final years at the finance ministry were not considered a success. The NDTV, upon his resignation in June 2012, wrote: "There [had] been a clamour from many quarters for a change in the Finance Ministry, with Mr Mukherjee having faced flak for several decisions where politics seemed to overwhelm economic imperatives".

=== Other positions ===
Mukherjee was chairman of the Indian Statistical Institute in Kolkata. He also held the following posts: chairman and president of the Rabindra Bharati University and the Nikhil Bharat Banga Sahitya Sammelan; trustee of the Bangiya Sahitya Parishad and the Bidhan Memorial Trust. He also served on the Planning Board of the Asiatic Society.

== Election contested ==
=== Lok Sabha ===
Year	Constituency	Party	Votes	%	Opponent	Opponent Party	Opponent Votes	%	Result	Margin	%
2004	Jangipur	INC	431,647	48.38	Abul Hasnat Khan	CPI(M)	394,787	44.70	Won	36,860	4.18
2009	Jangipur	INC	506,749	54.24	Mriganka Sekhar Bhattacharya	CPI(M)	378,600	40.52	Won	128,149	13.72

=== Rajya Sabha ===
Position	Party	Constituency	From	To	Tenure
Member of Parliament, Rajya Sabha (1st Term)	INC(I)	West Bengal	10 July 1969	9 July 1975	5 years, 364 days
Member of Parliament, Rajya Sabha (2nd Term)	INC(I)	West Bengal	10 July 1975	9 July 1981	5 years, 364 days
Member of Parliament, Rajya Sabha (3rd Term)	INC(I)	Gujarat	14 August 1981	13 August 1987	5 years, 364 days
Member of Parliament, Rajya Sabha (4th Term)	INC	West Bengal	19 August 1993	18 August 1999	5 years, 364 days
Member of Parliament, Rajya Sabha (5th Term)	INC	West Bengal	19 August 1999	13 May 2004	4 years, 268 days

== Presidential election ==
Presidential styles of Pranab Mukherjee
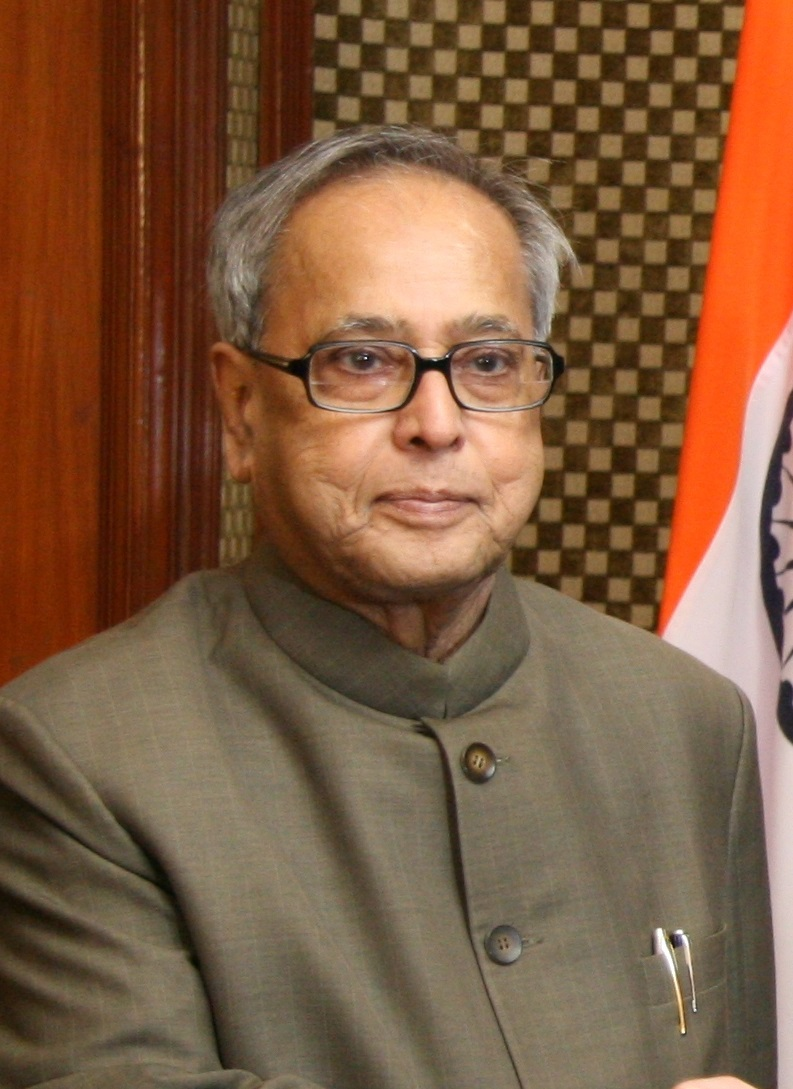
- Reference style: Hon'ble President Shri Pranab Mukherjee (within India)
- Spoken style: President Mukherjee
- Alternative style: Mr. President

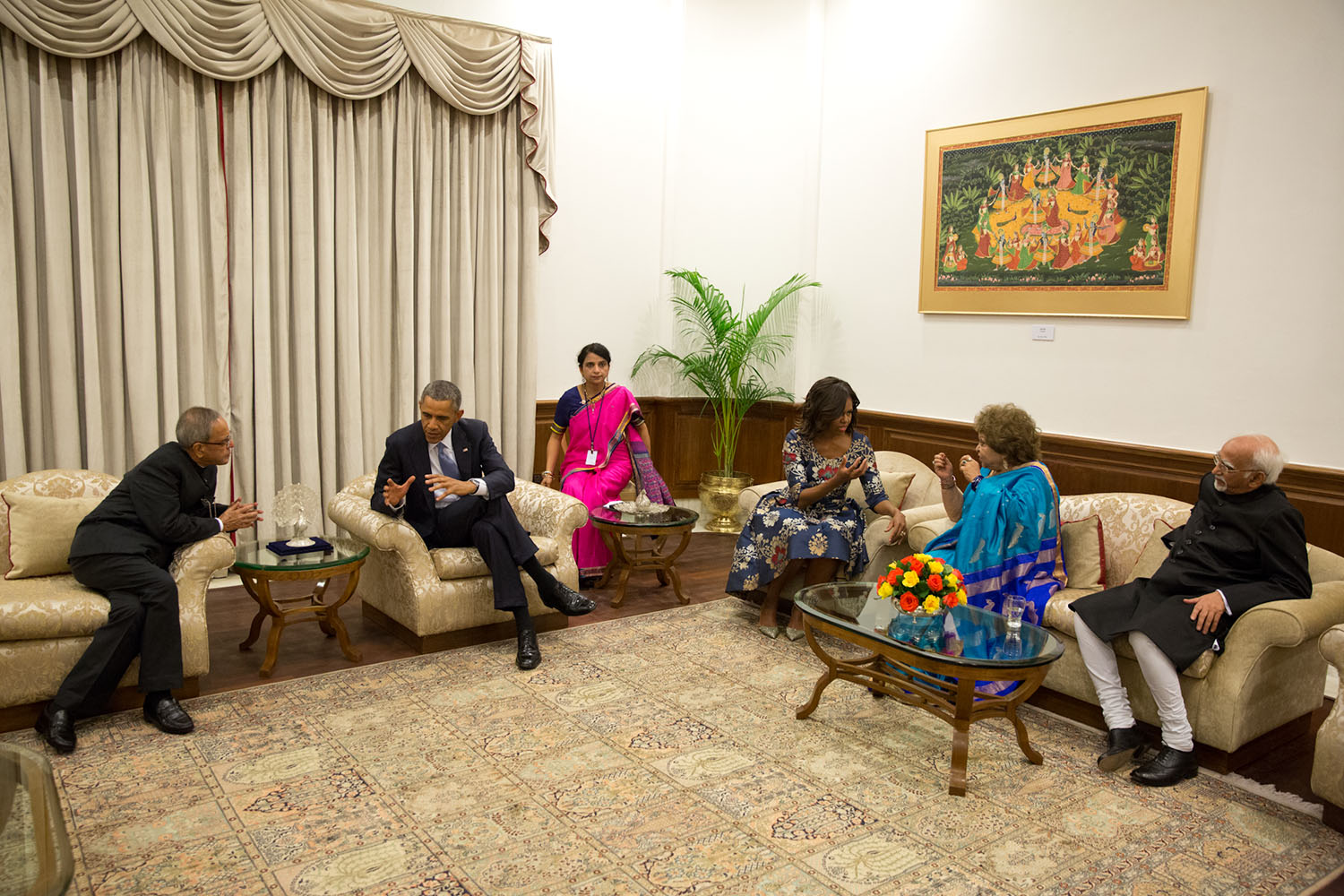
President Mukherjee with the US President Barack Obama, First Lady Michelle Obama, and Indian Vice-president Mohammad Ansari

Mukherjee was nominated as the presidential candidate of the United Progressive Alliance on 15 June 2012 after considerable political intrigue. The elections were scheduled to be conducted on 19 July 2012 and the results were expected to be announced on 22 July 2012. The nominee of the National Democratic Alliance (NDA) was P. A. Sangma. To file his nomination for the presidential poll on 28 June, Mukherjee resigned from the government on 26 June 2012.

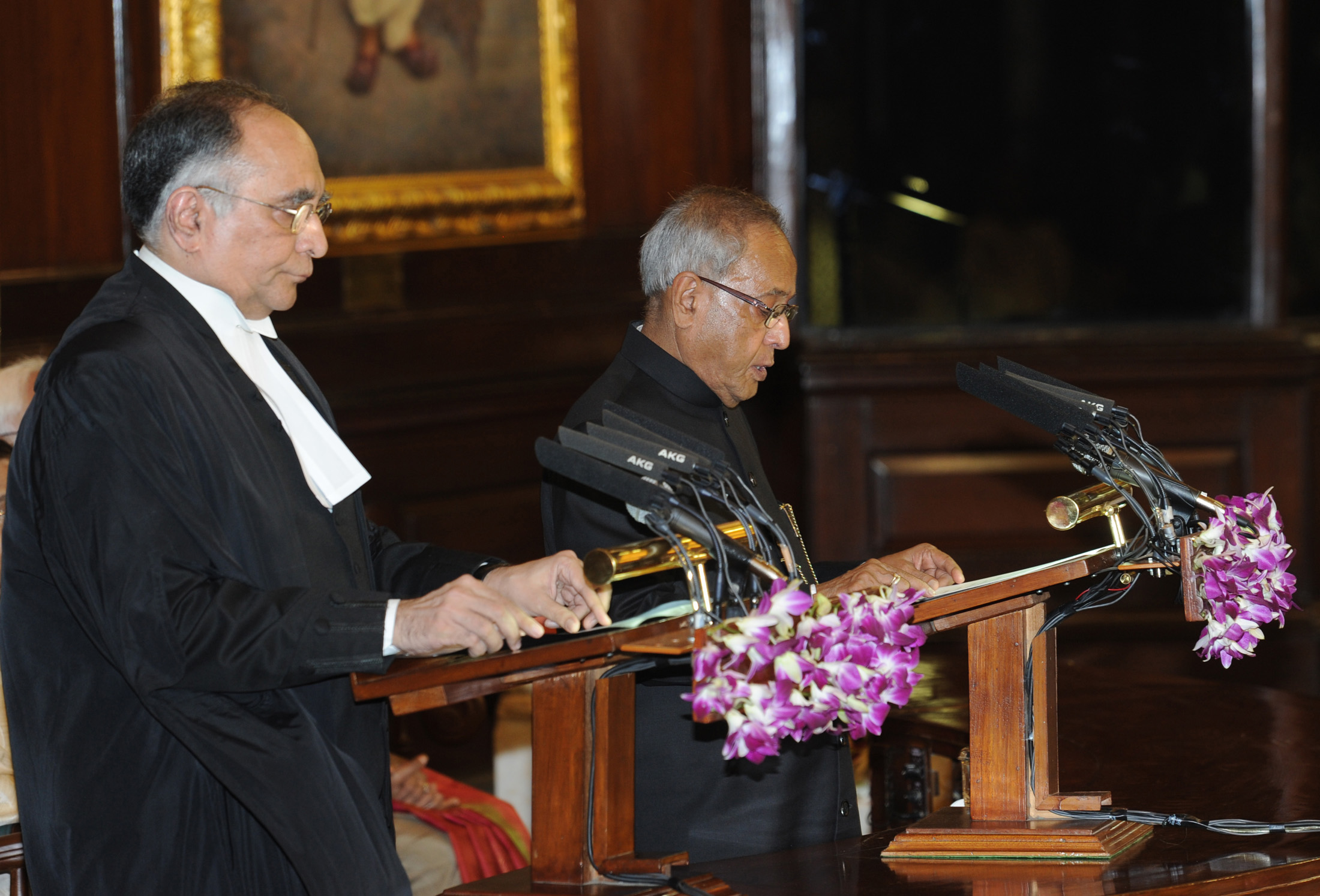
Chief Justice S. H. Kapadia administering the oath of the office of the President of India to Pranab Mukherjee at a swearing-in ceremony in the central hall of Parliament, in New Delhi on 25 July 2012

In the election, Mukherjee received 7,13,763 votes, while Sangma had 3,15,987. In his victory speech, delivered outside his residence before the results were officially announced, he said:

I would like to express my deep gratitude to all of you who are waiting. The figure has crossed 7 lakhs, only one state remains. The final figure will come from the returning officer. I would like to thank the people of India for electing me to this high office. The enthusiasm, the warmth of the people was remarkable. I have received much more from the people of this country, from the Parliament, than I have given. Now I have been entrusted with the responsibility of protecting and defending the constitution as President. I will try and justify the trust of the people. I would like to reciprocate the congratulation Shri Purno Sangma has extended.

Mukherjee was sworn in by the Chief Justice of India on 25 July 2012, becoming the first Bengali to hold the post of President of India. After being administered the oath of office, he stated that we are in the midst of a fourth world war of terror (the third was the Cold war) and what minutes of peace can achieve cannot be achieved in many years of war.

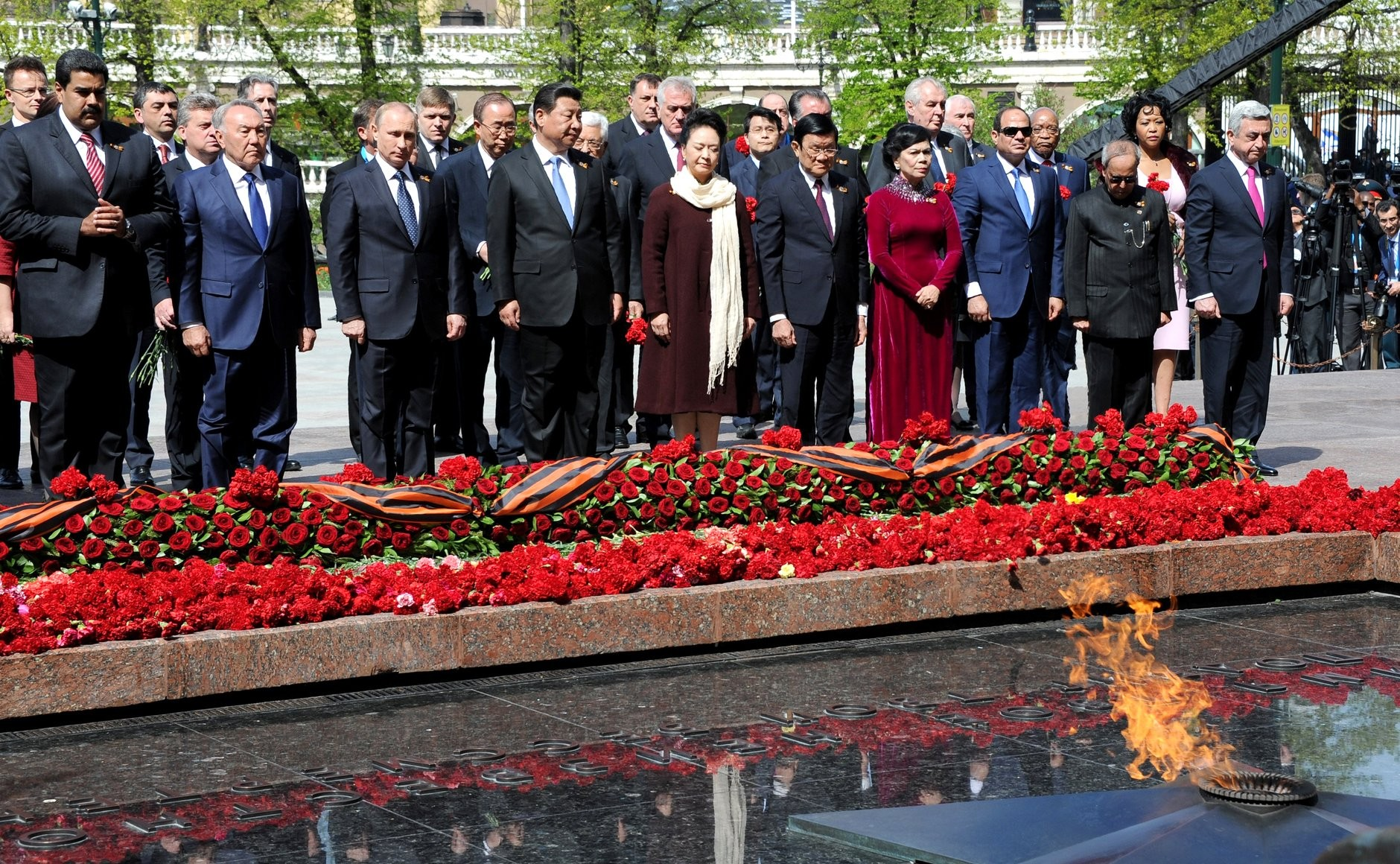
Mukherjee with leaders of Russia, China, South Africa, Vietnam, and Egypt during the Moscow Victory Day Parade, 9 May 2015

Congress President Sonia Gandhi and Prime Minister Manmohan Singh both congratulated Mukherjee on his election as president. Former Communist leader Somnath Chatterjee termed Mukherjee as one of "the best parliamentarians and statesmen of India" and said the country "has got the most able man for the top job". Opposition leader Sharad Yadav declared "the nation needed a president like Pranab Mukherjee". Delhi Chief Minister Sheila Dikshit commented and said Mukherjee will be "one of the wisest presidents". She further marvelled at the fact that parties in the opposition ranks supported Mukherjee. "Even the NDA broke up and wanted to vote for the president to be Pranab Mukherjee". The Bharatiya Janata Party (BJP) was reportedly "shocked" and "upset" at the cross-voting for Mukherjee by its legislative members. However, BJP party president Nitin Gadkari congratulated Mukherjee and said "I extend my hearty congratulations to Pranab Mukherjee on his election today as the new President of India". Gadkari further declared "I am sure that the country will make further development and progress. I wish him all success and a bright future".

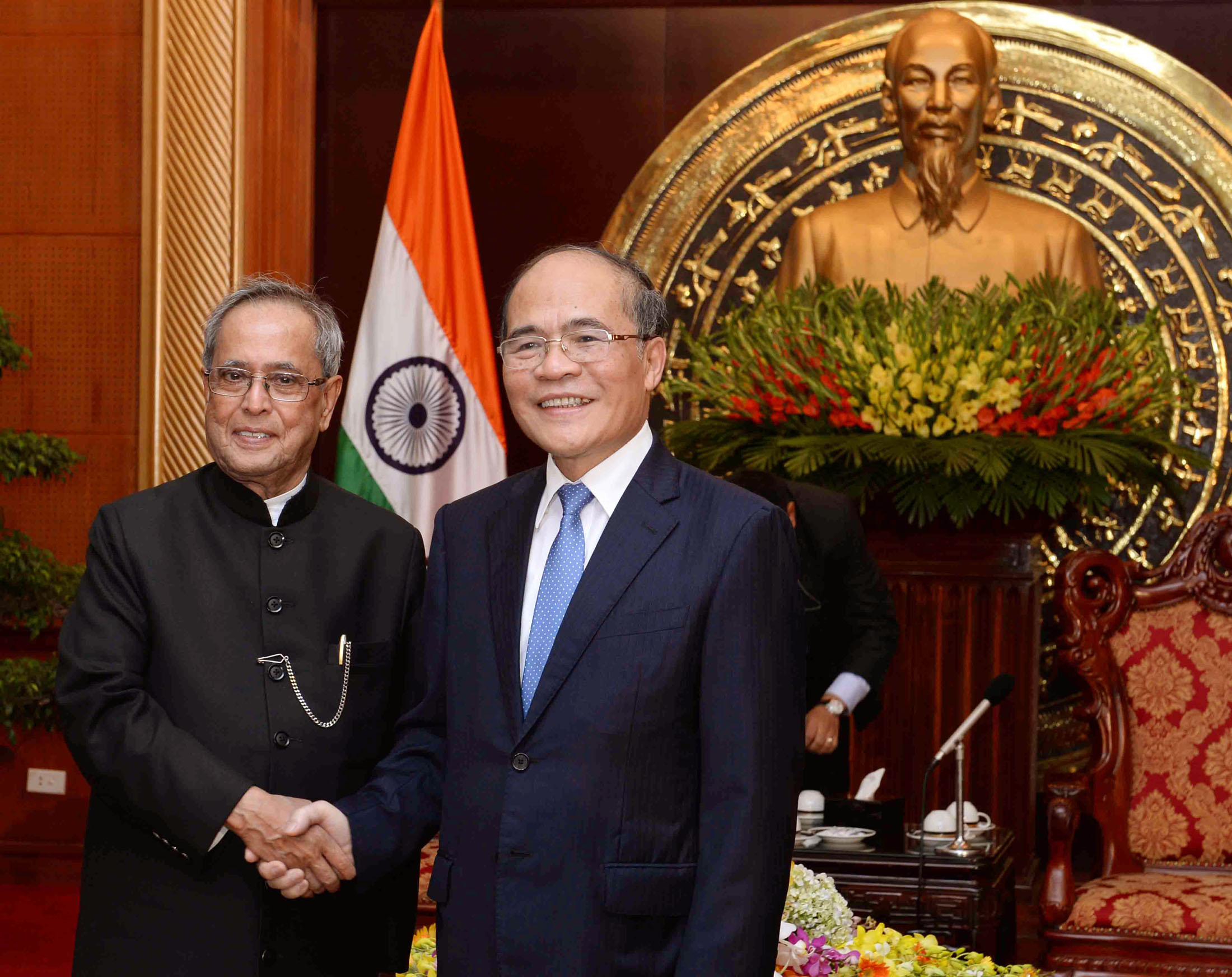
Pranab Mukherjee meeting the Chairman National Assembly of Vietnam Nguyen Sinh Hung, in Hanoi on 15 September 2014

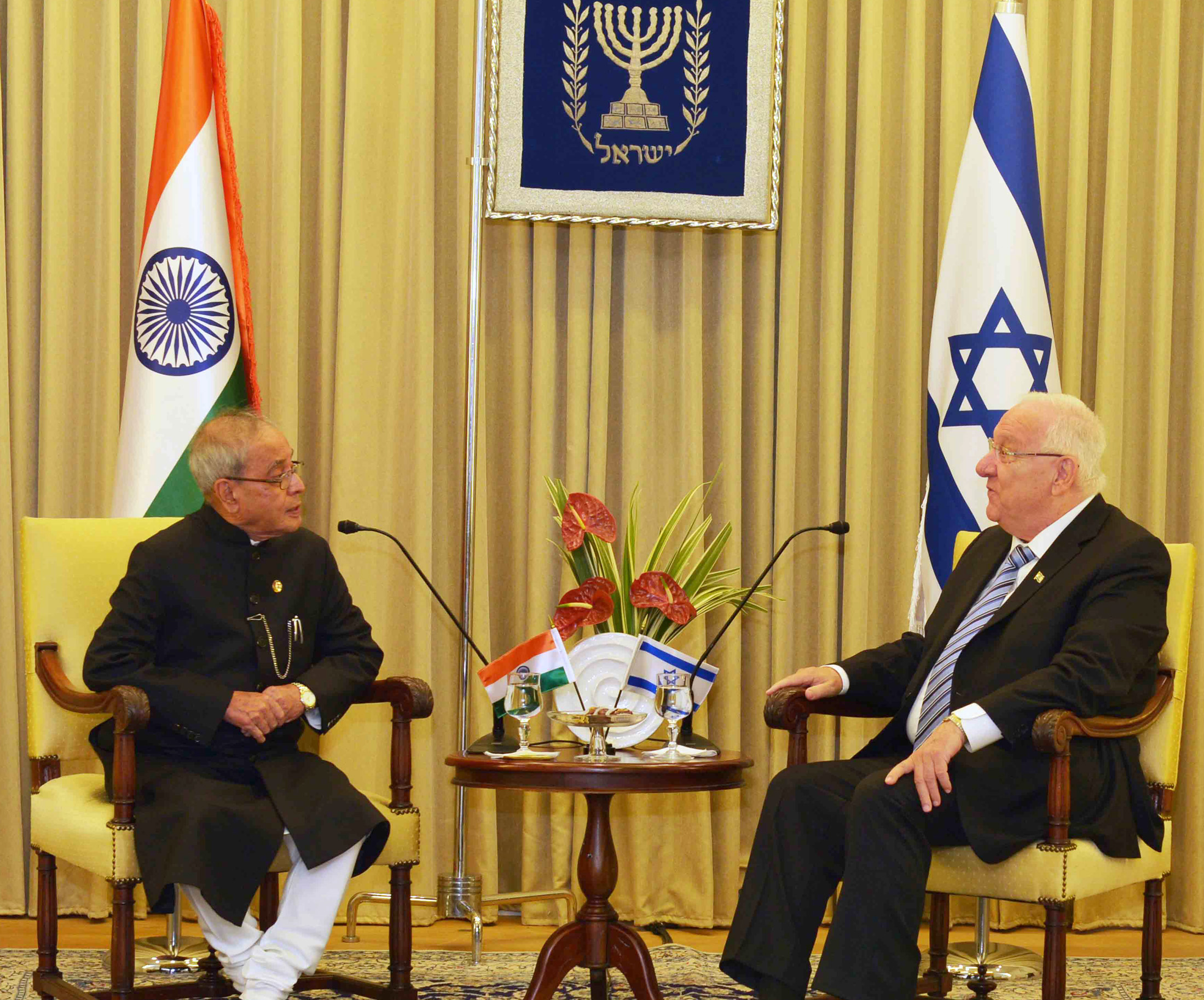
Mukherjee with Israeli President Reuven Rivlin in Jerusalem, on 14 October 2015

Zee News noted: "What is striking about [Mukherjee] is that after more than four decades in public life, the Opposition had no ammunition against him after he was declared UPA's choice for President. In spite of Team Anna making some noise about him being involved in some corruption cases, it has been more or less an easy ride for Pranab to Raisina Hill. Once when Sonia Gandhi announced his name, most of the allies and the Opposition came on board. Whereas, NDA partner JD(U) saw no merit in opposing him, one of the bitter critics of the Congress Shiv Sena too toed the line a little too easily. This support was not for Congress but for [Mukherjee]".

== President of India (2012–2017) ==
Criminal Law (Amendment) Ordinance, 2013 was promulgated by Pranab Mukherjee on 3 February 2013, providing for the amendment of the Indian Penal Code, Indian Evidence Act, and the Code of Criminal Procedure, 1973 on laws related to sexual offences, in the aftermath of the 2012 Delhi gang rape and murder. As of July 2015, President Mukherjee had rejected 24 mercy pleas including those of Yakub Memon, Ajmal Kasab, and Afzal Guru. Pranab Mukherjee became first President of India to reply all the mercy petitions in his term for the death row inmates and also replying the petitions of former presidents.

In October 2015, Mukherjee became the first Indian president to make a state visit to Israel. During the visit, he met Israeli leaders and called for stronger bilateral cooperation, including in defence, trade, science and technology.

In January 2017, Mukherjee announced that he would not contest the 2017 Presidential elections, citing "advanced age and failing health".

== Personal life ==
Pranab Mukherjee married Suvra Mukherjee on 13 July 1957. Suvra Mukherjee was born at Narail, Bengal Presidency, Present Bangladesh. She moved to Kolkata while she was 10 and married Pranab in 1957. The couple had two sons and a daughter. Suvra died on 18 August 2015, aged 74, of heart failure, while Mukherjee was still in office. Their elder son, Abhijit Mukherjee, was a Congress MP from Jangipur, West Bengal, until 2019. He was elected in a by-election after his father vacated the seat. Before his election to the Lok Sabha, Abhijit was an MLA from Nalhati in Birbhum.

Mukherjee was inspired by Deng Xiaoping and quoted him quite frequently. His hobbies were reading, gardening, and music.

His daughter Sharmistha Mukherjee is a Kathak dancer and politician of the Indian National Congress.

Mukherjee celebrated the Durga Puja at his ancestral home in Mirati village. He used to make it a point to be at Mirati village every year to take part in the four-day rituals, the puja having a "social dimension" for him. "I want to avail this opportunity to be with the people of my area", Mukherjee said during a puja ceremony on 4 October 2011.

== Illness and death ==
During the COVID-19 pandemic, on 10 August 2020, Mukherjee announced on Twitter that he had tested positive for COVID-19 prior to a surgery to remove a blood clot in his brain. He was admitted to the hospital after accidentally slipping and falling in his bathroom. He was on ventilator support and in critical condition at the Army's Research and Referral (R&R) hospital in Delhi.

On 13 August, the hospital reported that Mukherjee was in a deep coma after he underwent brain surgery; however, his vital parameters remained stable. On 19 August, the R&R said that Mukherjee's health condition had declined as he had developed a lung infection. On 25 August, his renal parameters became "slightly deranged", with the condition worsening days later.

Mukherjee died on 31 August 2020, aged 84, which was confirmed by his son Abhijit Mukherjee via Twitter. His death came after the attending hospital confirmed that his health had deteriorated early that day, stating that he had been in septic shock since a day earlier, which was caused by his lung infection.

Condolences poured in immediately from citizens and political parties of both India and other nations. India's Prime Minister Narendra Modi, then President Ram Nath Kovind, Vice President Venkaiah Naidu, Home Minister Amit Shah, and Congress leader Rahul Gandhi conveyed their condolences via Twitter. The Prince of Wales, President of Russia Vladimir Putin, President of Afghanistan Ashraf Ghani, President of the Maldives Ibrahim Mohamed Solih, Prime Minister of Bangladesh Sheikh Hasina, Prime Minister of Bhutan, Lotay Tshering, Prime Minister of Sri Lanka Mahinda Rajapaksa, and Prime Minister of Nepal K. P. Sharma Oli were among foreign leaders who paid their respects. Sports players and actors from the country also voiced their sorrow.

The Government of India announced a seven-day period of state mourning between 31 August to 6 September, whereby the national flag would fly at half mast on all buildings wherever it is flown regularly. The West Bengal state government declared a closure of state-run offices for the following day as a mark of respect.

Mukherjee's funeral was held the following day, on 1 September at the Lodi Road crematorium, with full state honours. His body was brought to the crematorium in a van instead of a gun carriage due to COVID-19 pandemic restrictions in the country. His ashes were immersed into the Ganges river in Haridwar.

== In popular culture ==
Mukherjee appeared in the Indian mock court television talk show Aap Ki Adalat (lit. 'Your Court') on India TV when he was the Minister of Defence, discussing the UPA government's performance of in the past one year since the 2004 elections.

== Awards and honours ==
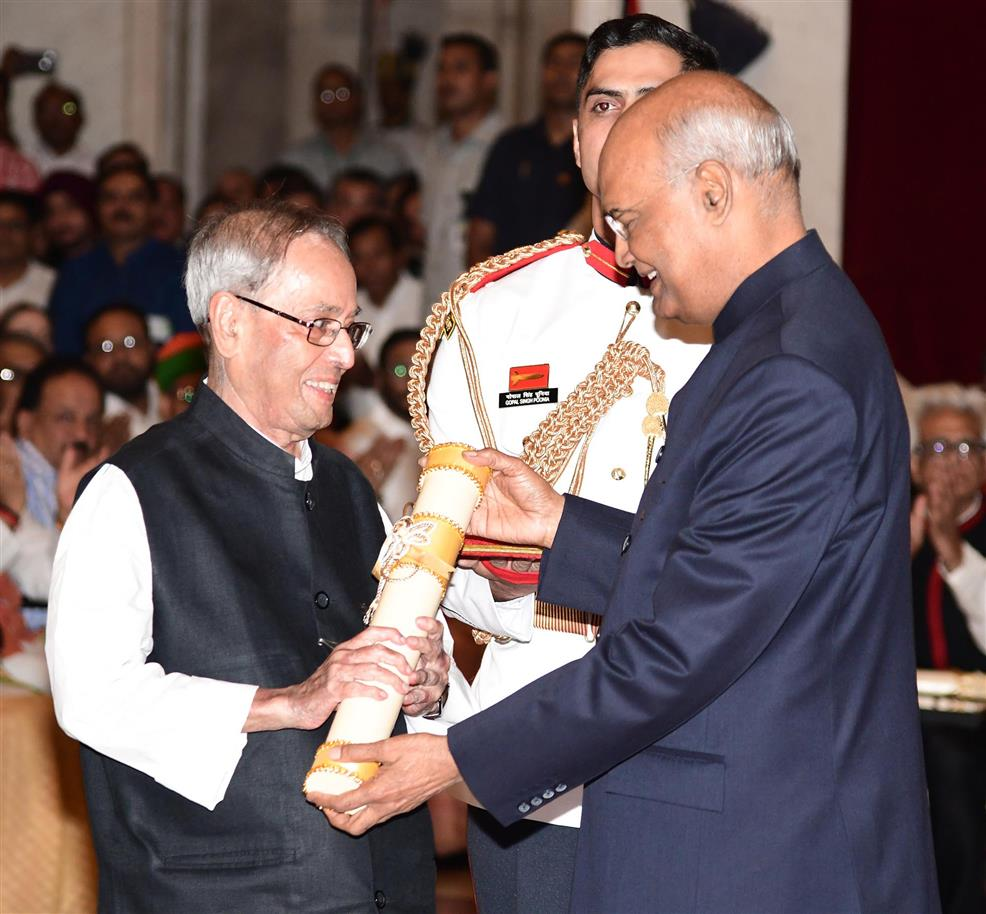
The President, Ram Nath Kovind presenting the Bharat Ratna to Pranab Mukherjee, at an Investiture-I Ceremony, at Rashtrapati Bhavan, in New Delhi on 8 August 2019

=== National honours ===
- India:
  - Bharat Ratna (8 August 2019)
  - Padma Vibhushan (26 January 2008)

=== Foreign honours ===
- Bangladesh:
  - Bangladesh Liberation War Honour (5 March 2013)
- Ivory Coast:
  - National Order of the Ivory Coast, Grand Cross (14 June 2016)
- Cyprus:
  - Order of Makarios III, Grand Collar (28 April 2017)

=== Freedom of the City ===
- Abidjan, Ivory Coast:
  - Honorary Citizenship of Abidjan (15 June 2016)
- Janakpur, Nepal:
  - Key to the City (4 November 2016)

=== Honorary degrees ===
- (United Kingdom) University of Wolverhampton:
  - Doctor of Letters (D.Litt.) (2011)
- (India) Assam University:
  - Doctor of Letters (D.Litt.) (2012)
- (India) Visvesvaraya Technological University:
  - Doctor of Science (D.Sc.) (2012)
- (Bangladesh) University of Dhaka:
  - Doctor of Law (LL.D.) (4 March 2013)
- University of Mauritius:
  - Doctor of Civil Law (DCL) (13 March 2013)
- (Turkey) Istanbul University:
  - Honorary Doctorate (5 October 2013)
- (India) University of Calcutta:
  - Honorary Doctorate (28 November 2014)
- University of Jordan:
  - Doctor of Political Science (DPS) (11 October 2015)
- (Palestine) Al-Quds University:
  - Honorary Doctorate (13 October 2015)
- (Israel) Hebrew University of Jerusalem:
  - Honorary Doctorate (15 October 2015)
- (Nepal) Kathmandu University:
  - Honorary Doctorate (3 November 2016)
- (India) Goa University:
  - Honorary Doctorate (25 April 2017)
- (India) Jadavpur University:
  - Doctor of Letters (D.Litt.) (24 December 2017)
- (Bangladesh) University of Chittagong:
  - Doctor of Letters (D.Litt.) (16 January 2018)

=== Other recognition ===
- In 1984, a Euromoney magazine survey rated him among the best finance ministers in the world.
- Finance Minister of the Year for Asia (2010), by Emerging Markets, daily newspaper of record for the World Bank and IMF.
- Finance Minister of the Year (2010), by The Banker

== Offices held ==
Pranab Mukherjee's positions in chronological order:

- Union Minister of Industrial Development: 1973–1974
- Union Minister of Shipping and Transport: 1974
- Minister of State for Finance: 1974–1975
- Union Minister of Revenue and Banking: 1975–1977
- Treasurer of Congress Party: 1978–79
- Treasurer of All India Congress Committee: 1978–79
- Leader of House of Rajya Sabha: 1980–85
- Union Minister of Commerce and Steel and Mines: 1980–1982
- Union Minister of Finance: 1982–1984
- Board of Governors of International Monetary Fund: 1982–1985
- Board of Governors of World Bank: 1982–1985
- Board of Governors of Asian Development Bank: 1982–1984
- Board of Governors of African Development Bank: 1982–1985
- Union Minister of Commerce and Supply: 1984
- Chairman: Campaign Committee of Congress-I for conducting National Elections to Parliament, 1984 Indian general election, 1991 Indian general election, 1996 Indian general election, 1998 Indian general election
- Chairman of Group of 24 (a Ministerial Group attached to IMF and World Bank): 1984, 2009–2012
- President of State Unit of Congress Party: 1985, 2000–08
- Chairman of Economic Advisory Cell of AICC: 1987–1989
- Deputy Chairman of Planning Commission: 1991–1996
- Union Minister of Commerce: 1993–1995
- Union Minister of External Affairs: 1995–1996
- President, SAARC Council of Ministers Conference: 1995
- General Secretary of AICC: 1998–1999
- Chairman of Central Election Coordination Committee: 1999–2012
- Leader of House of Lok Sabha: 2004–2012
- Union Minister of Defence: 2004–2006
- Union Minister of External Affairs: 2006–2009
- Union Minister of Finance: 2009–2012
- President of India: 25 July 2012 – 25 July 2017.

== Books written ==
- Beyond Survival: Emerging Dimensions of Indian Economy. S. Chand & Company. 1986. ISBN 0706926587.
- Off the Track: A Few Comments on Current Affairs. K. P. International. 1987.
- Challenges Before the Nation: Saga of Struggle and Sacrifice (Indian National Congress). Vikas Publishing House. 1993. ISBN 0706966236.
- A Centenary History of the Indian National Congress – Volume V: 1964–1984 (co-authored with Aditya Mukherjee). Academic Foundation Kolkata. 2011. ISBN 978-8171888641.
- Congress and the Making of the Indian Nation. Academic Foundation Kolkata. 2011. ISBN 978-8171888580.
- Thoughts and Reflections. Rupa Publications India. 2014. ISBN 978-8129134479.
- The Dramatic Decade: The Indira Gandhi Years. Rupa Publications India. 2015. ISBN 978-8129136015.
- The Turbulent Years: 1980–1996. Rupa Publications India. 2016. ISBN 978-8129137692.
- The Coalition Years: 1996–2012. Rupa Publications India. 2017. ISBN 978-8129149053.
- The Presidential Years: 2012–2017. Rupa Publications India. 2021. ISBN 978-9390356355.

== See also ==
- Presidency of Pranab Mukherjee
- List of presidents of India
- List of Padma Vibhushan award recipients

Political offices
Preceded by K. C. Pant	Leader of the Rajya Sabha; 1980–1984	Succeeded by V. P. Singh
Preceded by Ramaswamy Venkataraman	Minister of Finance; 1982–1984	Succeeded by V. P. Singh
Preceded by Mohan Dharia	Deputy Chair of the Planning Commission; 1991–1996	Succeeded by Madhu Dandavate
Preceded by Dinesh Singh	Minister of External Affairs; 1995–1996	Succeeded by Atal Bihari Vajpayee
Preceded by Atal Bihari Vajpayee	Leader of the Lok Sabha; 2004–2012	Succeeded by Sushilkumar Shinde
Preceded by George Fernandes	Minister of Defence; 2004–2006	Succeeded by A. K. Antony
Preceded by Manmohan Singh; Acting	Minister of External Affairs; 2006–2009	Succeeded by S. M. Krishna
Preceded by Manmohan Singh; Acting	Minister of Finance; 2009–2012	Succeeded by Manmohan Singh; Acting
Preceded by Pratibha Patil	President of India; 2012–2017	Succeeded by Ram Nath Kovind
