= The Witcher: The Adventure Card Game =

2007 Polish card game by Kuźnia Gier

- Designers: Magdalena Madej-Reputakowska, Maciej Reputakowski, Michał Stachyra, and Maciej Zasowski
- Illustrators: Box cover of the English edition
- Publishers: Kuźnia Gier (2007)
- Players: 2-4
- Playing time: 50 minutes
- Chance: Random card draws
- Age range: 12+
- Skills: Strategy, tactics, logic

The Witcher: The Adventure Card Game (Polish: Wiedźmin: Przygodowa Gra Karciana) is a Polish card game released in 2007 by Kuźnia Gier. It was the first board game set in the Witcher universe created by Andrzej Sapkowski to be available on the broader market. The game was met with a mixed reception from reviewers, who regarded the title as rather average.

== History ==
In January 2007, the publisher Kuźnia Gier was selected by CD Projekt Red Studio to create a card game as part of the promotion of the video game The Witcher. The Witcher: The Adventure Card Game was released in October 2007; its designers were Magdalena Madej-Reputakowska, Maciej Reputakowski, Michał Stachyra, and Maciej Zasowski. The game received editions in English (The Witcher: The Adventure Card Game) and Spanish (The Witcher: El juego de cartas de las aventuras de Geralt de Rivia). In 2010, a second edition of the game (New Edition) was released.

It was not the first board game set in the Witcher universe, as a card game had been released at the same time, also developed by Kuźnia Gier, which was included with the collector's edition of the video game.

== Contents ==
The game includes a rulebook, 110 cards (52 attack cards, 20 monster cards, 15 event cards, 10 location cards, 5 hero cards, and 4 Geralt cards, plus four player aid cards containing a rules summary), a cloth pouch with cardboard coins, and a large cardboard first-player marker depicting Geralt. The cards are illustrated with screenshots from the video game, and the game box also references the look and aesthetics of the video game's packaging.

== Gameplay ==
The Witcher: The Adventure Card Game is a card game for 2 to 4 players; an average game lasts about an hour. Players choose heroes (Triss, Dandelion, Yarpen Zigrin, Foltest, and Vesemir), bid cards, and then, by turns, play attack cards in required combinations to fight monsters, for defeating which they earn fame points; when one of the players defeats a fourth monster, the player with the highest number of those points wins the game.

== Reception ==
=== Overall assessment ===
At its release, despite having received mostly mixed reviews, the game gained substantial popularity and sold out, resulting in preparation of a second print run in 2010. After several years, though, the title lost popularity, and by 2015 it was receiving rather poor reviews unlike the video game it was designed to promote, which gained generally good reviews and went on to become the first in a very successful video game franchise.

The card game received a number of generally mixed reviews. In 2007 it was reviewed for the magazine Świat Gier Planszowych by Jacek Nowak; and a year later, for Rebel Times, by Mateusz Kominiarczuk. It was also reviewed for the online portals Gildia.pl (2008), gram.pl (2007), Nerdheim.pl (2015), and ObliczaKultury (2012); in the latter, the reviewer was the writer Michał Krzywicki. Four reviews used a point-rating system in their assessments. The reviewers from Świat Gier Planszowych, Rebel Times, and Gildia.pl gave the game 6/10; the reviewer from Nerdheim.pl, 5/10. On the English-language board game portal BoardGameGeek, in 2025, the game got a rating of 5.7 (based on 295 user ratings).

=== Specific issues ===
Most reviewers regarded the game as average. An exception was Krzywicki, who considered it recommendable, writing that "you may not play [it] ten times a day for a month, but you will certainly come back to it." By contrast, according to most other reviewers, most players will get bored with the game after a few plays, after mastering all the strategies, at which point the game becomes too predictable and boring.

According to Nowak, though the game has an "attractive theme", its drawback is "not very exciting gameplay". According to the Gildia.pl review, the game may appeal more to Witcher fans and less to experienced board-game players, for whom it will be rather too simple and, mechanically, average. The gram.pl reviewer wrote in the summary that "Kuźnia Gier managed to create a very pretty piece of junk." The Nerdheim.pl reviewer criticized the squandering of the atmospheric Witcher universe in the form of a very average board game, describing it as a "mediocre title", good for a few plays, after which it will be forgotten, and writing that "the card game served only marketing purposes and to extract money from the wallets of fans of Sapkowski's prose."

Reviewers appreciated the game's atmosphere, created through references to the Witcher universe, in particular through the card names and illustrations, though Kominiarczuk noted that the illustrations, which he likewise considered successful, may nonetheless not appeal to someone who does not like computer graphics. On the subject of illustrations, Nowak expressed disappointment due to limited variety of images used on attack cards, considering it a missed opportunity to make the game more appearling.

Reviewers largely praised the exciting bidding mechanism, in which most player interaction occurs.

Reviewers had more mixed feelings about the quality of the game's physical components. Reviewers from gram.pl, Nerdheim.pl, and ObliczaKultury considered them to be standard, decent, and solid. Kominiarczuk, Nowak, and the Gildia.pl reviewer criticized the quality of the box, pointing out that it is susceptible to damage due to its too-soft and thin cardboard; the last reviewer also pointed out that the box is too large relative to its contents.

Kominiarczuk criticized the size of the cards, which he found slippery and prone to bending; he also found fault with their non-standard dimensions, noting that they are smaller than the most popular playing cards of the MtG type, which makes them more challenging to protect with card sleeves. Reviewers from Gildia.pl and gram.pl considered the cards too thin, though they differed on whether they are nonetheless solid and resistant to damage (Gildia.pl) or not (gram.pl). Nowak also considered the font size of the text on the cards to be too small. Reviewers also differed on the quality of the large Geralt marker, which the Nerdheim.pl reviewer described as "average"; Nowak, as "grotesquely large"; and Kominiarczuk, as "nice".

Most considered the rulebook to be good, except for Kominiarczuk, who felt that it contained too many ambiguities.

Apart from the bidding, reviewers mostly evaluated the play mechanics negatively, noting a paucity of interaction between players beyond the bidding, and the repetitiveness of moves. Nowak described the play as "correct" but as not giving players "many real decisions"; he saw nothing special about the bidding and suggested that it be limited. Reviewers described the game's complexity level as low, which enables quick learning of the rules but causes the game, after a few sessions, to become too schematic, repetitive, and monotonous, especially due to the small number and variety of cards. Some reviewers pointed to an interesting exception: the event card "Pułapka" ("Trap"), which is the only element that allows players to interact outside the bidding and indicates an unused potential, in the game's mechanics, that was never exploited.

Though the game is described as intended for 2 to 4 persons, reviewers considered it to be weak for 2 persons and as effectively requiring 3 or 4 to be interesting.

=== Comparison with later games ===
When, in 2014, the next board game set in the Witcher universe was released, some reviewers compared it to the card game, usually to the disadvantage of the latter. The Board Times reviewer called it "shoddy". The reviewer from Polter described it as "not very successful… with a very clichéd mechanic".

== See also ==
- Gwent: The Witcher Card Game
- The Witcher Adventure Game
