= Mirosław Dzielski =

Polish philosopher, writer and politician

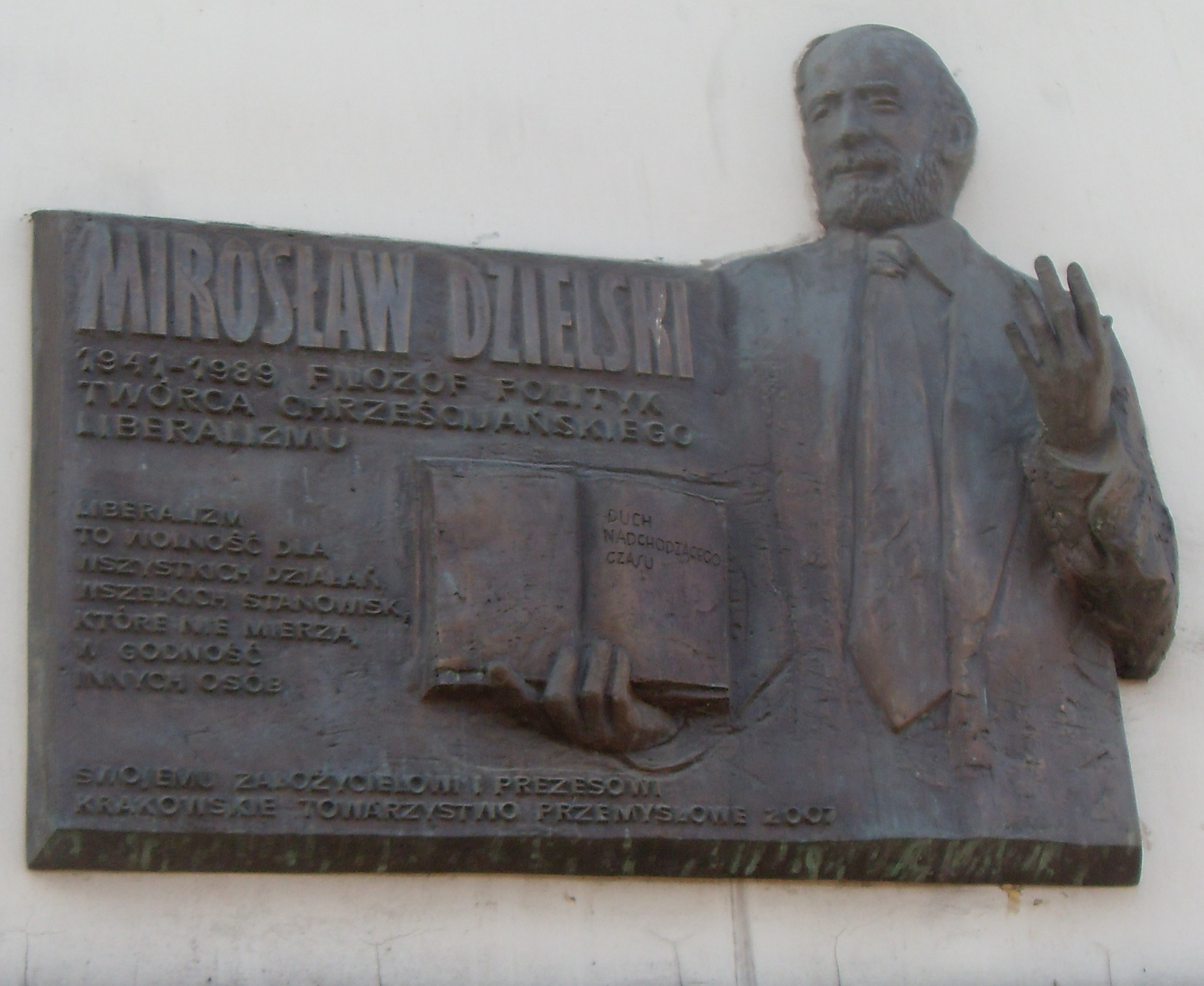
Mirosław Dzielski

Mirosław Dzielski (1941–1989) was a Polish philosopher, writer and politician, founder of the Kraków Industrial Society (Krakowskie Towarzystwo Przemysłowe) in 1985. Dzielski was one of the leaders of the democratic anti-communist opposition in the 1980s in Poland. He was married to classics scholar Maria Dzielska. Father to Witold Dzielski.

== Publications ==
- Mirosław Dzielski, Odrodzenie ducha - budowa wolności. Pisma zebrane, KTP, Kraków 1995 (Revival of spirit - formation of freedom. The Collected works - this volume contains almost all of his books, articles, reviews, letters and poems)
