= Reservation policy in Bihar =

Affirmative active system in Bihar, India

Reservation policy in Bihar is a system of affirmative action that provides historically disadvantaged groups representation in education and employment. Reservations in the state rose from 60 percent in 2021 to 75 percent in 2023. In June 2024, Patna High Court struck down the new reservation policy.

== History ==
Bihar has long struggled for equal educational opportunities and government jobs. Reservation was especially believed by the oppressed classes as a successful mechanism for affirmative action against discrimination.

In 1978, Karpoori Thakur introduced 26% reservation model in Bihar, for the backward classes in the Government jobs. In this layered reservation regime, Other Backward Class got 12%, Most Backward Class got 8%, women got 3%, and economically backward classes (EBWs) from among the upper castes got 3% reservation in state government jobs. Later, Bihar has a sub-quota within OBC quota of 18% for Extremely Backward Castes (EBCs) and 3% for Backward Caste women in government jobs and educational institutes. EWS reservation was implemented in 2019.

The reservation in the State of Bihar was increased on 9 November 2023. With the existing 10% quota for Economically Weaker Section (EWS), the effective quota will be 75%. The main beneficiaries are the EBCs and OBCs, whose quota is proposed to be raised from 12% to 25% and 8% to 18% respectively. According to 2022 Bihar caste-based survey, 36.01% of the population are EBCs, and 27.13% are OBCs.For SCs, the proposed new quota is 20%, up from the existing 14%. The SC population is estimated at 19.65%. The quota for STs, however, is proposed to be slashed from 10% to 2%. With most of the tribal areas going to Jharkhand after the bifurcation of Bihar in 2000, the tribal population in Bihar is less than 2%. Bihar Government issued gazette notifications for raising the quota to 75% after Governor Rajendra Arlekar gave his assent to two bills. The two bills were notified as - The Bihar Reservation of Vacancies in Posts and Services (For Scheduled Castes, Scheduled Tribes and Other Backward Classes) (Amendment) Act 2023 and The Bihar (In Admission in Educational Institutions) Reservation (Amendment) Act 2023.

== Present reservation scheme details ==
Below are the details of reservation followed in Bihar. Reservation will increase up to 75% in Bihar, financial help will also be provided to 94 lakh poor people.

Reservation in Bihar
1. Backward Class (BC) (18.0%)
2. Extremely Backward Communities (EBC) (25.0%)
3. Scheduled Castes (SC) (20.0%)
4. Scheduled Tribes (ST) (2.00%)
5. Economically Weaker Section (EWS) (10.0%)
6. General (without EWS) (25.0%)

| Main Category as per Government of Bihar | Reservation Percentage for each Main Category as per Government of Bihar | Category as per Government of India |
|---|---|---|
| Backward Class (BC) | 12% | Backward Class |
| Extremely Backward Class (EBC) | 18% | Backward Class |
| Scheduled Castes | 16% | Scheduled Castes (others) |
| Scheduled Tribes | 1% | Scheduled Tribes |
| Economically Weaker Section (EWS) | 10% | EWS |
| Total Reservation Percentage | | 65% |

== Reservation in municipal bodies ==
In 2022, Government of Bihar issued gazette notification for reserving seats for Other Backward Castes (‘OBC’) and Extremely Backward Classes (‘EBC’) for election to all municipal bodies in Bihar.

== Women reservation in panchayat and government jobs ==
In 2006, women were given 50% reservation in local bodies and panchayats in Bihar. Also in 2006, Women are given 50 per cent reservation in primary teacher recruitment. Later in 2016, 35 per cent reservation was given to women in all government jobs in Bihar.

== Legal battle ==
In October 2022, Patna High Court declared the reservation for Other Backward Castes (‘OBC’) and Extremely Backward Classes (‘EBC’) for election to all municipal bodies in Bihar as ‘illegal’. The verdict was made on the basis of Supreme Court judgement in Krishna Murthy (Dr.) & Ors. Vs. Union of India and Anr. case that mandated that the elections to state municipalities should follow the triple test condition. On 27 November 2023, PIL was filed before Patna High Court against Bihar quota hike laws. On 20 June 2024, Patna High Court struck down 65 per cent reservation cap in government jobs and educational institutions.

== See also ==
- 2022 Bihar caste-based survey
- Reservation in India
- Indra Sawhney & Others v. Union of India
- Court Cases Relating to India's Reservation System
- Reservation policy in Tamil Nadu
- Caste politics in India
