= Settibalija =

Name of two distinct social groups in South India

Settibalija (also Setti Balija, Setty Balija) refers to two distinct and completely unrelated communities in Andhra Pradesh, India. The term Setti Balija (or Chetty Balija) historically referred to a sub-caste of the Balija community. These Setti Balijas were a prominent mercantile community of South India with a history dating back to the Vijayanagara Empire. They are currently found in the Rayalaseema region and are classified as a Forward Caste.

In 1920, as a part of Sanskritization process, the toddy-tapper community of Godavari districts — not related to the Balija caste and the historical Setti Balija trader community — changed their caste name from Ediga or Eendra to the more respectable name of Chettu Balija (Chettu meaning tree in Telugu), which transformed to Setti Balija over a period of time. The Settibalijas of Godavari districts are related to the larger Goud community and are classified as a Backward Caste.

== Setti Balijas of Rayalaseema ==
Setti Balija (also known as Setty Balija, Chetty Balija, Balija) is a subgroup of the Balija caste. The community identifies itself as Setti Balija in Rayalaseema while in Coastal Andhra they prefer to call themselves Balija to avoid confusion with an unrelated community of the same name. Their traditional occupation is trading. These Setti Balijas, along with Komatis, were a prominent mercantile community of South India with a history dating back to the Vijayanagara Empire.

In the present-day, they are landholders and are involved in agriculture, business, and trade in food grain. They are classified as a Forward Caste in Andhra Pradesh. Setti Balija (sub-caste of Balija) is present all across Rayalaseema, and in smaller numbers in former Nellore and Prakasam districts. The Setty Balijas of Rayalaseema are closely related to the landowning Kapu/Telaga community of Coastal Andhra. They are completely unrelated to the Coastal Andhra community known as Setti Balija, who are a part of Goud community and changed their caste name from Ediga to Setti Balija in 1920 to attain social dignity.

== Settibalijas of Coastal Andhra ==
The Settibalijas (also known as Chettu Balija, Ediga, Eendra, Settiga, Settikula) of Coastal Andhra mostly live in the erstwhile districts of East Godavari, West Godavari and in smaller numbers in Visakhapatnam and Krishna districts. Traditionally, they are a community of toddy tappers. They are similar to other Telugu toddy tapping castes like Goud, Ediga, Yatha, Gamalla, Goundla, Segidi etc.

The Settibalija community of Coastal Andhra is classified as a Backward Caste and is listed under BC-B in the Andhra Pradesh Backward Castes list. They are completely unrelated to the Setty Balija community of Rayalaseema who are traders and landlords.

History

In the early 20th century, toddy tappers of Godavari districts were looked down upon by the upper caste people due to their occupation and low economic status. At the time, they were referred to as Ediga (ఈడిగ) or Eendra (ఈండ్ర) with the disparaging suffix -gadu added to the names of men. They were also known as Chettu gallu (Chettu meaning tree in Telugu).

On 25 September 1920, Dommeti Venkata Reddy (1853–1928), a rich merchant from the Eendra community organised a caste meeting in Bodasakurru, East Godavari district (now in Konaseema district) and passed the resolution that the Ediga/Eendra caste would henceforth only be referred to as Settibalija (Setti sounding similar to Chettu meaning tree or Chottu meaning tapping; and Balija meaning trader/businessman).

Even though Edigas are unrelated to the Balija community, the word 'Balija' was added to their caste name as it was considered to be a respectable name. Venkata Reddy urged his fellow Edigas to record their caste under their new name in land documents, censuses, and other government records. He also resolved that -gadu would not be used for the names of toddy-tapper families in any manner and submitted a memorandum to the district collector on the same. He also established a high school and undertook other initiatives for the educational development of his caste.

In 2020, members of the community celebrated the 100th anniversary of the renaming of their caste from Ediga to Settibalija.
