= Court cases related to reservation in India =

List of reservation court cases in India

In Indian constitutional law, reservation is a form of affirmative action reserving certain positions in the workforce to specific sections of the population. It was implemented to improve social mobility as previously, members of specific castes and tribes were heavily discriminated against and prevented from working in specific positions or entering specific places.

Case	Summary of ruling	Notes
State of Madras v. Champakam Dorairajan; AIR 1951 SC 226	Court ruled that caste-based reservation as per Communal Award violate Article 15(1) of the constitution.	Led to the introduction of the First Amendment of the constitution, which invalidated the judgment.
M. R. Balaji v. State of Mysore; AIR 1963 SC 649	The government's 68% reservation on college admissions was deemed excessive and unreasonable, and was capped at 50%.	Almost all states except Tamil Nadu (69%, under 9th schedule) and Rajasthan (68% quota including 14% for forwarding castes) have observed this 50% limit. Tamil Nadu exceeded the limit in 1980. Andhra Pradesh tried to exceed the limit in 2005, which was postponed by the high court.
Syndicate Bank SC & ST Employees Association & Others v. Union of India & Others; 1990 SCR(3) 713; 1990 SCC Supl. 350	Reaffirmed Bihar State Harijan Kalyan Parishad v. Union of India in that reservation, policy cannot be denied by method of selection, and was applicable to the highest level of promotion.	This judgment was implemented only in Syndicate Bank to April 1993.
Indra Sawhney & Others v. Union of India; AIR 1993 SC 477	The constitution recognized social and educational backwardness, but not economic backwardness. The court upheld separate reservation for OBC in central government jobs, but excluded these to the "creamy layer" (the forward section of a backward class, above a certain income). At no point should the reservation exceed 50%.	Judgement implemented, with 27% central government reservation for OBCs. However, some states denied the existence of the creamy layer, and a report commissioned by the supreme court was not implemented. The case was pressed again in 1999 and the supreme court reaffirmed the creamy layer exclusion and extended it to SCs and STs.
General Manager Southern Railway v. Rangachari; AIR 1962 SC 36, State of Punjab v. Hiralal; 1970(3) SCC 567	A divided court held that reservations could be made in promotions as well as appointments.	This was overruled in the 1992 case Indra Sawhney & Others v. Union of India.
Akhil Bharatiya Soshit Karamchari Sangh (Railway) v. Union of India (1981) 1 SCC 246	Upheld the "carry forward rule" of the railway board in a selection of posts above 50% reservation, allowing for "some excess". This was overruled in Indra Sawhney & Others v. Union of India which held that reservations cannot be applied in promotions.	This led to the addition of clause 4A to article 16 of the constitution, empowering the state to make provision for reservation in promotion to any posts where SC/ST are not adequately represented.
Union of India v. Varpal Singh; AIR 1996 SC 448, Ajitsingh Januja & Others v. State of Punjab; AIR 1996 SC 1189
M. G. Badappanavar v. State of Karnataka; 2001 (2) SCC 666	Articles 16 (4) and (4A) do not confer fundamental rights or constitutional duties, but invest discretion in the state to consider providing reservation.
Post-Graduate Institute of Medical Education and Research, Chandigarh v. Faculty Association; AIR 1998 SC 1767	When considering a single post, no reservation can be made (as it would amount to 100% reservation).
Ashok Kumar Gupta: Vidyasagar Gupta v. State of Uttar Pradesh; 1997 (5) SCC 201		77th Constitution amendment (Art 16(4 A) & (16 4B) introduced to invalidate judgement.
M. Nagraj & Others v. Union of India and Others. AIR 2007 SC 71	Upheld the constitutionality of the 77th amendment.	1. Art. 16(4)(A) and 16(4)(B) flow from Art. 16(4) and do not alter the structure of Art. 16(4). 2. Backwardness and inadequacy of representation are the compelling reasons for providing reservations keeping in mind the overall efficiencies of state administration. 3. Government has to apply cadre strength as a unit in the operation of the roster in order to ascertain whether a given group is adequately represented in the service. The roster has to be post-specific with the inbuilt concept of replacement rather than being based on vacancies. 4. Direct recruitment to ensure adequate representation of a backward category may be made at the discretion of the authority. 5. Backlog vacancies are excluded from the 50% limit. 6. Reserved category candidates are entitled to compete for general category posts, and will not be counted against the quota limit. 7. Reserved candidates are entitled to compete with the general candidates for promotion to the general post. On their selection, they are to be adjusted in the general post as per the roster and the reserved candidates should be adjusted in the points earmarked in the roster to the reserved candidates. 8. Each post must be marked for the particular category of the candidate to be appointed, and any subsequent vacancy has to be filled by that category alone (replacement theory).
R. K. Sabharwal v. State of Punjab; AIR 1995 SC 1371 : (1995) 2 SCC 745	A roster to select members for a body is to operate only until the reservation quota is reached, and thereafter disposed.
Union of India v. Varpal Singh; AIR 1996 SC 448, Ajitsingh Januja & Others v. State of Punjab; AIR 1996 SC 1189 : 1995 2 SCC 715	Reserved-category candidates benefiting from accelerated promotion would not gain consequential seniority over general candidates when considering subsequent promotion.	This decision was overruled and reinstated in subsequent years, (Note: Overruled in Jagdish Lal and Others v. State of Haryana and Others (1997) 6 SCC 538, which was in turn overruled by Ajitsingh Januja & Others v. State of Punjab & Others AIR 1999 SC 3471.) and M. G. Badappanvar v. State of Karnataka (2001[2] SCC 666: AIR 2001 SC 260) held that roster promotions were for the limited purpose of due representation at various levels of service, and did not confer seniority.
M. Nagraj & Others v. Union of India and Others; AIR 2007 SC 71	Upheld the constitutionality of the 85th amendment.	The 85th constitutional amendment added consequential seniority to Art 16 (4)(A)
S. Vinodkumar v. Union of India; 1996 6 SCC 580	It is not permissible to relax standards of evaluation in matters of reservation in promotion	By the Constitution (82nd) Amendment Act a proviso was inserted at the end of Art 335. M. Nagraj & Others v. Union of India and Others (AIR 2007 SC 71) held the amendments constitutional.
Suraj Bhan Meena v. State of Rajasthan (2011) 1 SCC 467	Government rules for reservation cannot be introduced without quantifiable data of backwardness and underrepresentation.
S. Balakrishnan v. S. Chandrasekar; 28/2/2005, The Government of Tamil Nadu Vs. Registration Department SC/ST (9/12/2005)	The Madras High Court held that reservation in promotion is available only to SC and ST and not to OBC.
Sudam Shankar Baviskar v. Edu. Off. (Sec), Z. P. Jalgaon; 2007 (2) MhLJ 802	Consequential seniority is not available to Vimukta Jati and Nomadic Tribes.
Union of India v. S. Kalugasalamoorthy; 2010 writ no. 15926/2007	Reserved quotas are not counted for a person selected on the basis of his own seniority.
I. R. Coelho (deceased) by LRS. v. State of Tamil Nadu; 2007 (2) SCC 1: 2007 AIR(SC) 861	Supreme court advised Tamil Nadu to follow 50% reservation limit	Tamil Nadu Reservations were put under the 9th Schedule of the constitution, which had already been upheld by the court.
Unni Krishnan, J.P. & Others. v. State of Andhra Pradesh & Others. 1993 (1) SCC 645	The right to establish educational institutions can neither be a trade or business nor can it be a profession within the meaning of Article 19(1)(g).	This was overruled in T.M.A. Pai Foundation v State of Karnataka (2002 8 SCC 481)
P. A. Inamdar v. State of Maharashtra; 2005 AIR(SC) 3226	Reservations cannot be enforced on private educational institutions which do not receive government funding.	93rd constitutional amendment introduced Art 15(5).
Ashoka Kumar Thakur v. State of Bihar; 1995 5 SCC 403	The supreme court overruled further criteria Bihar and Uttar Pradesh had codified to identify the "creamy layer", such as educational qualifications and property holdings, as arbitrary and unconstitutional.
Ashoka Kumar Thakur v. Union of India; 2007 RD-SC 609	Upheld the 93rd Amendment; found creamy layer principle applies to OBCs and not STs and SCs. The government must set reservation thresholds to ensure quality and merit do not suffer, and set a deadline to achieve free and compulsory education for every child.	Recommended reviews of backwardness every 10 years.
Janhit Abhiyan vs Union Of India; Writ Petition (Civil) No(S). 55 OF 2019	Upheld the 103rd Amendment which introduced 10% reservation for Economically Weaker Section (EWS) in education and public employment.	It held that the 50% cap on quota is not inviolable and affirmative action on economic basis may go a long way in eradicating caste-based reservation. This constitutional amendment pushed the total reservation to 59.50% in central institutions.
State of Punjab v Davinder Singh 2024 INSC 562	The Supreme Court held that the State has powers to sub-classify the Scheduled Castes and Scheduled Tribes. The application of principle of creamy layer to reservations for the Scheduled Castes and the Scheduled Tribes is justified.
