= Gamalla =

Indian caste

The Gamalla are an Indian caste whose traditional occupation was that of toddy tapping. They also produced and sold the arrack.

The Gamalla community of Andhra Pradesh and the then Madras State was classified by the First Backward Classes Commission as an Other Backward Class in India's positive discrimination system for socio-economically deprived communities. Those of Puducherry were similarly classified by the Second Backward Classes Commission, and in both cases they were listed with the Gouds and the Kalalis.

Richard Eaton believes that Papadu, the social bandit who died in 1710, was a member of the Gamalla or Gavandla community.
