= Reservation in India =

Form of affirmative action

Reservation is a system of affirmative action in India that was established during the British Raj. Based on provisions in the Indian constitution, it allows the union government and the states and union territories of India to allocate a specific percentage of reserved quotas or seats, in higher education admissions, employment, political bodies, etc., for "socially and economically backward citizens". Since its implementation, reservation has been a subject of massive debates and controversies over its impact, execution and effectiveness, significantly shaping the agendas of political parties and the actions of social groups.

== History of reservation ==
=== Before independence ===
Quota systems favouring certain castes and other communities existed before independence in the British Raj. Demands for various forms of positive discrimination has been made, for example, in 1881 and 1891. Chatrapati Shahu (aka Rajarshi Shahu Maharaj), the Maharaja of the princely state of Kolhapur, introduced reservation in favor of non-Brahmin and backward classes, much of which came into effect in 1902. He provided free education to everyone and opened several hostels to make it easier for them to receive it. He also tried to ensure that people thus educated were suitably employed, and he appealed both for a class-free India and the abolition of untouchability. His 1902 measures created 50 percent reservation for educationally deprived communities. In 1918, at the behest of several non-Brahmin organizations criticizing Brahmin domination of administration, the Mysore Raja Nalvadi Krishnaraja Wadiyar created a committee to implement reservations for non-Brahmins in government jobs and education over the opposition of his Diwan M. Viswesvaraya, who resigned in protest. On 16 September 1921, the first Justice Party government passed the first Communal Government Order (G. O. # 613), thereby becoming the first elected body in the Indian legislative history to legislate reservations, which have since become standard across the country.

The Imperial parliament at Westminster introduced elements of reservation in the Indian Councils Act 1909 and there were many other measures put in place prior to independence. The depressed classes were provided some seats in 1919 before seeing further increase in 1925.

In 1927, the Madras Presidency provided 44% reservation to Non-Brahmin Hindus, 16% to Brahmins, Muslims, Christians, and Anglo-Indians, and 8% to Scheduled Castes.

During the Round Table Conference of June 1932, the Prime Minister of Britain, Ramsay MacDonald, proposed the Communal Award, according to which separate representation was to be provided for Muslims, Sikhs, Indian Christians, Anglo-Indians, and Europeans. The disadvantaged classes, roughly corresponding to the STs (Scheduled Tribes) and SCs (Scheduled Castes), were assigned a number of seats to be filled by election from constituencies in which only they could vote, although they could also vote in other seats. The proposal was controversial: Mahatma Gandhi fasted in protest against it but many among the depressed classes, including B. R. Ambedkar, had to favor it. After negotiations, Gandhi reached an agreement with Ambedkar to have a single Hindu electorate, with backward classes having more seats reserved within it. Electorates for other religions, such as Islam and Sikhism, remained separate. This became known as the Poona Pact.

In 1942, the Scheduled Castes gained 8.5% reservation in central services and other facilities for the first time.

=== After independence ===
After the independence of India in 1947 there were some major initiatives in favor of the Scheduled Castes and Scheduled Tribes (SCs and STs) and after the 1980s in favour of OBCs (Other Backward Castes) and in 2019 for poor in the general category. The country's affirmative action program was launched in 1950 and is the oldest such programme in the world.

A common form of caste discrimination in India was the practice of untouchability. SCs were the primary targets of the practice, which was outlawed by the new Constitution of India.

In 1954, the Ministry of Education suggested that 20 percent of places should be reserved for the SCs and STs in educational institutions with a provision to relax minimum qualifying marks for admission by 5 percent wherever required. In 1982, it was specified that 15 percent and 7.5 percent of vacancies in public sector and government-aided educational institutes should be reserved for the SC and ST candidates, respectively.

A significant change began in 1979 when the Mandal Commission or the Socially and Educationally Backward Classes (SEBC) Commission was established to assess the situation of the socially and educationally backward classes. The commission did not have exact population figures for the OBCs and so used data from the 1931 census, thus estimating the group's population at 52 per cent. In 1980, the commission's report recommended that a reserved quota for OBCs of 27 per cent should apply in respect of services and public sector bodies operated by the Union Government. It called for a similar change to admissions to institutes of higher education, except where states already had more generous requirements. It was not until the 1990s that the recommendations were implemented in Union Government jobs. In 2006, the Union government extended reservations for Other Backward Classes in institutes of higher education it substantially funded. In 2019 the government announces the 10% reservation in educational institutions and government jobs for economically weaker section of the general category.

The Constitution of India states in article 15(4): "Nothing in [article 15] or in clause (2) of article 29 shall prevent the State from making any special provision for the advancement of any socially, and educationally backward classes of citizens of or for the Scheduled Castes and the Scheduled Tribes." Article 46 of the Constitution states that "The State shall promote with special care the educational and economic interests of the weaker sections of the people, and, in particular, of the Scheduled Castes and the Scheduled Tribes, and shall protect them from social injustice and all forms of exploitation."

The Supreme Court of India ruled in 1992 that reservations could not exceed 50 percent, anything above which it judged would violate equal access as guaranteed by the Constitution. It thus put a cap on reservations. However, the recent amendment of the constitution exceeds 50% and also there are state laws that exceed this 50 percent limit and these are under litigation in the Supreme Court. For example, in the State of Tamil Nadu, the caste-based reservation stands at 69 percent and applies to about 89 percent of the population.

On 7 November 2022, Supreme Court of India by a 3:2 verdict in Janhit Abhiyan vs Union Of India Writ Petition (Civil) No(S). 55 OF 2019, upheld the validity of the 103rd constitutional amendment carried out to provide legal sanction carve out 10% reservation for the economically weaker sections from unreserved classes for admission in educational institutions and government jobs and held that the 50% cap on quota is not inviolable and affirmative action on economic basis may go a long way in eradicating caste-based reservation. This constitutional amendment pushed the total reservation to 59.50% in central institutions.

On 1 August 2024, the Supreme Court of India ruled 6:1 in favor of permitting states to create sub-quotas for Scheduled Castes and Tribes within their reservation schemes. Chief Justice D.Y. Chandrachud stated that Article 14 of the Constitution of India should be interpreted to mean "that the same law should apply to those who are similarly situated." Justice Bela Trivedi provided the lone dissent, saying that states did not have the power to "tinker" with the 1950 Presidential List and that the sub-quotas violated Article 14. Justice B.R. Gavai concurred with Chief Justice Chandrachud, but added that the 'creamy layer' concept that applied to OBCs should apply to SC/ST groups as well.

== Reservation schemes ==
Reservations granted by the Union Government for government educational institutions and jobs
1. Unreserved (40.5%)
2. Economically Weaker Section (10.0%)
3. Other Backward Class (27.0%)
4. Scheduled Castes (15.0%)
5. Scheduled Tribes (7.50%)

=== In employment ===
Government and public sector will hire job seekers based on reservation percentage from two different categories :

1. Reservation category (SC, ST, OBC, EWS and other minorities)
2. Open category (General, SC, ST, OBC, EWS and other minorities).

While hiring, major priority is given to reservation category including 33% reservation for Women, priority in hiring is given by :

- Other minorities Women
- ST Women
- SC Women
- ST Men
- SC Men
- OBC Women
- OBC Men
- EWS Women
- EWS Men

and then after Open category will be considered.

Government and public sector hiring based on merit in open category and one more anomaly here i.e., priority in hiring is the same as for the reserved category.

The landmark initiative of Special Recruitment for Scheduled Caste and Scheduled Tribe in Government jobs was started in Kerala in 1972 by Vella Eacharan. The 1993 Supreme Court ruling in the Indra Sawhney & Others v. Union of India case said that reservations in job promotions are "unconstitutional" or not in accordance with the political constitution but allowed its continuation for five years.

In 1995, the 77th amendment to the Constitution was made to amend Article 16 before the five-year period expired to continue with reservations for SC/STs in promotions. It was further modified through the 85th amendment to give the benefit of consequential seniority to SC/ST candidates promoted by reservation.

The 81st amendment was made to the Constitution to permit the government to treat the backlog of reserved vacancies as a separate and distinct group, to which the ceiling of 50 per cent did not apply. The 82nd amendment inserted a provision in Article 335 to enable states to give concessions to SC/ST candidates in promotion.

The validity of all the above four amendments was challenged in the Supreme Court through various petitions clubbed together in M. Nagaraj & Others Vs. Union of India & Others, mainly on the ground that these altered the Basic Structure of the Constitution. In 2006, the Supreme Court upheld the amendments but stipulated that the concerned state will have to show, in each case, the existence of "compelling reasons" - which include "backwardness", "inadequacy of representation" and overall "administrative efficiency - before making provisions for reservation. The court further held that these provisions are merely enabling provisions. If a state government wishes to make provisions for reservation to SC/STs in the promotion, the state has to collect quantifiable data showing backwardness of the class and inadequacy of representation of that class.

In 2007, the Government of Uttar Pradesh introduced reservation in job promotions. However, citing the Supreme Court decision, the policy was ruled to be unconstitutional by the Allahabad High Court in 2011. The decision was challenged in the Supreme Court, which upheld it in 2012 by rejecting the government's argument because it failed to furnish sufficient valid data to justify the move to promote employees on a caste basis.

=== In education ===
Universities allot seats based on reservation percentage from the same two categories, that is :

1. Reservation category
2. Open category

Government Universities will allot based on the same priority as previously mentioned, along with, reservation percentage under consideration for entrance exams fees, for cut off marks, for allotment of seats and also applicable to other government schemes.

In India student aids are available for—SCs, STs, BCs, OBCs, women, Muslims, and other minorities. Only about 0.7% of student aids in India is based on merit.

=== States ===
In central-government funded higher education institutions, 22.5% of available seats are reserved for Scheduled Caste (SC) and Scheduled Tribe (ST) students (7.5% for STs, 15% for SCs). This reservation percentage has been raised to 49.5% by including an additional 27% reservation for OBCs. This ratio is followed even in Parliament and all elections where a few constituencies are earmarked for those from certain communities (which will next rotate in 2026 per the Delimitation Commission). Some states and UTs have reservations for females which varies from 5% to 33.33%.

Percentages of reservation for each state
State/UT	SC	ST	OBC	EWS	Other Reservations	Total
Andhra Pradesh	15	6	29	10		60
Andaman and Nicobar Islands		12	38			50
Arunachal Pradesh		80				80
Assam	7	12	27	10		56
Bihar	16	1	33	10		60
Chandigarh			27			27
Chhattisgarh	13	32	14	10		69
Dadra and Nagar Haveli and Daman and Diu	3	9	27			39
Delhi	15	7	27	10		59
Goa	2	12	27	10		51
Gujarat	7	14	27	10		58
Haryana	20		23	10		53
Himachal Pradesh	25	4	20	10		59
Jharkhand	10	26	14	10		60
Karnataka	15	3	32	10		60
Kerala	8	2	40	10		60
Lakshadweep		100				100
Madhya Pradesh	16	20	14	10		60
Maharashtra	13	7	32	10	1(Orphan)	63
Manipur	3	34	17			54
Meghalaya		80				80
Mizoram		80				80
Nagaland		80				80
Odisha	16	22	11	10		59
Puducherry	16		34			50
Punjab	29		12	10		51
Rajasthan	16	12	21	10	5 for MBC	64
Sikkim	7	18	40		20	85
Tamil Nadu	18	1	50			69
Telangana	15	10	29	10		64
Tripura	17	31	2	10		60
Uttar Pradesh	21	2	27	10		60
Uttarakhand	19	4	14	10		47
West Bengal	22	6	17	10		55

The exact percentages vary from state to state:

- In Tamil Nadu, OBC reservation is divided into 26.5% Backward Caste, 3.5 Backward Caste (M) and 20% Most Backward Caste and 10.5% sub quota for Vanniyars, introduced by AIADMK in 2020,7% for DNT. The 7.5% for Vanniyars was quashed void by Madras High Court. The SC quota has 3% sub-quota for Arunthatiyars, introduced by DMK in 2009.
- In Maharashtra in addition to the reservation for SC/ST/OBC, there is 2% for SBCs, 3% for Nomadic Tribes – NT-A (Vimukta jati), 2.5% for NT-B, 3.5% for NT-C (Dhangar), 2% for NT-D (Vanjari), 10% for SEBC (Maratha) and 1% for Orphan.
- In Northeast India, e.g. in Arunachal Pradesh, Meghalaya, Nagaland and Mizoram, reservation for ST in State Govt. jobs is 80% with only 20% unreserved. In the Central Universities of NEHU (Shillong) and Rajiv Gandhi University, 60% of seats are reserved for ST students.
- In West Bengal, the OBC community is divided into OBC A & B. In West Bengal there is no reservation on religious basis but some economically and educationally backward Muslim castes (basis surnames pertaining to different profession e.g. cobbler, weaver etc.) have been included along with their Hindu counterparts in the OBC list namely OBC A and OBC B, in both lists caste from both communities are there. But in higher educational institutes, till now there is no reservation for the OBC community but there is reservation in regard to admission in primary, secondary and higher secondary studies.

== Gender ==
=== Women ===
The Women's Reservation Bill was passed by the Rajya Sabha on 9 March 2010 by a majority vote of 186 members in favor and 1 against. As of March 2013, the Lok Sabha has not voted on the bill. Critics say gender cannot be held as a basis for reservation alone other factors should also be considered e.g. economic, social conditions of woman candidates especially when applying reservation for educated women. The criticism points that the policy benefits women that have access to political capital through family circles and are faced with the burden of a huge learning curve. Again, women are divided among caste and class lines with this dichotomy playing an important role in deciding how the presence of women in the lowest tier of governance impact the problems faced by the women of the constituency

In Gujarat and Andhra Pradesh, 32% of posts are reserved for females in all government departments and services, such as police, health, education and general administration. From 2015 onwards Kerala has implemented a 55% reservation for all posts of its local self governing bodies.

On 28 September 2023, the One Hundred and Sixth Amendment of the Constitution of India was given ascension after having been introduced during the Special Session of the Parliament of India. The amendment seeks to allocate 33 percent of the seats in the Lok Sabha and elected state legislative assemblies for women.

=== Transgender and non-binary people ===
In 2017, a drafting committee in Karnataka crafted a policy to create a 1% reservation for transgender people in education and employment. On 21 July 2021, Karnataka implemented the policy, making the state the first in the country to provide one percent reservation for the transgender community in all government services. The government submitted a report to the High Court in this regard, informing that a notification had already been issued after amending the Karnataka Civil Service. The job could be given to cisgender people, from the same category, in case of the non-availability of transgender candidates.

On April 6, 2015, the Tamil Nadu government's BCC Department issued a government order classifying transgender persons under Other Backward Class status as a caste identity if lacking a community certificate. In June 2024, the Madras High Court struck down the order and directed the Tamil Nadu government to provide 1% horizontal reservations to the transgender community in education and employment, ruling that the GO violated Articles 14, 15, 16, 19 and 21 of the Constitution of India, as well as the National Legal Services Authority v. Union of India verdict.

In June 2024, the Calcutta High Court ordered the government of West Bengal to establish a 1% quota in public employment.

== Religion ==
While courts have ruled that reservations on the basis of religion are unconstitutional, several state governments have allotted reservations to religious minorities or backward classes among religious minorities on the basis of socio-educational backwardness and representation.

The Tamil Nadu government has allotted 3.5% of seats each to Muslims and Christians, thereby altering the OBC reservation to 23% from 30% (since it excludes persons belonging to Other Backward Castes who are either Muslims or Christians).

The Government of Andhra Pradesh introduced a law enabling 4 percent reservations for Muslims in 2004. This law was upheld by the Supreme Court in an interim order in 2010 but it constituted a Constitution bench to look further into the issue. The referral was to examine the constitutional validity of quotas based on religion. Kerala Public Service Commission has a quota of 12% for Muslims. Religious minority (Muslim or Christian) educational institutes also have 50% reservation for Muslim or Christian religions. The Central government has listed a number of Muslim communities as backward Muslims, making them eligible for reservation.

== Criticism, controversies, and protests ==
The Union Government on 22 December 2011 announced the establishment of a sub-quota of 4.5% for religious minorities within the existing 27% reservation for Other Backward Classes. The reasoning given was that Muslim communities that have been granted OBC status are unable to compete with Hindu OBC communities. It was alleged that the decision was announced as the Election Commission announced Assembly elections in five states on 24 December 2011. The government would not have been able to announce this due to the model code of conduct. On 12 January 2012, the Election Commission stayed implementation of this decision for violation of the model code of conduct. Later, Justice Sachar, head of the Sachar Committee that was commissioned to prepare a report on the latest social, economic and educational condition of the Muslim community of India, criticised the government decision, saying "Such promises will not help the backward section of minorities. It is like befooling them. These people are making tall claims just to win elections". He suggested that instead of promising to give reservations, the government should focus on basic issues of improving administration and governance.

On 28 May 2012, the Andhra Pradesh High Court quashed the sub-quota. The court said that the sub-quota has been carved out only on religious lines and not on any other intelligible basis. The court criticized the decision: "In fact, we must express our anguish at the rather casual manner in which the entire issue has been taken up by the central government.".

=== Mandal Commission protests of 1990 ===
Mandal commission protests of 1990 were against reservation in government jobs based on caste in India.

=== 2006 Indian anti-reservation protests ===
The 2006 Indian anti-reservation protests were a series of protests that took place in India in 2006 in opposition to the decision of the Union Government of India, led by the Indian National Congress-headed multiparty coalition United Progressive Alliance, to implement reservations for the Other Backward Classes (OBCs) in central and private institutes of higher education. This move led to massive protests, particularly from students and doctors belonging to the forward castes, who claimed that the government's proposal was discriminatory, discarded meritocracy and was driven by vote-bank politics.

=== Agitations demanding more reservation ===
In 2008 and 2010, the Gujjar community in Rajasthan demanded reclassification from OBC to ST (Scheduled Tribes) for increased reservation benefits. They began violently protesting on the streets of Rajasthan and blocked several rail lines. Police firing on Gujjars began a tit-for-tat cycle of violence between Police and Gujjars. The violence ended with 37 people dead. Their move was opposed by the Meenas, the main ST community in Rajasthan.

In 2019, the agitation restarted as Gujjars demanded 5% reservation, and began blocking trains to this effect.

Jats have been demanding OBC status since the 1990s. In 2016, they began an agitation to get this status. To this effect they began protesting by blockading roads and lines, but later the protests turned violent. Riots spread to Delhi and western Uttar Pradesh, and even Rajasthan. The epicentre of the violence was in Rothak, and almost ₹34000 crores ($4.8 billion) worth of property was damaged and 30 were killed. Bowing to the pressure, the Haryana government created a special category for Jats and other upper castes called BC, and appointed 10% reservation, but the measure was blocked in court.

Beginning in 2015, the Patidar community (better known as Patel) began agitating for OBC status in Gujarat. This movement consisted of massive demonstrations across the state, led by Hardik Patel. Later many of these protests turned violent, resulting in curfews across the state and crores worth of damage. Talks with the government broke down, and the violence restarted. After the Jat agitation began in 2016, the Patidars flared up again and led a march through Gujarat, but protests in several cities turned violent and the Rapid Action Force was sent in.

In January 2016, the Kapu community in Andhra Pradesh began leading protests to be classified in Backward Classes. The agitation became violent when in Tuni, Kapu protestors set trains on fire. In 2019, the Telugu Desam Party which had just been made opposition, tabled a bill to have a 5% sub-quota for Kapus out of EWS reservation.

Marathas, the dominant caste of Maharashtra, have been agitating for OBC status since the 1990s. In 2016, after the rape and murder of a 15-year old Maratha girl in Kopardi, the Maratha community organized massive protests throughout Maharashtra. Their demands included death for the accused as well as reservations for the Maratha community which makes up around 30% of the state's population. Some road blocks turned violent in 2017 and 2018, but overall the protests were peaceful. Their demand was met when the Maharashtra government instituted a special SEBC (Socially and Educationally Backward Classes) category for them with 16% reservation. The Supreme Court of India later however, declared the SEBC reservation for Marathas as unconstitutional.

Brahmins (8-10% of Maharashtra), under the group Samast Brahmin Samaj have protested in Mumbai, Pune & Sambhaji Nagar been put forth 15 demands including "additional 4% reservations under EWS" and a fixed pension of Rs.5000 for their community citing the 'rise of economical backwardness amongst them and unemployment with only have 120 days of work'.

== Economic status ==
The Union Government tabled the Constitution (One Hundred And Twenty-Fourth Amendment) Bill, 2019 which provided 10% additional quota for the economically weaker sections amongst the erstwhile unreserved category students. The definition of 'economically weaker sections' will be defined by the State from time to time. The constitutional amendment has laid down that they will be restricted to people with household income less than 8 Lakh per annum and those who own agricultural land below five acres. Business Today has commented that these criteria cover almost 100 percent of the population. Several petitions have been filed before the Supreme Court of India challenging the legality of this amendment.

== Exclusions ==
In the reservation system in India, the central government notifies castes as SC, ST, or OBC categories based on socio-historical background, while exclusion from reservation benefits is determined by an individual's socio-economic status, nativeness, and religion. For SC and ST individuals, pre-exclusion criteria are employed, while post-exclusion criteria are used for OBCs.

- For ST individuals, the following categories are not entitled to benefit from the reservation system:
  - Immigration from a Scheduled State/UT to a non-Scheduled State/UT. (Note: a). If an individual has migrated recently and temporarily, they can't claim reservation in respect to the migrated state/UT but can claim it in respect to the state/UT of origin. b). If individuals have migrated permanently in the recent past and have a notable population of the community in the migrated state/UT, the community is mostly notified as OBC or, in some cases, as SC.)
- For SC individuals, the following categories are not entitled to benefit from the reservation system:
  - Immigration from a Scheduled State/UT to a non-Scheduled State/UT.
  - Professing religions other than Hinduism, Buddhism, and Sikhism. (Note: SC individuals who have converted to Christianity or its progeny generally fall into OBC categories in most states.)
- For OBC's people the following categories are not entitled to take advantage of the reservation system:
  - Children of officials in high office as per the Constitution. (Note: Included among the high office holders are the President of India, the Vice-President of India, Judges of the Supreme Court of India, the High Courts chairman, the members of Union Public Service Commission, members of the State Public Service Commission, Chief Election Commissioner, Comptroller Auditor-General of India or any person holding positions of a constitutional nature.)
  - Children of civil servants in high positions. (Note: Included among this category are Class I or Class II officers, unless dead or incapacitated. The criteria used for Group A and B are the same as the employees of the Public sector.)
  - Children of armed forces officers of high rank. (Note: High ranks include the rank of colonel and above in the army or in equivalent posts in the Navy, the Air Force, and the Paramilitary Force. But that will hold true provided that-: 1. "the wife of an armed forces officer is herself in the armed forces (i.e., the category under consideration) the rule of exclusion will apply only when she herself has reached the rank of Colonel."; 2. "the service ranks below Colonel of husband and wife shall not be clubbed together"; 3. "if the wife of an officer in the armed forces is in civil employment, this will not be taken into account for applying the rule of exclusion unless she falls in the service category under item No.II in which case the criteria and conditions")
  - Children of professionals and those engaged in trade and industry. (Note: If a person has a high paying job such as physician, lawyer, chartered accountant, income tax consultant, financial or management consultant, dental surgeon, engineer, architect, computer specialist, film artist or other film professionals, author, playwright, sports person, sports professional, media professional or any other vocations of like status. If the husband holds one of the above jobs and the wife does not then the husband's income will be taken into consideration and if the wife holds one of the above jobs then the wife's income will be taken into consideration. The income of the family as a whole will be taken into account because the whole point of the reservation system is to raise the social status of the people that belong to the SC's, ST's and OBCs and if a family's income is high already it is considered that it raises their social status as well.)
  - Children of property owners. (Note: Included in this category are those who have irrigated land area which is equal to or more than 85% of the statutory ceiling area will be excluded from the reservation. They would only be under reservation if the land is exclusively unirrigated. Those with vacant buildings can use them for residential, industrial or commercial purposes, hence they are not covered under reservations.)
  - Children of people with annual income exceeding ₹8,00,000 (Note: This income does not include salaried income and agricultural income) (regarded as the "creamy layer").

Institutions of Excellence, research institutions, Institutions of National and Strategic Importance such as Centre for Development of Advanced Computing, Homi Bhabha National Institute and its ten constituent units, the Tata Institute of Fundamental Research (Mumbai), the North Eastern Indira Gandhi Regional Institute of Health and Medical Sciences (Shillong), Physical Research Laboratory (Ahmedabad), the Vikram Sarabhai Space Centre (Thiruvananthapuram) and the Indian Institute of Remote Sensing (Dehradun) do not have reservations for higher education. (Note: Such institutions include the Centre for Development of Advanced Computing, Homi Bhabha National Institute and its ten constituent units, the Tata Institute of Fundamental Research (Mumbai), the North Eastern Indira Gandhi Regional Institute of Health and Medical Sciences (Shillong), Physical Research Laboratory (Ahmedabad), the Vikram Sarabhai Space Centre (Thiruvananthapuram) and the Indian Institute of Remote Sensing (Dehradun).) However Institutes of National Importance such as Indian Institutes of Management (IIMs),Indian Institutes of Technology (IITs), National Institutes of Technology (NIT) and Indian Institute of Information Technology (IIIT) have provision of reservation in admission process for undergraduate and graduate programs.

On 27 October 2015, the Supreme Court directed the state and the Central governments to end the regional quota and to ensure that super-specialty medical courses are kept "unreserved, open and free" from any domicile status after the court had allowed petitions files by some MBBS doctors.

	Scheduled Caste (SC)	Scheduled Tribe (ST)	Other Backward Classes (OBC)	Economically Weaker Section (EWS)
1. Reservation % of Government of India.	15%	7.5%	27%	10%
2. Is the criteria of 'Government Jobs' applicable to this category for reservation eligibility?	Not Applicable.	Not Applicable.	Applicable. Children of governmental staff belonging to 'Group A' or equivalent categories are not eligible for OBC reservation. There are some criteria for 'Group B' staff also.	Not Applicable.
3. Is the criteria of 'Income Limit' applicable to this category for reservation eligibility?	Not Applicable.	Not Applicable.	Applicable. Annual family (other) income of 8 lakhs. Only 'Other Income' is considered. Salary and agricultural income not included while calculating annual family income.	Applicable. Those with 'Annual family income of 8 lakhs' and above are not eligible. While calculating annual family income, all types of income – (including salary and agricultural income) are included.
4. Is the criteria of 'Limit on agricultural land' applicable to this category for reservation eligibility?	Not Applicable	Not Applicable.	Not Applicable.	Applicable. Those families with '5 acres of agricultural land and above' are not eligible.
5. Is the criteria of 'Limit on residential flat area' applicable to this category for reservation eligibility?	Not Applicable.	Not Applicable.	Not Applicable.	Applicable. Those with 'Residential flat of 1000 sq. ft and above' are not eligible.
6. Is the criteria of 'Limit on residential plot area' applicable to this category for reservation eligibility?	Not Applicable.	Not Applicable.	Not Applicable.	Applicable. Those families with 'Residential plot of 100 sq. yards and above in notified municipalities' are not eligible. Those families with 'Residential plot of 200 sq. yards and above in other areas' are not eligible.
7. Is this reserved category eligible for the seats of (merit/ non-reserved) category?	Yes	Yes	Yes	Yes
8. Is the general category (non-reserved/ merit) eligible to apply in this reserved category?	No	No	No	No
Note: The above table is valid as of January 31, 2023.

== Creamy layer ==
The term creamy layer was first coined in 1974 in the State of Kerala vs N. M. Thomas case when Justice VR Krishna Iyer said that the "benefits of the reservation shall be snatched away by the top creamy layer of the backward class, thus leaving the weakest among the weak and leaving the fortunate layers to consume the whole of the cake".

The 1992 Indra Sawhney & Others v. Union of India judgement laid down the limits of the state's powers: it upheld the ceiling of 50.21 percent quotas, emphasised the concept of "social backwardness", and prescribed 11 indicators to ascertain backwardness. The judgement also established the concept of qualitative exclusion, such as "creamy layer". The creamy layer applies only to OBCs.

The creamy layer criteria were introduced at Rs 1 lakh in 1993 and revised to Rs 2.5 lakh in 2004, ₹4.5 lakh in 2008 and ₹6 lakh in 2013, but now the ceiling has been raised to ₹8 lakh (in September 2017). In October 2015, the National Commission for Backward Classes (NCBC) proposed that a person belonging to OBC with an annual family income of up to ₹15 lakh should be considered as minimum ceiling for OBC.

The NCBC also recommended sub-division of OBCs into "backward", "more backward" and "extremely backward" groups and to divide the 27 per cent quota amongst them in proportion to their population, to ensure that stronger OBCs do not corner the quota benefits.

== Reservation in states ==
Andhra Pradesh

Andhra Pradesh state percentage of reservation is around 50%. Including the overall 1/3 reservation for women, 66.66% of seats are reserved in Andhra Pradesh in education and government jobs.

• Scheduled Castes – 15% • Scheduled Tribes – 6% • Backward Classes (A, B, C, D) – 27% • Physically Handicapped (Blind, Deaf & Dumb and OPH) – 3% (1% each) • Ex-servicemen (APMS only) – 1% (0.5% in general category) • Women – 33.33% (in all categories, means 16.66% in general category)

Andhra Pradesh BC quota has sub-quotas for castes, classified in A, B, C and D. Addition of disabled, ex-serviceman, women in general category 16.66% makes total reservation percentage 66.66%.

Arunachal Pradesh

Arunachal Pradesh has 80% reservation for Scheduled Tribes.

Assam

• Scheduled Castes – 7% • Scheduled Tribes – 12% • Other Backward Classes – 27% • Economically Weaker Sections – 10%

Assam provides sub quotas for several other communities such as Morans, Mataks and Tea Tribes in medical colleges under the OBC category. In November 2020, Assam's cabinet extended this reservation to Koch-Rajbongshis, Ahoms and Chutias. These six communities are demanding Scheduled Tribe status.

In January 2019, Assam approved EWS reservation.

Bihar

• Scheduled Castes – 20% • Scheduled Tribes – 2% • Other Backward Classes – 43% • Economically Weaker Sections – 10%

First implemented in 1970 by Karpoori Thakur, Bihar has a sub-quota within OBC quota of 18% for Extremely Backward Castes (EBCs) and 3% for Backward Caste women in government jobs and educational institutes. EWS reservation was implemented in 2019.

The Reservation in the State of Bihar was increased on 9 November 2023.With the existing 10% quota for Economically Weaker Sections (EWS), the effective quota will be 75%. The main beneficiaries are the EBCs and OBCs, whose quota is proposed to be raised from 12% to 25% and 8% to 18% respectively. According to 2022 Bihar caste-based survey, 36.01% of the population are EBCs, and 27.13% are OBCs.For SCs, the proposed new quota is 20%, up from the existing 14%. The SC population is estimated at 19.65%. The quota for STs, however, is proposed to be slashed from 10% to 2%. With most of the tribal areas going to Jharkhand after the bifurcation of Bihar in 2000, the tribal population in Bihar is less than 2%.

Chhattisgarh

• Scheduled Castes – 12% ( now 16%) • Scheduled Tribes – 32% ( now 20%) • Other Backward Classes – 14% • Economically Weaker Sections – no provision

Chhattisgarh: Ordinance on OBC quota hike to 27% has lapsed, says high court.

Delhi

• Scheduled Castes - 15% • Scheduled Tribes - 7% • Other Backward Classes - 27%

Since Delhi is a Union territory and subject to the Central government, government jobs in Delhi are designated Central Government jobs. In a 2018 Supreme Court decision, it was decided that since Delhi is the capital and no one is an "outsider" there reservations in the territory should follow the all-India pattern. Furthermore, these reserved jobs are open from reserved communities from outside Delhi.

Goa

• Scheduled Castes – 2% • Scheduled Tribes – 12% • Other Backward Classes – 27% • Economically Weaker Sections – 10% • Physically handicapped - 3% • Ex-servicemen - 2% • Sportspersons - 3%

In 2014, the quota for OBC reservation was raised from 19.5% to 27%. In June 2019, Goa implemented EWS reservation in jobs and education.

Gujarat

• Scheduled Castes – 7% • Scheduled Tribes – 15% • Other Backward Classes – 27% • Economically Weaker Sections – 10%

Gujarat also implemented a 33% reservation for general category women in government jobs. The government also banned reserved category applicants from competing for general category seats, but this was revoked in 2020. Similarly the women reservation was made cutting across all categories in 2020. Gujarat was one of the first states to implement EWS reservation, which applies to general category candidates with less than ₹8 lakhs income, not including other assets like land.

Haryana

• Scheduled Castes – 20% • Other Backward Classes – 23% • Economically Weaker Sections – 10% • Ex-servicemen – 5% • Sportspersons – 3% • Physically handicapped – 3%

In Haryana OBCs are divided into A, B, C categories, each with 11%, 6% and 6% reservation respectively. Reservations in promotions are different, although still based on population. In 2021, Haryana passed a law mandating 75% reservation in private-sector jobs with incomes less than ₹25,000 for local candidates. However, the Punjab and Haryana High Court has quashed this law in 2023 asserting it was unconstitutional.

Himachal Pradesh

• Scheduled Castes – 25% • Scheduled Tribes – 4% • Other Backward Classes – 20% • Economically Weaker Sections – 10%

In the Scheduled Areas which have a very high percentage of STs, such as Kinnaur and Lahaul and Spiti districts, percentage of ST reserved seats in government jobs are much higher.

Jharkhand

• Scheduled Castes – 10% • Scheduled Tribes – 26% • Other Backward Classes – 14% • Economically Weaker Sections – 10%

BC are currently classified as being in Annexure 1 and Annexure 2.

Maharashtra

• Scheduled Castes (SC) (13%) • Scheduled Tribes (ST) (7%) • Other Backward Classes (OBC) (19%) • • Special Backward Classes (SBC) (2%) • • Nomadic Tribes – A (Vimukta jati) (3%) • • Nomadic Tribes – B (2.5%) • • Nomadic Tribes – C (Dhangar) (3.5%) • • Nomadic Tribes – D (Vanjari) (2%) • Economically Weaker Sections (EWS) – 10%

Maharashtra has 62% reservation in educational institutions and government jobs.

Uttarakhand

• Scheduled Castes – 19% • Scheduled Tribes – 4% • Other Backward Classes – 14% • Economically Weaker Sections – 10%

Uttarakhand has 47% reservation in educational institutions and government jobs. In addition to vertical reservation, the state gives 30% horizontal reservation to women, 5% to the ex-servicemen (ES), 4% to persons with disability (PWD), 2% to the dependants of freedom fighters (DFF), and 5% to the orphans residing in the state-run orphanages.

== See also ==
- Nari Shakti Vandan Adhiniyam
- Backwardism
- Caste: The Origins of Our Discontents
- Court cases related to reservation in India
- Forward caste
- Reservation policy in Bihar
- Reserved political positions in India
- Caste politics
- Reservation policy in Tamil Nadu
- Jat reservation agitation
- Reverse discrimination in India
