= Benavara =

Village in Kunigal Taluk, Karnataka, India

Benavara is a small farming village in Kunigal Taluk, Tumkur district, Karnataka State, India. It is located at a distance of about 100 km (driving distance) from the state capital, Bangalore.

== Geography ==
Benavara is located at +12° 50' 23.95" N, +76° 56' 2.96" E at an altitude of 780 meters above the mean sea level. It is in the Simsha basin of Cauvery River in the southern border of Tumkur District; a plain area with a hillock in it called Thimmappana betta atop the hill adored by Lord Thimmappa with a small temple built in Hoysala style in 15th or 16th century but, rebuilt in its original style in 2007–08. It is nestled in between the Taluks Gubbi to north, Magadi to east, Maddur to south and Nagamangala to west. Nearby towns include Amruthur, Huliyurdurga, Maddur, Mandya and Nagamangala; and nearby famous religious institutions like Yediyur Siddlingeswara temple/ Mutt and Sri Adichunchanagiri Mutt.

== Transportation. ==
Benavara village is connected by PMGSY road to State Highway No. 84 between Tumkur and Mandya via Amruthur and Kunigal. SH 84 was upgraded in to double road connecting NH.48 near Yadiyur and to Mandya via Amruthuru in 2018 improving the connectivity to neighbouring villages and cities. NH 48 between Bangalore and Hassan is 25 km from the village. The village has frequent bus services from Kunigal, Magadi, Negamangala, Mandya, Bangalore, Tumkur and Mysore. The village is 100 km from Bangalore and 90 km from Mysore.

The railway line between Hassan and Bangalore passes through Yediyur and Kunigal and a station has been planned at Yedyur which is 15 km from Benavara. The Railway line is operational since 2018.

== Economy ==
Benavara is in the command area of Markonahalli Reservoir built across Shimsha River at the confluence of Rivers Shimsha and Bellur at Markonahalli in Kunigal Tq in the 1940s; till then it was dry belt dependent on scanty rains. Now, most of the lands are irrigated assured with water from further connection to a bigger reservoir across Hemavati River. The economy is predominantly agrarian with paddy as main crop supplemented by ragi (millet) crop as staple food as well as commercial crop. There are coconut and arecanut plantations in small patches dotting the village. Due to frequent failure of rains and non assurance of regular water from Markonahalli dam to fields, farmers go for bore-wells and end with despair due to the stony under ground strata of the earth that do not yield ground water in bore wells in 3/4th area of the village and uncertain electricity in rural areas. Now, the farmers depend mainly on monsoon rains for water to the Markonahalli dam and to crops, since Hemavathi waters is not assured as planned due to many reasons in spite of the efforts of GoK.

Animal husbandry like rearing of sheep and goats is economical in small scale along with rearing of draught animals for use in agriculture is the second occupation of the farming community in the village.

The mechanization of agriculture is yet take off in this area and the village except tractor for ploughing/ transportation and machines for trashing of paddy. Machines for sowing, transplanting, weeding, spraying of pesticides and harvest etc. are yet to invade this area.

== Demography and education ==
Benavara is a village with about 100 houses with population of around 500 due to migration of most of the youths to cities mostly to Bangalore on jobs in government service and in private firms since the agriculture is not remunerative. One or the other from each house is in Benaglore either for earning or for education. There is a hamlet called Benavara Koppalu attached to this village right on the SH 84, about 1 km away from the main village.

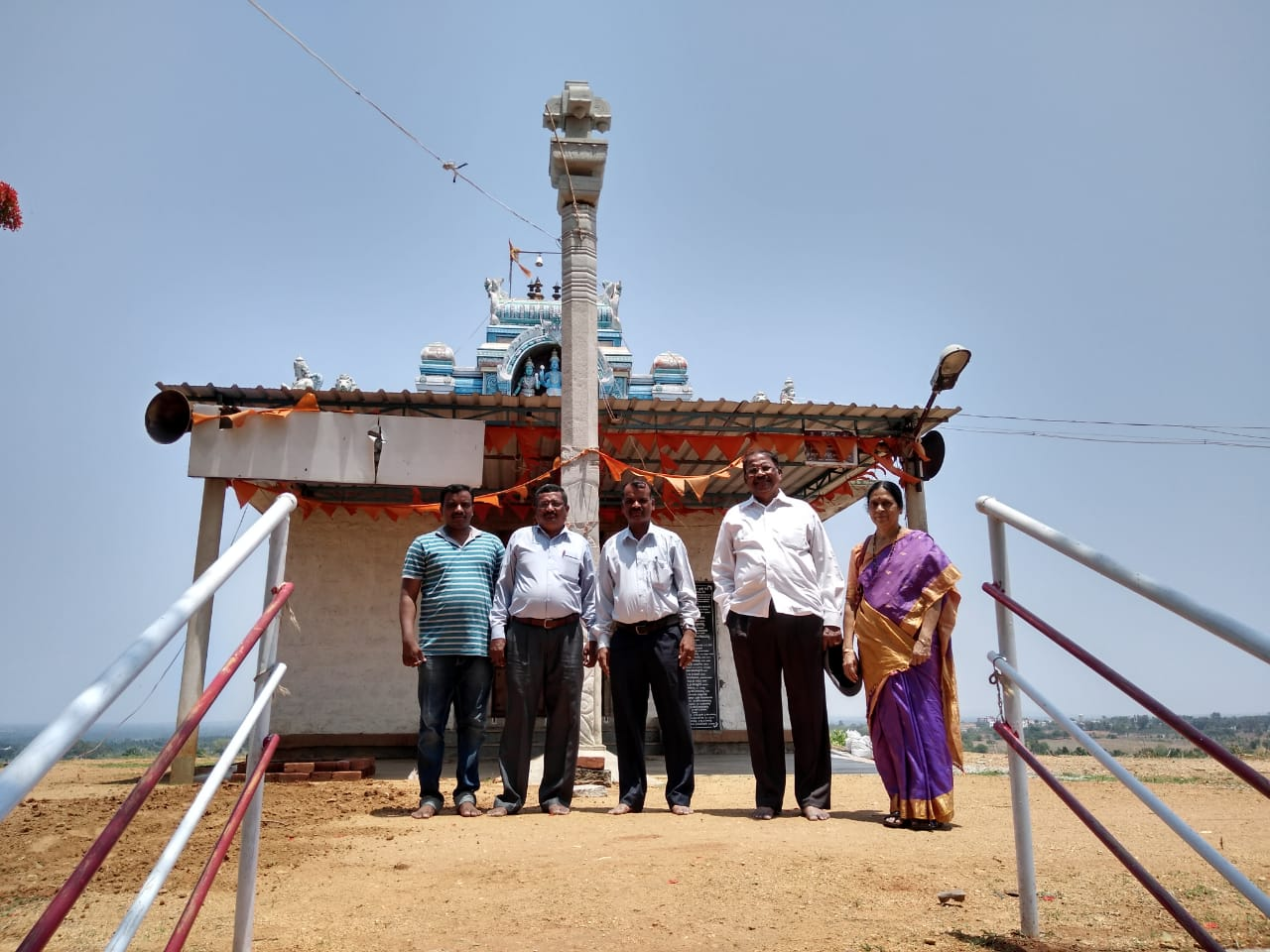
Bettada Timmappa devotees

This village has a reputation of having a govt primary school since pre-independence compare to neighbour villages, but, still remains with the same school. There were literates in the village among the generation of the 1900s. Anganavadi (a nursery) is the only addition since the 1970s due to limitation in population. The Govt. Middle School, at adjoining Hanchipura was only the school after Independence for higher primary education till such time only 3 students went out to pursue education in Tumkur and happened to join govt service in the 1950s. Then, a H S was opened in 1963 at Yedavani till then students had to go out to cities/ towns for high schools. Since the 2000s there is a High School at Valagerepura close to the village and Junior college at Amruthur and degree college at Kunigal with a lot of bus facilities.

This village had the blessings/ guidance of the reputed social workers/ politicians/educationists hailed from the adjoining village M A colony late H M Gangadharaiah, MLC the founder of Siddhartha Engg and Medical colleges, Tumkur in the 1950s and Late M H Jayaprakash Mayayan, MLA and founder of Dr Ambedkar Engg College, Bengaluru from 1967 to 1994; who did their best to guide the villagers in the field of importance of education and its importance in social, economical and political upliftment through it.

== Climate, flora and fauna ==
Climatically Benavara falls in dry weather zone, where the rainfall is about 400 mm from both the monsoons. The SW monsoon is always low with some showers in May–June since the village is in rain shadow area. It receives some good showers from NE monsoon in September–November. The temperature goes up to 38 °C in summer and falls to 15 °C in winter. Droughts are common, but not experienced much due to the irrigation facility available from Markonahalli dam.

Flora: The vegetation of the village is dry deciduous stunted growth with lofty trees like bevu, arali, basari, goni, mavu, honge, gobali, tabasi, halasu, hunase, and bidiru in cultivated fields. The common natural undergrowths are Haale, kare, chittunde, mundagalli, ekka, tumbe, tangadi, and bandarike with variety of grasses palatable to the cattle. The exotic weeds like Eupatorium and parthenium are invading the area through the waters of Hemavathi since the 2010s and looks menacing affecting the farming and the fodder source of cattle. Lantana is also common The Ipomia weed in water bodies is also menacing affecting the quality of water.

Fauna of the village is interesting, one can see jackal and wild boar if he is lucky in the early mornings near the hillock. Mongoose, squirrel, hare, rats, blandy coot are common. Reptiles seen are cobra, water snake, green snake, viper, monitor lizard, varieties of lizards, chamelian etc., varieties of frogs, fishes also common. Birds seen are brahminy kite, pariah kite, vultures have become rare, pheasant crow, crows, partridge, mina, warblers, wagtile, redwattled lapwing, pea fowl, black ibis, adjutant crane, egrets, duck, heron, cormorant, coot, baya, house sparrow etc.

== Religious and cultural activities ==
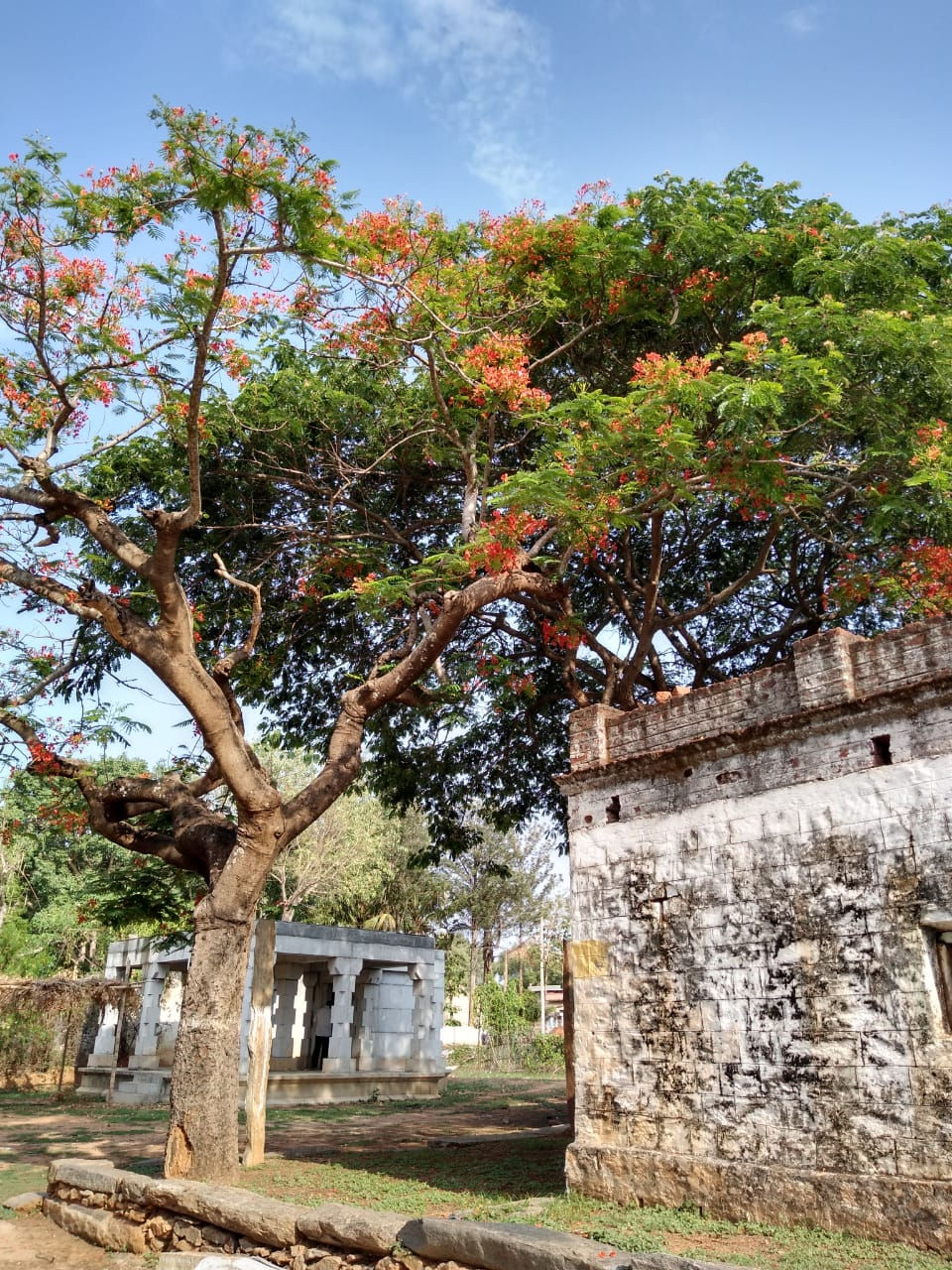
Chennakeshava temple

Hinduism is the predominant religion in Benavara with three main castes, namely Dalits, Akkasaliga and Vakkaliga. Dalits are the majority caste and the village is mostly represented by Dalits in all walks of life. The resident Dalits faced a lot of persecution and discrimination from the neighboring villages till recently. Now discrimination on the basis of caste and creed is almost non existent. Since the turn of this century, there have been many graduates, engineers and doctors from this village.

Religious activities in this village are in accordance to Hindu customs and traditions. The village is home for two famous temples in the locality, one dedicated to Goddess Pattaladamma, popularly called Benavaradamma and the other to Goddess Arivinamaramma. These goddesses are believed to be sisters. Pattaladamma is the incarnation of Goddess Parvathi and has devotees from 7 villages including Benavara, who are said to be from this village and migrated to other villages in the centuries ago. Such neighboring villages are Valagaerepura, Keelara, Hanchipura, Chendanahalli, Kuppe and Shettipura. All these villages have allegiance to these Goddesses and they perform all religious ceremonies.

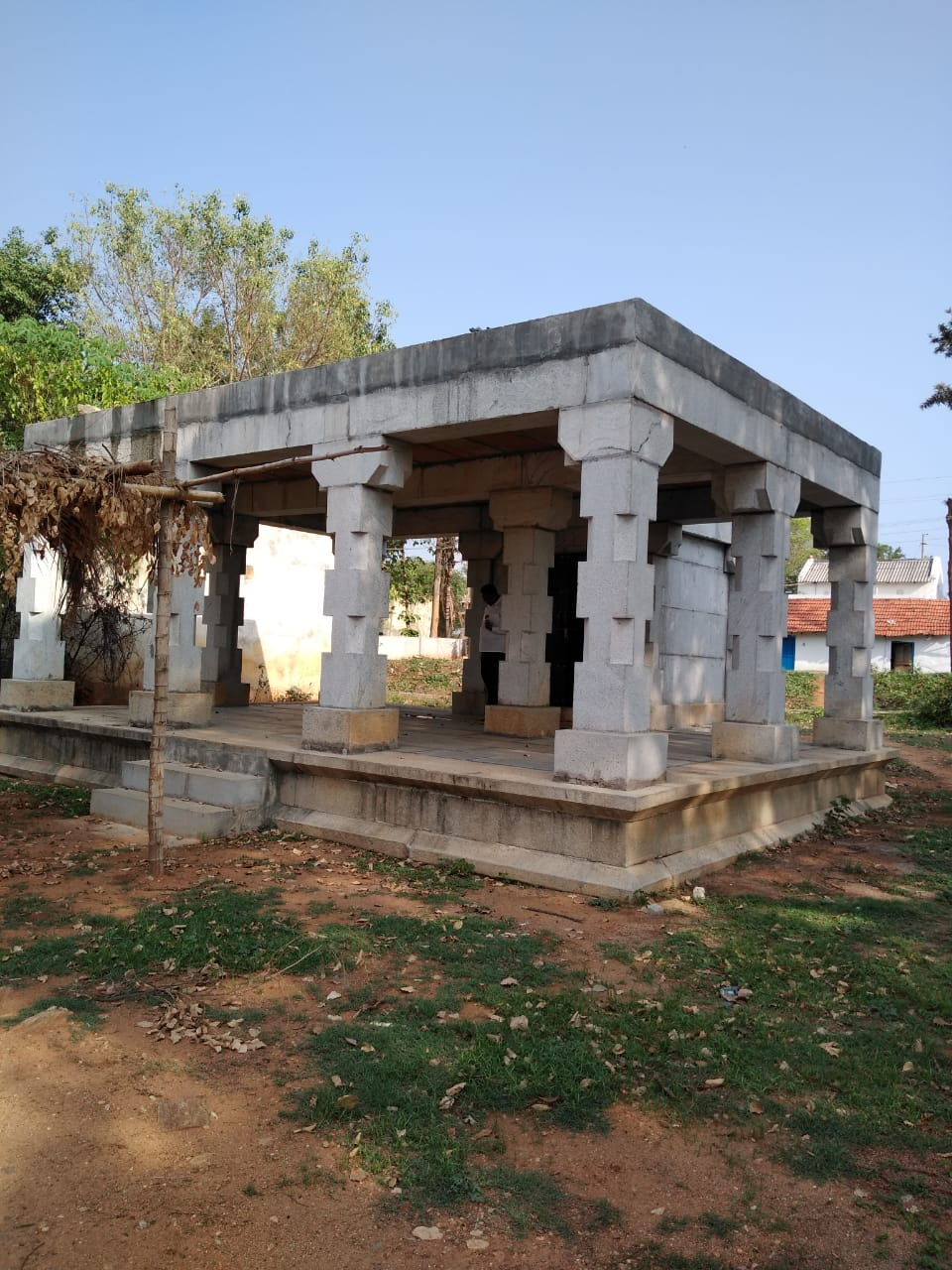
Marigudi

The devotees from these villages perform the annual festival that falls in the middle of Chaitra masa. The festival is celebrated for 3 days starting on a Friday and ending on a Sunday. Two days are meant for Pattaladamma and one day for Arivinamaramma. People for all neighbouring villages except Kuppe and Settipura attend the festival. Ceremonies are performed with a Kurju, a Chariot; Pooje- a rectangular frame made of bamboo, decorated with 7 Kalasas on top and a mask of the Goddess in the center assembled on a stand, Gindi- a bronze pot placed decorated with colourful jewels, clothes and flowers, usually placed on the head of a devotee; and Patas, bamboo poles wrapped with colourful bands of cloth. The procession passes through the village thoroughfare, accompanied by a band of drummers and pipers with devotees dancing to the tune of the drums.

On the first day, which is a Friday, one cart load of firewood from each of the 5 villages arrives at the temple premises at noon along with a procession of dancing devotees. The firewood is stacked in an elongated fire pit called Konda in front of the temple. Firewood is then lit in the evening and by morning, the pit is ready for fire walkers. The head priest and one Gudda, devotees who carry the Pooje, from each of the participating villages walk on the fire with Pooje on their head. Prayers are offered to the Goddess throughout the day followed by a night of revelry with devotees singing folk songs and dancing to the beats of drums. The festivities culminate in a spectacular display of fireworks just before dawn which draws a huge crowd from all neighboring villages.

The second day which is a Saturday is called is "Jatre" (village fair). Processions like the ones described above are carried out in the afternoon and end with the Sun set. Till the 1980s, the day use to end with a ceremony called Doolamari where in the devotees used to sacrifice animals like sheep and goats in the name of the goddess. The sacrifice was performed in such a way that it used to instill fear in the hearts and minds of the devotees who saw the ceremony. The head priest would work himself into a trance and claiming that he had been possessed by the goddess, would kill the sacrificial animals one after the other by biting at gullet and drinking the blood. This practice is now banned.

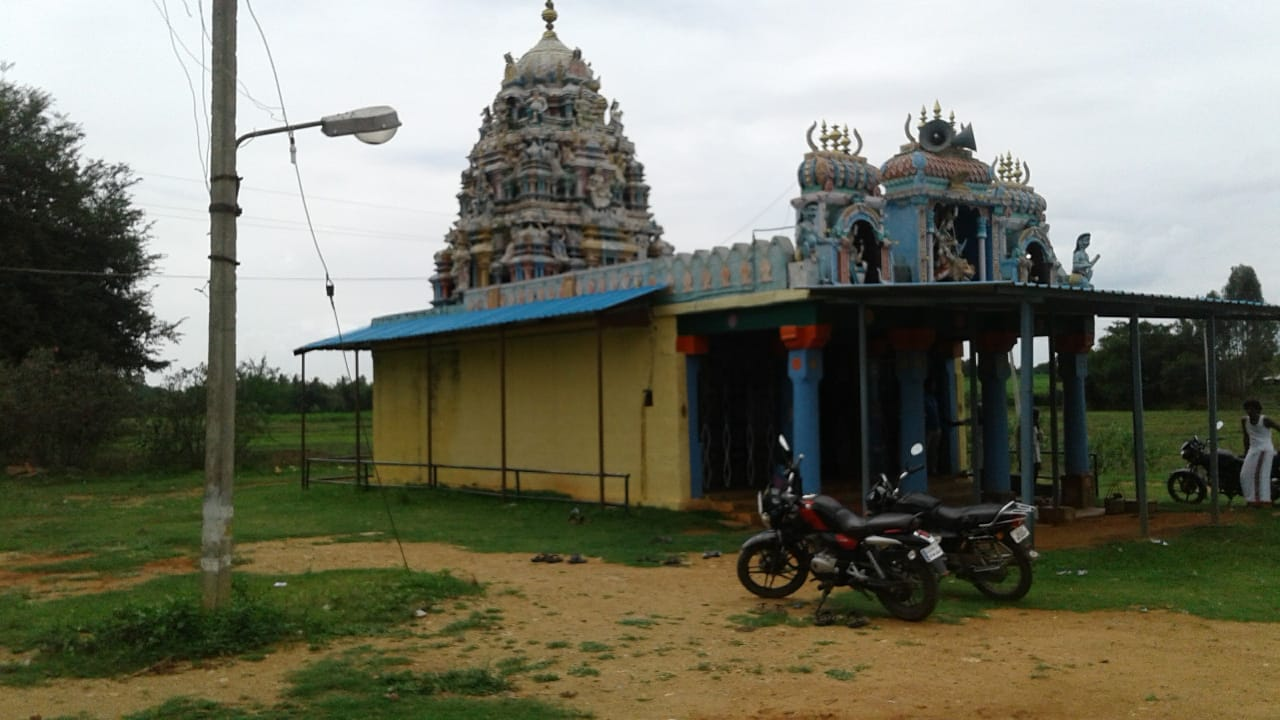
Sri Arivina Maramma temple

The third day which is a Sunday is again a day of Jatre, dedicated to Goddess Arivina Maramma, a powerful goddess believed to be younger sister of Goddess Pattaladamma. This day is also marked by animals sacrifices performed by devotees who make the offerings to appease the Goddess. Most of people from the above villages and natives who have settled in other cities visit this temple during the Jatre. All households prepare and serve sumptuous non vegetarian food on this day.

The priests of these temples are from the fishermen community and are not Brahmins as one would expect. Temples open weekly on Fridays and attract lot of devotees. These temples are managed by a committee of "Dharmadharshees" represented from all the seven villages. Untouchability was practiced against Dalits in these temples too till the 1970s. With rise in literacy levels among the youth of the village, untouchability is on the decline and is almost nonexistent now.

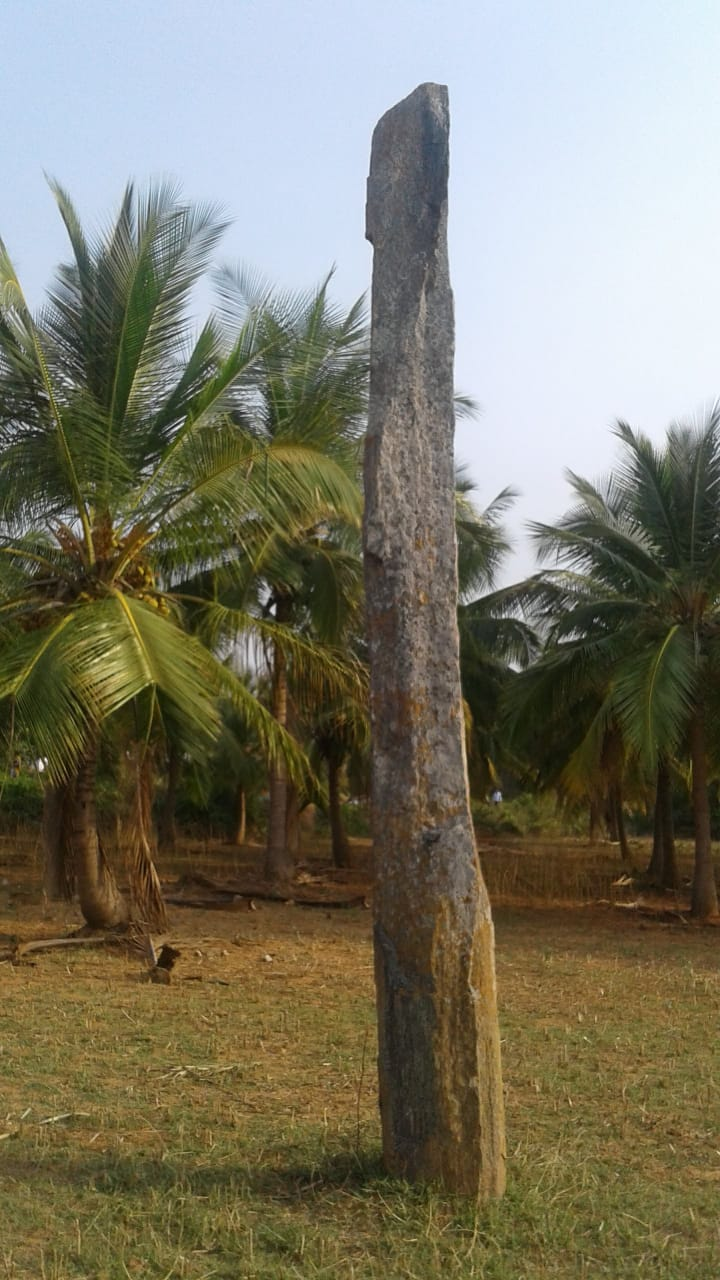
Stone pillar

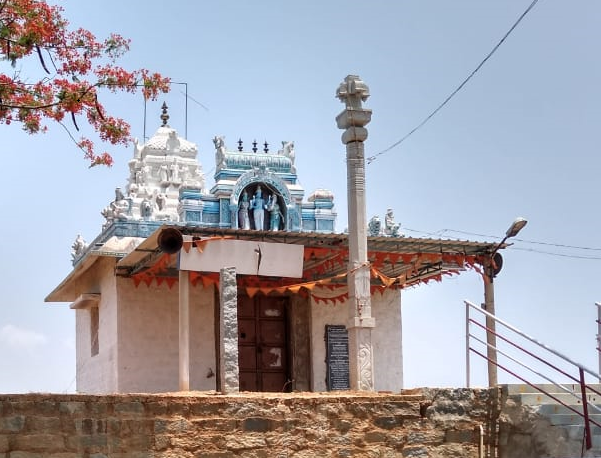
Bettada Timmappa Temple

The village has another temple of religious and historical importance, located on a hill top. It is known as Bettada Thimmappa temple. It is a Hosyala style temple built in the 16th century A.D. Restoration work was carried out in the early 2000s with donations collected from devotees organized by person from a nearby village, Hanchipura. The temple attracts devotees from nearby villages like Valagerepura, Hancipura, Chanadanahalli and M A Colony. The village has many small temples dedicated to various gods like Channigaraya, Maramma- the village goddess, Varadaraya swamy, Anjaneya, Ishwara, Doddamma, Chikkamma which enjoy good patronage.

There is a tomb like structure with a statue of Basavanna, small bull which the locals call Basavana Gudi. It is said to be a tomb of 2 maids of a Brahmin priest who lived in the village long time ago. The Brahmin daughters as said to have lost their chastity to some village youths. Unable to marry his daughters off, the angry priest condemned his daughters to tombs and cursed that the perpetrators and their future generations be ruined. This was said to be the root cause for the mass migration of villagers that have obedience to the local Goddesses to other places. Most of the lands are owned by residents of neighboring villages rather than the people of this village. Most of the residents of this village, barring three families, are said to have migrated from Mandya district as far back as 6-7 generation.

Benavara has two old stone shelters called "Mantaps"- built for the travelers and devotees. There is a stone pillar, about 25 feet in height, 5 to 6 feet in girth in the outskirts of the village towards north. It is said to be a pillar that was used to tie the elephant in ancient times. But recent studies carried out by Mysore University in Nov, 2011 have shown that this pillar was planted on the tomb of a village head man or a person of high social standing around 800 BC. This pillar indicates that Benavara village may have been an important place with a history of nearly 3000 years. Villagers celebrate all major Hindiu festivals in accordance to customs and traditions. Sankranti, Shivaratri, Ugadi, Mari habba, Muni, other family deities festivals, Mudipu of Lord Thirupathi Thimmappa, Ekadashi, Shravana, Gowri, Ganesha, Dasara, Pitrupaksha, Karthika are some festivals observed worth mentioning.
