= Tharamatipet =

- Village
- Country: India
- State: Telangana
- Established: 1950

Government
  - Type: Grama panchayat
  - Body: Sarpanch supreme and ward members

Area
  - Total: 16.18 km^{2} (6.25 sq mi)

Population (2011)
  - Total: 3,984
  - Density: 246.2/km^{2} (637.7/sq mi)

Languages
  - Official: Telugu
- Time zone: UTC+5:30 (IST)
- Telephone code: 501505
- Vehicle registration: TS 07 XX XXXX

Tharamatipet is a village in Ranga Reddy district in Telangana, India. It falls under Hayathnagar mandal. The nearest large town is Hyderabad; Taramathipet sits close to the Hyderabad Outer Ring Road.

Mula Mahesh Goud is the present sarpanch of Taramathipet, elected in 2019 after his five years as the mandal parishad territorial constituency member. The major communities in Taramathipet are Gouds, Scheduled Castes and Kurumas.

The famous temples are Matha Mahankali Temple, Lord Shiva Temple, Hanuman Temple and 100 years old Masjid.

The major political parties are Indian National Congress, TRS, TDP and BJP
