= Indian reservation system =

Indian reservation system may refer to:

- Indian reservation, land reserved for Native American tribes in the United States.
- Reservation in India, a form of affirmative action to reserve quotas in education, jobs and scholarships in India.
