= Bashla =

- Village
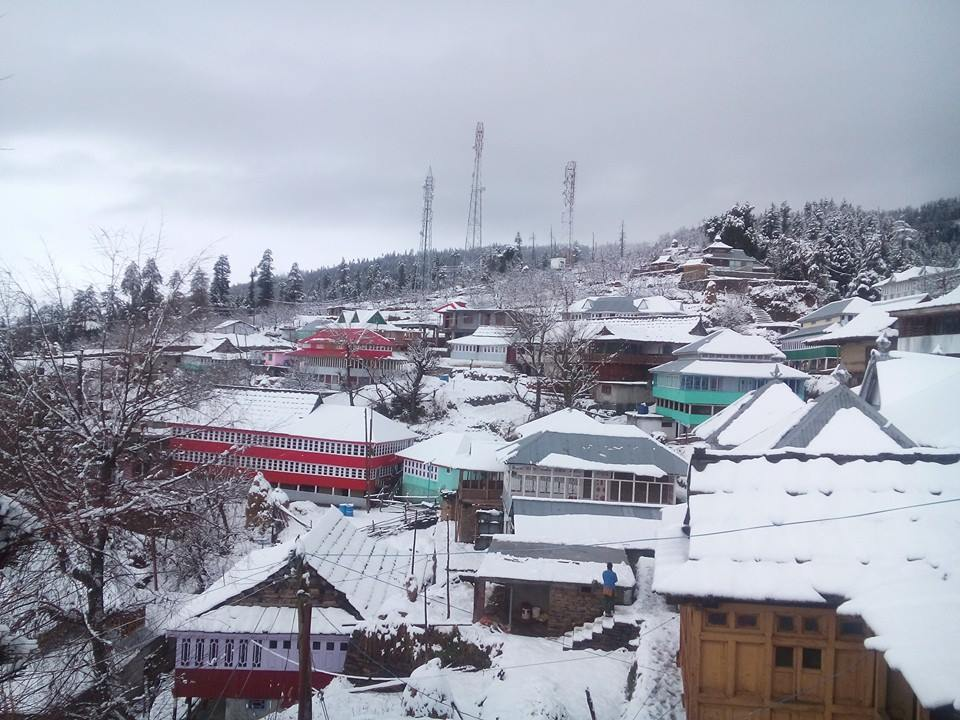

- Location in Himachal Pradesh, India Bashla (India)
- Coordinates: 31.2265°N 77.6994°E
- Country: India
- State: Himachal Pradesh
- District: Shimla

Area
  - Total: 2.24 km^{2} (0.86 sq mi)

Population (2011)
  - Total: 634
  - Density: 283/km^{2} (733/sq mi)

Languages
  - Official: Hindi
  - Regional: Mahasu Pahari (Kochi)
- Time zone: UTC+5:30 (IST)
- Vehicle registration: HP
- literacy rate: 70.66
- Sex ratio: 1.03

Bashla is a village in the Shimla district of Himachal Pradesh, India.

== Demographics ==
According to the 2011 Census of India, Bashla had a population of 634 and a total area of 2.24 km^{2}. Males and females constituted 50.79 per cent and 49.21 per cent respectively of the population. Literacy at that time was 70.66 per cent. People classified as Scheduled Castes under India's system of positive discrimination accounted for 39.75 per cent of the population.
