= Bihar Savarna Aayog =

Caste in India

- बिहार सवर्ण आयोग

Agency overview
- Formed: 31 January 2011
- Type: State commission
- Jurisdiction: Government of Bihar
- Agency executive: Mahachandra Singh, President

Footnotes
- State commission for Savarna Samaaj in Bihar

Bihar Savarna Aayog (Devanagari: बिहार सवर्ण आयोग) is a state commission dedicated to the economically and educationally backward upper castes people in Bihar. The main objective of the commission is to give suggestions to the government to integrate the economically and educationally backward upper castes in the mainstream of the society. The Commission was constituted on 31 January 2011. It is a five-member commission. The commission is headed by a president selected from the government. The present president of the commission is Mahachandra Singh. According to the president Mahachandra Singh, more than 50 percent of the upper caste people in Bihar are economically weak. Bihar is the first state in India having separate commission for the Savarna castes.

== Etymology ==
The Indic term Savarna refers to the class of the upper castes in the northern part of the Indian subcontinent. It is general category of the Indian constitution. Similarly the other Indic term Aayog refers to a state commission for official activity. Thus Bihar Savarna Aayog literally translates to a state commission looking official activity into the matter of Savarna class in the state of Bihar in India.

== Background ==
In the year 2010, the Bihar legislative assembly election was fought in the name of Savarna Arakshan (reservation for upper castes). The voices for Savarna Arakshan were raised by both the ruling and the opposition parties. During the election campaigns, it was initially raised by Lalu Prasad Yadav and then the chief minister Nitish Kumar too endorsed it and promised to establish a Savarna Aayog to benefits the weaker section of the Savarna castes people in the state.

== History ==
After the election, Nitish Kumar returned to power and decided to form the Savarna Aayog (Upper Caste Commission). On 27 January 2011, the cabinet of the Bihar Government approved the formation of the Savarna Aayog. Finally, on 31 January 2011, the commission for Savarna class was constituted.

The commission was formed with five members under the chairmanship of the retired judge D K Trivedi of the Allahabad High Court. Krishna Prasad Singh was appointed as the vice-chairman of the commission. Similarly, its other founding members were Narendra Prasad Singh, Farhat Abbas, and Sanjay Mayukh Prakash.

== Objectives ==
- To identify educationally and economically weaker groups among the upper castes in the state of Bihar.
- Identifying a segment of the upper castes that has limited sources of economic advantage, including land, compared to other segments, and assessing the decline in the importance of their ancestral occupations.
- To find out the reasons for their backwardness and to suggest solutions in their larger interest.
- The state government should set a criterion on economic basis to identify those people of upper caste who are living in adverse conditions.
