= Reservation policy in Tamil Nadu =

System of affirmative action in India

Reservation policy in Tamil Nadu is a system of affirmative action that provides historically disadvantaged groups representation in education and employment. Reservations in the state rose from 41 percent in 1954 to 69 percent in 1990.

== History ==
Tamil Nadu has long struggled for equal educational opportunities and government jobs dating back to the pre-independence period. Reservation was especially believed by the oppressed classes as a successful mechanism for affirmative action against discrimination.

=== Before independence ===
The Madras Presidency was the very first presidency in British Raj to use reservation as a means of ensuring justice for the disadvantaged. There were complaints about Brahmin dominance in the government, where they overshadowed others by numbers and held senior roles. The Brahmin hegemony in the administration was owing to their better educational opportunities as a result of their superior position in the caste hierarchy.

C. Natesa Mudaliar, P. Theagaraya Chetty and T.M. Nair established the South Indian Liberal Federation, popularly known as the Justice Party in 1916 to advocate for non-Brahmins in government workforce in the Madras Presidency. Chief Minister of Madras Presidency, Akaram Subbaroyalu Reddy, acted in 1921 with a Government Order setting up reservation. The Government Order was met with immediate opposition and had to be put on hold. The social reformer Periyar E. V. Ramasamy who was a member of the Congress at the time, pushed his party to endorse reservation. He resigned after the party declined, and rallied all over Tamil Nadu to gain support for the Government Order's implementation. The Government Order known as the 'Communal Government Order' was only implemented in 1927 by P. Subbaroyan, a Chief Minister of Madras Presidency. According to the Governmental order, Non-Brahmin Hindus were to receive 44% of all posts, while Brahmins, Muslims, Christians and Anglo-Indians were to receive 16% each, and Scheduled Castes were to receive 8%. Although, these numbers did not accurately represent their population share, Periyar pointed to it as a 'compromise' and accepted it. This order, which was based on English literacy, which was just about 7% at the time. The order remained in effect from then until 1950, and it was applied in employment and admissions to educational institutions.

=== After independence ===
In 1950, India's Constitution went into effect. The Communal governmental order was shortly annulled by the Madras High Court on the basis that it was unconstitutional. The decision was upheld by the Supreme Court. A Statewide protest against the court judgment was led by Periyar. The Congress also backed the reservations. Chief Minister K. Kamaraj brought the matter to Prime Minister Jawaharlal Nehru, who helped amend Articles 15 and 16 of the Constitution, which enable states to have quotas in educational institutions and public service for educationally and socially backward classes.

== Present Reservation Scheme Details ==
Below are the details of Reservation followed in Tamil Nadu.

Reservation in Tamil Nadu
1. Backward Class (BC) (30.0%)
2. Most Backward Communities (MBC)(13+7(MBC and DNC)) (20.0%)
3. Scheduled Castes (SC) (18.0%)
4. Scheduled Tribes (ST) (1.00%)
5. General (31.0%)

| Main Category as per Government of Tamil Nadu | Sub Category as per Government of Tamil Nadu | Reservation Percentage for each Sub Category as per Government of Tamil Nadu | Reservation Percentage for each Main Category as per Government of Tamil Nadu | Category as per Government of India |
|---|---|---|---|---|
| Backward Class (BC) | BC - General | 26.5% | 30% | Backward Class |
| Backward Class (BC) | BC - Muslims | 3.5% | 30% | Backward Class |
| Most Backward Class (MBC) | Most Backward Communities (MBC) | 13% | 20% | Backward Class |
| Most Backward Class (MBC) | Denotified Community (DNC) | 7% | 20% | Backward Class |
| Scheduled Castes | Scheduled Castes (others) | 15% | 18% | Scheduled castes and scheduled tribes |
| Scheduled Castes | only for (Arunthathiyar) | 3% | 18% | Scheduled castes and scheduled tribes |
| Scheduled Tribes | | 1% No Sub-Categories | 1% | Scheduled castes and scheduled tribes |
| Total Reservation Percentage | | | 69% | |

== Impact ==
Tamil Nadu's reservation policy is successful. Reservations have a major effect in Tamil Nadu's successful results on human development index.

== Timeline ==
Tamil Nadu Reservations

=== 1920 – 1979 ===
In 1927 due to the efforts of Periyar E. V. Ramasamy, the Communal government order was brought into effect by the Chief minister of the Madras Presidency. The reservation gave 44% to non-Brahmin Hindus, 8% to scheduled castes and 16% to Brahmins, Christians and Muslims. Although, these numbers did not accurately represent their population share, Periyar pointed to it as a 'compromise' and accepted it.

In 1950, the reservation was removed because it was considered unconstitutional by the Madras High court and was upheld by the Supreme court.

From 1951, the backward classes were given a 25% allocation.

In 1970, the first backward classes commission of Tamil Nadu, led by A.N. Sattanathan and assigned by M. Karunanidhi, alleged in its report that a higher class inside that backward class termed as the "Creamy layer" had been exploiting huge advantages of reservation and preventing the growth of the actual backward classes (BC). The Commission proposed that a separate group of "Most backward class" (MBC) be created, as well as an expansion in quotas to aid everyone. The Commission further proposed imposing certain economic requirements to exclude the Creamy layer from gaining all advantages of reservation. The Commission proposed a separate quota of 16% for the MBC and 17% for the BC. The overall reservation rate in Tamil Nadu was 41%.

In 1971, The Dravida Munnetra Kazhagam (DMK) government increased reservation for BC from 25% to 31% and the reservation for Scheduled Castes (SC) and Scheduled Tribes (ST) from 16% to 18%. Karunanidhi established a separate Ministry for the Welfare of the backward class during the DMK's rule from 1971 to 1976, the first such in the country. The state's total reservation stood at 49 percent.

The All India Anna Dravida Munnetra Kazhagam, headed by M.G. Ramachandran, decided to implement the creamy layer principle based on the recommendations of Sattanathan Commission in 1979. In 1979, Ramachandran set up an economic criteria of Rs. 9,000 annual income limit for reservation eligibility. There was strong political opposition against this policy.

=== 1980 – 1989 ===
In 1980, the AIADMK under M. G. Ramachandran reversed his decision of economic criteria after the AIADMK faced a close defeat in the 1980 Indian general election in Tamil Nadu. He further raised the quota for the Backward Classes from 31 percent to 50 percent making the total reservation to 68%. The forward castes filed a lawsuit with the Supreme Court opposing this move. The Supreme Court ordered the government to form a commission to investigate the real state of backward classes in Tamil Nadu.

In 1982, the Second Backward Classes Commission assigned by the MGR government and headed by J.A. Ambasankar found that about 11 castes, accounting for about 34.8 percent of the backward classes, represent 50.7 percent jobs in public service commission, 62.7 percent seats in professional courses, and 53.4 percent scholarships. The Commission determined that the backward class population was about 67 percent and requested that 17 forward caste groups be added to the list while 34 caste groups be removed. The government added 29 new caste groups to the list of backward classes but did not exclude any and kept the same 68 percent quota for SCs, and STs and backward classes.

In 1987, Vanniar Sangam, the Parent Body of Pattali Makkal Katchi, conducted statewide road blockades, vandalized public property, committed arson on Dalit settlements and fell trees seeking 20% reservations in state government and 2 percent reservations in the federal government for the Vanniyar Caste. 21 Vanniyars were killed in Police firing. MG Ramachandran convened a meeting with the community's leaders. He soon became ill and died without making a decision.

In 1989, after Vanniyar protests, the DMK government under split the 50 percent BC quota into a 30 percent for Other Backward Class (OBC) and 20 percent for MBC. The Vanniyars were qualified for reservation under the MBC quota, along with 106 other caste groups.

=== 1990 – present ===
In 1990, the DMK government under Karunanidhi then divided reservation for SC and ST based on the decision of the Madras High Court. The 1% quota for STs brought the total reservation rate in Tamil Nadu to 69 percent.

In 1992, the Supreme Court ruled in 1992 that the overall amount of reservations allowed should not exceed 50% as per Article 16(4). Following the Supreme Court's decision, the Madras High Court ordered the State to reduce it to 50% beginning in the academic year 1994–1995.

In 1993, the Tamil Nadu Backward Classes, Scheduled Castes, and Scheduled Tribes Bill, 1993 was passed by the Assembly (Act 45 of 1994). The Bill was sent to the President for his approval. J Jayalalithaa's AIADMK government led a cross-party committee of Tamil Nadu politicians to Delhi to meet with the Central government. She also demanded that the Tamil Nadu government's Act be placed in the Constitution's Ninth Schedule, ensuring that it cannot be contested in any court. The President's signature was received, confirming the 69 percent reservation for Tamil Nadu.

In 1994, an Advocate K. M. Vijayan was viciously assaulted and maimed on his way to New Delhi to file a complaint in the Supreme Court challenging the addition of 69 percent reservation in the 9th Schedule. Later the 69% Reservation was included in 9th Schedule on the same year.

== See also ==
- Reservation in India
- Ministry of Social Justice and Empowerment (India)
- Ministry of Minority Affairs
- Court Cases Relating to India's Reservation System
- Women's Reservation Bill
- Dhangar Scheduled tribe issue
- Socialism
- Caste politics in India
