= Other Backward Class =

Term for socially or educationally disadvantaged group of people in India

The Other Backward Class (OBC) is a collective term used by the Government of India to classify communities that are "educationally or socially backward" (i.e., deprived/disadvantaged). It is one of several official classifications of the population of India, along with general castes, Scheduled Castes and Scheduled Tribes (SCs and STs). The OBCs were found to comprise 52% of the country's population by the Mandal Commission report of 1980 and were determined to be 41% in 2006 when the National Sample Survey Organisation took place. There is substantial debate over the exact number of OBCs in India; it is generally estimated to be sizable, but many believe that it is higher than the figures quoted by either the Mandal Commission or the National Sample Survey.

In the Indian Constitution, OBCs are described as socially and educationally backward classes (SEBC), and the Government of India is enjoined to ensure their social and educational development — for example, the OBCs are entitled to 27% reservations in public sector employment and higher education. The list of OBCs maintained by the Indian Ministry of Social Justice and Empowerment is dynamic, with castes and communities being added or removed depending on social, educational, and economic factors. In a reply to a question in Lok Sabha, Union Minister Jitendra Singh informed that as of January 2016, the percentage of OBCs in central government services is 21.57% and has shown an increasing trend since September 1993. Likewise, in 2015, at educational institutions, funds meant for OBC students under the reservation policy were not used properly or were underused in cases of upgrading infrastructure as well as in violation of faculty recruitment of OBCs according to the 49% reservation policy.

Until 1985, the affairs of the Backward Classes were looked after by the Backward Classes Cell in the Ministry of Home Affairs. A separate Ministry of Welfare was established in 1985 (renamed in 1998 the Ministry of Social Justice and Empowerment) to attend to matters relating to Scheduled Castes, Scheduled Tribes and OBCs. The Backward Classes Division of the Ministry looks after the policy, planning, and implementation of programmes relating to social and economic empowerment of OBCs, and matters relating to two institutions set up for the welfare of OBCs, the National Backward Classes Finance and Development Corporation and the National Commission for Backward Classes.

== Government obligation ==
Under Article 340 of the Indian Constitution, the government must promote the welfare of the OBCs.

The president may by order appoint a commission consisting of such persons as he thinks fit to investigate the conditions of socially and educationally backward classes (SEBC) within the territory of India and the difficulties under which they labour and to make recommendations as to the steps that should be taken by the union or any state to remove such difficulties and as to improve their condition and as to the grants that should be made, and the order appointing such commission shall define the procedure to be followed by the commission. ... A commission so appointed shall investigate the matters referred to them and present to the president a report setting out the facts as found by them and making such recommendation as they think proper.

— Article 340 of the Indian Constitution

A 1992 decision of the Supreme Court of India resulted in a requirement that 27% of civil service positions be reserved for members of OBCs. In a reply to a question in Lok Sabha, Union Minister Jitendra Singh informed that as of January 2016, the percentage of OBCs in central government jobs is 21.57%.

== Socio-economic status ==
There existed a huge disparity among various castes and communities classified as Other Backward Class, even before the implementation of the reservation policy in government jobs and educational institutions, as per the recommendation of the Mandal Commission report. While a major section of Other Backward Castes was extremely backward, there existed a section that owned considerable land and employed Scheduled Castes (SC) as agricultural labourers. In the agitation for implementation of the report of Mandal Commission, Scheduled Castes supported the Other Backward Castes, but after the implementation of these recommendations on the direction of Supreme Court of India, the tension between a section of OBCs and SCs increased.

In some states of North India, the Yadavs, Kurmis, and the Koeris, which were called "upper-OBC", were well off, due to ownership of a sizeable amount of land. The abolition of Zamindari system in post-independence India raised many of the members of these communities to the status of landlords. Following the Green Revolution in India, their landholdings and economic prosperity increased further; they acquired education and became an active participant in government jobs. Further, after the Mandal agitation subsided in North India, OBC leaders gained political power to outnumber the upper caste legislators in most of the north Indian states. This led to the formation of the OBC-led government in many states of North India. They also ended up claiming the high ritual status, which is defined as Sanskritisation.

However, the OBC consolidation in some of the states of north India like Bihar, left many other OBC communities away from the development process. The political and economic prosperity was cornered by the dominant Backward Castes like Koeri, Kurmi and Yadav; this was witnessed in the formation of political blocs in the state after 1995, in which, either side was dominated by these three castes.

Within this section of OBCs called upper-OBC, there also exists disparity in educational attainment and political mobilisation. While the Yadavs were the biggest beneficiary in political achievements, their political progress didn't improve their position in the caste hierarchy and the spread of education among them also remained less as compared to more educationally advanced communities like Awadhia Kurmi, Koeri and Bania. Since the Yadavs were associated with cattle herding in contrast to other upper-OBCs, who were owner cultivators, trespassing into field of landlords and regular struggle with the latter was a challenge for their survival. The mobilisation of Other Backward Class for social-economic ascendancy was not observed at the same pace and in the same manner in different north Indian states. In north India, states like Rajasthan and Madhya Pradesh also have substantial populations of Backward Castes, yet, no movement as seen in states like Bihar took place in these states. Many observers have mentioned that in Bihar, the upper OBCs viz. Koeri, Kurmi, and Yadav's political ascendancy went hand in hand with land reforms and peasant movements, benefitting these three castes. These movements changed not only their political position but also their socio-economic profile. However, in the case of Madhya Pradesh, the national political parties like Bharatiya Janata Party and Indian National Congress accommodated the Backward Class in the political structure of the state in a way that socio-political movement of any kind was prevented from taking place.

== Demographics ==
=== Kalelkar Commission ===
Adjacent is the distribution of population of each religion by caste categories, obtained from merged sample of Schedule 1 and Schedule 10 of available data from the National Sample Survey Organisation 55th (1999–2000) and National Sample Survey Organisation 61st Rounds (2004–05) Round Survey.

The First Backward Classes Commission was established by a presidential order on 29 January 1953 under the chairmanship of Kaka Kalelkar and submitted its report on 30 March 1955. It had prepared a list of 2,399 backward castes or communities for the entire country, of which 837 had been classified as the "most backward". Some of the most notable recommendations of the Kalelkar Commission were:

1. Undertaking caste-wise enumeration of the population in the census of 1961;
2. Relating the social backwardness of a class to its low position in the traditional caste hierarchy of Indian society;
3. Treating all women as a class as "backward";
4. Reservation of 70 percent of seats in all technical and professional institutions for qualified students of backward classes.
5. Reservation of vacancies in all government services and local bodies for other backward classes.

The commission in its final report recommended "caste as the criteria" to determine backwardness. However, the report was not accepted by the government, which feared that the backward classes excluded from the castes and communities selected by the commission might not be considered, and those in most need would be swamped by the multitudes, thus receiving insufficient attention.

=== Mandal Commission ===
The decision to set up a second backward classes commission was made official by the president on 1 January 1979. The commission is popularly known as the Mandal Commission, its chairman being B. P. Mandal, submitted a report in December 1980 that stated that the population of OBCs, which includes both Hindus and non-Hindus, was around 52 percent of the total population. The commission prepared a list of 3,743 backward castes or communities for the entire country, of which 1,937 had been classified as the "depressed backward class". It developed 11 indicators or criteria to identify OBCs, of which four were economic.

Twenty-seven percent of reservations were recommended owing to the legal constraint that the total quantum of reservations should not exceed 50 percent. States that have already introduced reservations for OBC exceeding 27 percent will not be affected by this recommendation. With this general recommendation, the commission proposed the following overall scheme of reservation for OBC:

1. Candidates belonging to OBC recruited based on merit in an open competition should not be adjusted against their reservation quota of 27 percent.
2. The above reservation should also be made applicable to the promotion quota at all levels.
3. Reserved quota remaining unfilled should be carried forward for three years and de-reserved thereafter.
4. Relaxation in the upper age limit for direct recruitment should be extended to the candidates of OBC in the same manner as done in the case of scheduled castes and scheduled tribes.
5. A roster system for each category of posts should be adopted by the concerned authorities in the same manner as presently done in respect to scheduled caste and scheduled tribe candidates.

These recommendations in total apply to all recruitment to public sector undertakings, both under the central and state governments as well as to nationalised banks. All private sector undertakings that have received financial assistance from the government in one form or another should also be obliged to recruit personnel on the aforesaid basis. All universities and affiliated colleges should also be covered by the above scheme of reservation. Although education is considered an important factor in bringing a desired social change, "educational reform" was not within the terms of reference of this commission. To promote literacy the following measures were suggested:

1. An intensive time-bound programme for adult education should be launched in selected pockets with a high concentration of the OBC population.
2. Residential schools should be set up in these areas for backward-class students to provide a climate especially conducive to serious studies. All facilities in these schools including board and lodging should be provided free of cost to attract students from poor and backward class homes.
3. Separate hostels for OBC students with the above facilities will have to be provided.
4. Vocational training was considered imperative.
5. It was recommended that seats should be reserved for OBC students in all scientific, technical and professional institutions run by the central as well as state governments. The quantum of reservation should be the same as in the government services, i.e. 27 percent.

=== NSSO ===
NSSO estimated state wise Other Backward Classes demography
State and Union Territories	2011 Census population	Approximate OBC population	OBC percentage	No of Central OBC Communities (as of Agaust 2018)
Andaman and Nicobar Islands	380,581	69,000	18.1%	5
Andhra Pradesh (including Telangana)	84,580,777	42,629,000	50.4%	190
Arunachal Pradesh	1,383,727	39,000	2.8%	0
Assam	31,205,576	7,895,000	25.3%	28
Bihar	104,099,452	65,166,000	62.6%	132
Chandigarh	1,055,450	234,000	22.2%	60
Chhattisgarh	25,545,198	11,623,000	45.5%	67
Dadra and Nagar Haveli	343,709	15,000	4.4%	10
Daman and Diu	243,247	92,000	37.8%	44
Goa	1,458,545	261,000	17.9%	17
Gujarat	60,439,692	24,297,000	40.2%	105
Haryana	25,351,462	7,174,000	28.3%	73
Himachal Pradesh	6,864,602	1,174,000	17.1%	52
Jammu and Kashmir	12,541,302	1,430,000	11.4%	23
Jharkhand	32,988,134	15,438,000	46.8%	134
Karnataka	61,095,297	33,908,000	55.5%	199
Kerala	33,406,061	21,814,000	65.3%	83
Lakshadweep	64,473	450	0.7%	0
Madhya Pradesh	72,626,809	30,140,000	41.5%	68
Maharashtra	112,374,333	37,983,000	33.8%	256
Manipur	2,855,794	1,505,000	52.7%	4
Meghalaya	2,966,889	36,000	1.2%	0
Mizoram	1,097,206	18,000	1.6%	0
Nagaland	1,978,502	4,000	0.2%	0
NCT of Delhi	16,787,941	3,274,000	19.5%	56
Odisha	41,974,218	13,935,000	33.2%	197
Puducherry	1,247,953	962,000	77.1%	58
Punjab	27,743,338	4,467,000	16.1%	65
Rajasthan	68,548,437	32,423,000	47.3%	69
Sikkim	610,577	309,000	50.6%	8
Tamil Nadu	72,147,030	54,904,000	76.1%	182
Tripura	3,673,917	603,000	16.4%	42
Uttar Pradesh	199,812,341	108,898,000	54.5%	76
Uttarakhand	10,086,292	1,846,000	18.3%	78
West Bengal	91,276,115	7,941,000	8.7%	98
India	1,210,854,977	532,776,000	44%	2,479

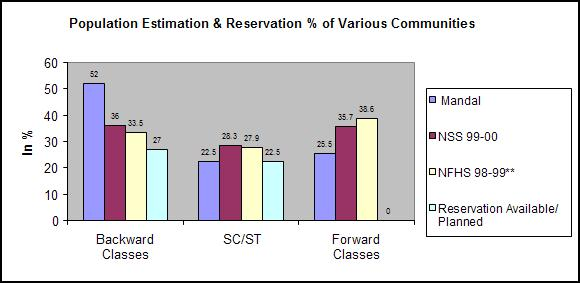
**NFHS Survey estimated only Hindu OBC population. Total OBC population derived by assuming Muslim ABCation in the same proportion as Hindu OBC population.

The National Sample Survey puts the figure at 41% while Mandal commission at 52%. There is substantial debate over the exact number of OBCs in India, with census data compromised by partisan politics. It is generally estimated to be sizable, but higher than the figures quoted by either the Mandal Commission or and National Sample Survey. However, as of 2006, the number of backward castes in Central list of OBCs has increased to 5,013 (without the figures for most of the Union Territories), per National Commission for Backward Classes from 2,399 and 1,743 communities identified the Kalelkar and Mandal commission respectively.

=== Sub-categorisation ===
In October 2017, the President of India Ram Nath Kovind notified a five-member Commission headed by Delhi High Court's former Chief Justice G. Rohini under Article 340 of Indian Constitution, to explore the idea of OBC sub-categorisation. The National Commission for Backward Classes had recommended it in 2011 and a standing committee too had repeated this. The committee has a three-point mandate:

1. To examine the "extent of inequitable distribution of benefits of reservation" among various castes and communities that come under the Central OBC list.
2. To work out the mechanism, criteria, and parameters for the actual sub-categorisation. The actual OBC reservation will continue to be 27% and within this, the committee will have to do the re-arranging.
3. Bringing order to the Central list of OBCs by removing any repetitions.

The committee will have to deliver the report within 12 weeks of its constitution. The lower OBCs form around 35% of the population in Uttar Pradesh. OBC sub-categorisation has already been implemented at state level by 11 states: West Bengal, Tamil Nadu, Maharashtra, Andhra Pradesh, Telangana, Karnataka, Jharkhand, Bihar, Jammu and Kashmir region and Haryana, and the union territory of Puducherry. The term of the commission has been extended to 31 May 2019. Its report stated that prime beneficiaries of 97% OBC reservation include Yadav, Kurmi, Jat (Jats of Rajasthan except those of Bharatpur and Dholpur district are in Central OBC list), Saini, Thevar, Ezhava and Vokkaliga castes. After 13 extensions to its tenure, Rohini Commission submitted its report to President Droupadi Murmu on 31 July 2023. The report is more than 1,000-pages long and is divided in two parts- the first part deals with how the OBC quota should be allocated; and the second part is an updated list of all 2,633 OBC castes across India.

== Legal disputes ==
=== Creamy layer and Indra Sawhney vs Union of India ===
The term creamy layer was first coined by Justice Krishna Iyer in 1975 in the State of Kerala vs NM Thomas case, wherein he observed that "the danger of 'reservation', it seems to me, is three-fold. Its benefits, by and large, are snatched away by the top creamy layer of the 'backward' caste or class, thus keeping the weakest among the weak always weak and leaving the fortunate layers to consume the whole cake". 1992 Indra Sawhney & Others v. Union of India judgment laid down the limits of the state's powers: it upheld the ceiling of 50 percent quotas, emphasized the concept of "social backwardness", and prescribed 11 indicators to ascertain backwardness. The nine-judge Bench judgement also established the concept of qualitative exclusion, such as the "creamy layer". The creamy layer is only applicable in the case of Other Backward Castes and not applicable on other groups like SC or ST. The creamy layer criteria were introduced at Rs 100,000 in 1993, and revised to Rs 250,000 in 2004, Rs 450,000 in 2008, and Rs 600,000 in 2013. In October 2015, National Commission for Backward Classes proposed that a person belonging to OBC with an annual family income of up to Rs 1.5 million should be considered as minimum ceiling for OBC. NCBC also recommended sub-division of OBCs into 'backward', 'more backward' and 'extremely backward' blocs and divide 27% quota amongst them in proportion to their population, to ensure that stronger OBCs don't corner the quota benefits. In August 2017, NDA government announced the creamy layer ceiling in the OBC category from getting reservation in jobs, has been raised from Rs 6 lakh a year to Rs 8 lakh.

=== Supreme Court interim stay ===
On 29 March 2007, the Supreme Court of India, as an interim measure, stayed the law providing for 27 percent reservation for Other Backward Classes in educational institutions like IITs and IIMs. This was done in response to a public interest litigation — Ashoka Kumar Thakur vs. Union of India. The Court held that the 1931 census could not be a determinative factor for identifying the OBCs to provide reservation. The court also observed, "Reservation cannot be permanent and appear to perpetuate backwardness".

=== Supreme Court verdict ===
On 10 April 2008, the Supreme Court of India upheld the government's initiative of 27% OBC quotas in government-funded institutions. The Court has categorically reiterated its prior stand that those considered part of the "Creamy layer" should be excluded by government-funded institutions and by private institutions from the scope of the reservation policy. The verdict produced mixed reactions from supporting and opposing quarters.

Several criteria to identify the portion of the population comprising the "creamy layer" have been recommended, including the following:

- Children of those with family income above ₹250,000 a year, and then ₹450,000 a year as of October 2008 and now ₹800,000 a year, should be considered creamy layer, and excluded from the reservation quota.
- Children of doctors, engineers, chartered accountants, actors, consultants, media professionals, writers, bureaucrats, defence officers of colonel and equivalent rank or higher, high court and Supreme Court judges, and all central and state government Class A and B officials should be excluded.
- The Court has requested Parliament to exclude the children of MPs and MLAs as well.

=== Supreme Court conclusions from Ashoka Kumar Thakur vs. Union of India ===
1. The Constitution (Ninety-Third Amendment) Act, 2006 does not violate the "basic structure" of the Constitution so far as it relates to the state-maintained institutions and aided educational institutions. The question of whether the Constitution (Ninety-Third Amendment) Act, 2006 would be constitutionally valid or not so far as "private unaided" educational institutions are concerned, is left open to be decided in an appropriate case.
2. The "creamy layer" principle is one of the parameters to identify backward classes. Therefore, principally, the "creamy layer" principle cannot be applied to STs and SCs, as SCs and STs are separate classes by themselves.
3. Preferably there should be a review after ten years to take note of the change of circumstances.
4. A graduation (not technical graduation) or professional course deemed to be educationally forward.
5. Principle of exclusion of creamy layer applicable to OBC's.
6. The Central Government shall examine the desirability of fixing cut-off marks in respect of the candidates belonging to the Other Backward Classes (OBCs) to balance reservation with other societal interests and to maintain standards of excellence. This would ensure quality and merit would not suffer. If any seats remain vacant after adopting such norms they shall be filled up by candidates from general categories.
7. So far as the determination of backward classes is concerned, a notification should be issued by the Union of India. This can be done only after the exclusion of the creamy layer for which necessary data must be obtained by the Central Government from the State Governments and Union Territories. Such Notification is open to challenge on the grounds of wrongful exclusion or inclusion. Norms must be fixed keeping in view the peculiar features in different States and Union Territories. There has to be proper identification of Other Backward Classes (OBCs). For identifying backward classes, the Commission set up under the directions of this Court in Indra Sawhney 1 has to work more effectively and not merely decide applications for inclusion or exclusion of castes.
8. The Parliament should fix a deadline by which time free and compulsory education will have reached every child. This must be done within six months, as the right to free and compulsory education is perhaps the most important of all the fundamental rights (Art.21 A). Without education, it becomes extremely difficult to exercise other fundamental rights.
9. If material is shown to the Central Government that the Institution deserves to be included in the Schedule (institutes which are excluded from reservations) of The Central Educational Institutions (Reservation in Admission) Act, 2006 (No. 5 of 2007), the Central Government must take an appropriate decision based on materials placed and on examining the concerned issues as to whether Institution deserves to be included in the Schedule of the said act as provided in Sec 4 of the said act.
10. Held that the determination of SEBCs is done not solely based on caste and hence, the identification of SEBCs does not violate Article 15(1) of the Constitution.

=== Supreme Court scrapped Jat Reservations in Central OBCs list ===
In March 2015, Supreme Court of India scrapped Jat Reservations saying that Jats are not socially and economically backward in reference with National Commission for Backward Classes' (NCBC) opinion. Supreme Court judgement quashed the proposed inclusion of Jats in Central list of OBCs on the basis that Jats are already given OBC status in 9 States. On 21 July 2015, Supreme Court rejected Centre's review plea for its verdict of quashing Jat reservation in OBCs.

== Central List of OBCs ==
Lists of OBCs are maintained by both the National Commission for Backward Classes and the individual states. The central list does not always reflect the state lists, which can differ significantly. A community identified as a nationally recognized OBC in the NCBC central list may be so recognized only in specific states or only in limited areas within specific states. Occasionally, it is not an entire community that is thus classified but rather some parts within it. As of 2023, Maharashtra has the highest number of OBC castes listed under the Central List of OBCs, followed by Odisha, Karnataka and Tamil Nadu.

Distribution of state-wise caste in Central OBC list
State/UT	Number of castes in Central OBC list
Maharashtra	261
Odisha	200
Karnataka	199
Tamil Nadu	181
Bihar	136
West Bengal	98
Uttar Pradesh	76
All India	2633

=== Christians ===
The Karnataka State Government has issued notification granting OBC reservation benefits to Brahmin Christians, Kuruba Christians, Madiga Christians, Akkasali Christians, Sudri Christians, Scheduled Caste converts to Christianity, Setty Balija Christians, Nekara Christians, Paravar Christians and Lambani Christians.

The Kerala government grants OBC reservation benefits to Nadar Christians included in the South India United Church (SIUC), Anglo-Indians and the Latin Catholic community of Kerala.

The Government of Maharashtra grants OBC reservation benefits to East Indian Catholics.

=== Politically important social groups listed as OBC ===
- Kolis in the central list as well as in the state lists of Goa, Gujarat, Daman and Diu, Dadra and Nagar Haveli, Karnataka, Maharashtra,
- Rajputs only in Karnataka and Maharashtra (listed in NT-B).
- Vanjari community in Maharashtra
- Lodhis in states of Assam, Chhattisgarh, Gujarat, Haryana, Madhya Pradesh, Rajasthan, Uttar Pradesh and Telangana only and except these states they are notified as Forward Caste.
- Bishnoi/Vishnoi only in OBC list of Rajasthan.
- Goldsmith or Sunar/Soni/Sunar/Swarankar in Central as well as the State OBC list in Rajasthan.
- Khatris in the National as well as State OBC list of Tamil Nadu.
- Aras (Urs) community of the Mysore Wodeyars in Karnataka.
- Kathis in the central list of Gujarat.
- Ezhavas in the state list of Kerala
- Ahoms in the central list.
- Jats in the state lists of Rajasthan, Himachal Pradesh, Delhi, Uttarakhand, Uttar Pradesh, Madhya Pradesh, Punjab, and Chhattisgarh. However, only the Jats of Rajasthan – excluding those of Bharatpur district and Dholpur district – are entitled to the reservation of central government jobs given to OBCs.
- Ahirs/Yadavs in many states i.e. Uttar Pradesh, Madhya Pradesh, Chhattisgarh, Delhi, Haryana, Rajasthan, Gujarat, Maharashtra, Bihar, Jharkhand except Punjab.
- Gurjars in almost all states including Uttar Pradesh, Madhya Pradesh, Rajasthan, Gujarat, Maharashtra, Punjab, Uttarakhand, Haryana expect Himachal Pradesh and Jammu and Kashmir where they fall under the Scheduled Tribes (ST) category under the Indian government's reservation program of positive discrimination.
- Telis in the OBC list of Central government.
- Baris are listed as OBC in Madhya Pradesh, Rajasthan. Maharashtra, Uttar Pradesh, Bihar, Jharkhand, and Chhattisgarh.
- Kurmis in almost all the Indian states.
- Mallahs in almost all the states of India.
- Jogis in most of India's States and UTs, namely Assam, Rajasthan, Delhi, Uttarakhand, Uttar Pradesh, West Bengal, Madhya Pradesh and as Scheduled Caste in Himachal Pradesh.
- Nais in most of the state in India. These include Andhra Pradesh, Assam, Bihar, Chandigarh, Chhattisgarh, Dadra and Nagar Haveli, Daman and Diu, Delhi NCR, Goa, Gujarat, Haryana, Himachal Pradesh, Goa, Jharkhand,Karnataka, Madhya Pradesh,Maharashtra, Odisha, Puducherry,Punjab, Rajasthan, Tripura, Uttarakhand, Uttar Pradesh, and West Bengal
- Kulalas in almost all the states and in the OBC list of the central government.
- Velars in almost all the Indian states.

=== Listed Brahmins and other priestly communities ===
- Rajapur Saraswat Brahmins in the states of Maharashtra, Kerala and Karnataka.
- Bhargava Dakaut or Joshi Brahmins in the states of Rajasthan, Madhya Pradesh, Haryana, Punjab, and Delhi
- Kattaha Brahmin in the state of Rajasthan.
- Saurashtra Brahmins in the states of Tamil Nadu and Kerala.
- Goswami, Nath, Jogi, Yogi, Giri Brahmin in some states (Assam, Himachal Pradesh, Jammu and Kashmir, Haryana, Punjab, Bihar central list in notified general categories) Uttar Pradesh, Uttarakhand Jharkhand, Rajasthan, Gujarat in OBC.
- Dhiman and Jangid Brahmins in the states of Chandigarh, Delhi, Haryana, Himachal Pradesh, Punjab, Uttar Pradesh, Uttarakhand.
- Bairagi in the states of Chandigarh, Chhattisgarh, Delhi, Haryana, Himachal Pradesh, Jharkhand, Madhya Pradesh, Odisha, Punjab, Uttar Pradesh, Uttarakhand.
- Gurav or Shaiva Brahmins in the state of Maharashtra.

== Caste surveys held in Indian states ==
1. Socio-Economic Survey of Kerala 1968: In 1968, the Communist government under E. M. S. Namboodiripad ordered a socio-economic survey of each resident in the state of Kerala, to assess caste inequalities. Until the census of 2011, this survey was the only caste-based count conducted in post-independence India. The survey was not very conclusive, since it merged several unrelated castes into one group (for example, Ambalavasis and Tamil Brahmins were grouped along with Malayali Brahmins). The survey found that individuals belonging to higher castes possessed more land and had relatively higher per capita income as compared to the general population. The survey found that 33% of the state's population was forward caste, almost half of whom were Syrian Christians. According to the survey, 13% of the Brahmins, 6.8% of the Syro-Malabar Catholics, 5.4% of the Jacobites and 4.7% of the Nairs owned more than 5 acres of land. This compared with 1.4% of the Ezhavas, 1.9% of the Muslims, and 0.1% of the Scheduled Castes who had that much land in their possession.
2. Telangana's Samagra Kutumba Survey 2014 [published 2022]: The report reveals that Telangana's population of around 36.9 million is distributed among various caste groups. Scheduled Castes (SCs) and Scheduled Tribes (STs) represent approximately 18.48% and 11.74% of the population, respectively. Most of the population belongs to Backward Castes (BCs), making up 51% of the population, although the findings were never made public due to various court cases against it. Other castes comprise 16.03%, while religious minorities account for 10.65% of the population.
3. Karnataka Caste Census 2015 [status unknown]: The Social and Educational Survey ordered by then Chief Minister Siddaramaiah in 2014 to inform Other Backward Classes (OBC) reservations in Karnataka is yet to be published as of 2023. Initiated by the Karnataka State Commission for Backward Classes, the survey involved 1.6 lakh government employees canvassing around 1.3 crore households, costing the state Rs 169 crore. However, the report remains unpublished despite eight years passing, multiple government tenures, and repeated calls for its release from various political leaders. Controversy surrounds the issue with successive social welfare ministers, including H Anjaneya and Kota Shrinivas Poojary, blaming delays on incomplete tabulation and non-submission by the state BC Commission headed by MP Jayaprakash Hegde. Some sources suggest political pressure and potential upheaval in the state's power dynamics, particularly concerning the traditionally dominant Lingayat and Vokkaliga communities, as reasons for the report's non-disclosure. In June 2023, Siddaramaiah-led Congress government in Karnataka has decided to accept the 2015 socio-economic caste survey report, potentially stirring controversy as it reveals that the population of Vokkaligas and Lingayats is lower than commonly believed, with Dalits being the largest demographic group.
4. Uttarakhand OBC Survey [ongoing]: The ongoing Other Backward Classes (OBC) survey in Uttarakhand has experienced significant delays and issues with accuracy, leading to intervention by the single-member dedicated commission. Various districts have reported non-compliance with survey guidelines, including instances of reliance on outdated data rather than conducting new door-to-door surveys, as seen in Khatima. In response, the commission has cancelled the flawed survey, ordering a redo within 15 days, and transferred the officer in charge. Similar corrective measures have been taken in Champawat and Dharchula. Despite these efforts, the commission has yet to receive any completed data, not even from Dehradun, and the survey's conclusion has been extended to June 2023.
5. Bihar caste-based survey 2022:2022 Bihar caste-based survey first report was released on 2 October 2023. The report showed that extremely backward classes (EBCs) account for 36.01 percent of the 13.07 crore population of the state. OBCs, EBCs together account for 63% of the total population of Bihar. On 9 November 2023, Bihar Assembly Passed Bill For 65% Caste Quota excluding 10% EWS Quota, in government jobs and educational institutions. The new reservation quota percentages include 20% for Scheduled Castes, 2% for Scheduled Tribes, 18% for Backward Classes, 25% for Extremely Backward Classes, and 10% for the economically weaker section among the Upper Castes.
6. Odisha Backward Classes Survey 2023 [ongoing]: On 1 May 2023, the Odisha government initiated a comprehensive survey targeting state notified 211 Socially and Educationally Backward Classes (SEBC), which is expected to conclude by 29 June 2023. Administered across all 314 blocks and 114 urban local bodies of Odisha, the survey is being conducted by the Odisha State Commission for Backward Classes (OSCBC) using both online and offline methods. The survey aims to evaluate social and educational conditions of backwardness, factoring in various indicators such as occupation and educational qualifications. Initially, centers for data submission were established in Anganwadi Kendras and various PDS outlets, but later in the special survey drive the door-to-door data collection method was also adopted. The compiled data is expected to be published after five months of survey completion. It's noteworthy that the survey is being conducted under the OSCBC Act, 1993 and the OSCBC (Amendment) Act, 2020, allowing family heads or senior individuals to provide family data, including ration card, Aadhar card, or voter identity details.
7. UP Backward Classes Commission OBC quota report for ULB[ongoing]: The final report determining quotas for backward classes in urban local body polls is expected to be available by June 2023. The Backward Classes Commission, established on 28 December, plans to submit a preliminary report within three months. The commission aims to collect empirical data on backward classes, following Supreme Court and high court guidelines for OBC reservation in civic body elections. The commission's work involves data collection from district officials, studying processes in other states, and addressing objections from political parties.
8. Haryana Backward Classes Commission Chairman Report

== See also ==
- 2027 census of India
- Caste system in India
- Economically Weaker Section
- Bihar caste-based survey 2023
- Forward Castes
- Jat reservation agitation
- List of Muslim Other Backward Classes communities in India
- List of Scheduled Castes
- List of Scheduled Tribes in India
- Patidar reservation agitation
- Socio Economic and Caste Census 2011
- Upper Backward Castes
- Varna (Hinduism)
