= Kattaha Brahmin =

Hindu caste in India

The Kattaha Brahmins (also known as Maha Brahmins or Mahapatra ), are a Hindu caste found in the state of Uttar Pradesh, Punjab, Haryana, Rajasthan, Uttarakhand, Madhya Pradesh and Bihar in India. They are basically a priestly community who primarily perform death rites and are the traditional funeral priests of North India.

== Social organization ==
The Kattaha are the traditional funeral priests of North India. They are also known as Acharya. They are said to derive their name from the Hindi word pind-kattana, which means to cut the flour balls, an important ritual in Hindu funerals. Little is known about the origin of this community, and their status as Brahmin is barely recognized by other Brahmin groupings. The Kuthaliya Bora are a strictly endogamous community, and practice clan exogamy. Their three main clans or gotras are the Kashyap, Bharadwaj and Sandilya. They live in multi-caste villages, but occupy their own quarters and hamlets.

== Present circumstances ==
The Kattaha are found throughout Uttar Pradesh, with special concentrations in the districts of Sitapur, Hardoi, and Unnao in Awadh, and the districts of Shahjahanpur and Bareilly in Rohilkhand, and in Cuttack district and Khordha district in the state of Odisha. They speak various dialects of Hindi, such as Awadhi. And Odia in Odisha.
