= Forward caste =

Indian government term for non-disadvantaged castes

Forward caste (or General caste) is a term used in India to denote castes which are not listed in SC, ST or OBC reservation lists. They are on average considered ahead of other castes economically and educationally. They account for about 30.8% of the population based on Schedule 10 of available data from the National Sample Survey Organisation 55th (1999–2000) and National Sample Survey Organisation 61st Rounds (2004–05) Round Survey.

Those groups that qualify for reservation benefits are listed as Scheduled Castes and Scheduled Tribes, Other Backward Class and Economically Weaker Section. They can avail defined quotas amongst other benefits for education, special government schemes, government employment and political representation. The lists of Scheduled Castes, and Scheduled Tribes and Other Backward Class are compiled irrespective of religion.

Economically Weaker Section among forward castes were later granted less than 10% reservation by government.

== Economic and educational status ==
As of 2007, forward castes had to compete only in the open category, as they are considered socially, educationally, and economically advanced. The open category seats can be competed and filled by any section of the society irrespective of the caste. Due to rigorous demand and the relative financial weakness of the people of the General category, the Government of India introduced 10% as EWS quota for them, which makes their total reservation to 10%. However, in certain states, such as Tamil Nadu, the reservation percentage is around 69%.

== Reservation for economically backward among forward castes ==
Before 2019, forward castes were only allowed to compete for seats in the unreserved category in educational institutions and central government jobs, regardless of their educational/economical status in society. A significant percentage of the forward caste lives below the poverty line, and more than 30% of the members of this community are illiterate. To meet their aspirations, demands have been raised for providing separate reservations for the poor among forward caste populations. Many political parties like BJP, Samajwadi Party, LJP, Rastriya Janata Dal, Communist Party of India (Marxist), Bahujan Samaj Party have supported proposals for providing a separate reservation for the poor among the forward castes.

=== Timeline ===
- 1991: Congress government headed by Narasimha Rao introduced 10% separate reservation for poor among forward castes.
- 1992: The Supreme Court has ruled in the Indra Sawhney & Others v. Union of India case that separate reservation for poor among forward castes is invalid. Government has withdrawn separate reservation as per supreme court judgement.
- 2003: BJP government appointed a group of ministers for suggesting measures for implementation of separate reservation for the poor among forward castes.
- 2004: A task force has been set up to determine modalities for providing reservations to the poor among forward castes. No information available regarding a report submitted by this task force.
- 2006: Congress government appointed commission to study separate reservation for economically backward class.
- 2006: The Communist government in Kerala earmarked 12% of the seats in private professional colleges for the economically poor among forward castes.

State and central governments have not released adequate data regarding the representation of various communities in their services and admissions to educational institutions. Most of the private companies in India do not collect data regarding the community of their employees.

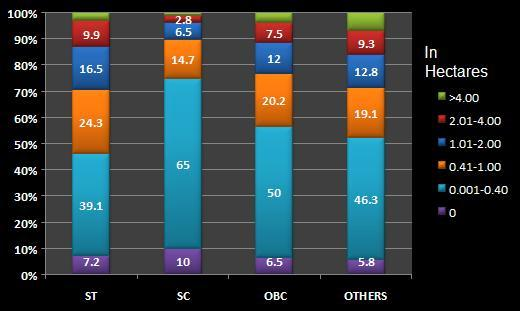
Rural landholding pattern of various social groups calculated by National Sample Survey 99-00 indicate that OBC and forward castes are comparable in wealth

- In Tamil Nadu forward castes have secured around 1.9% of the seats in medical colleges in 2004 and 2.68% of the seats in 2005, against their population percentage of 13%. This trend of poor representation has continued for the last 10 years as claimed by lawyers in one of the reservation cases, because other communities are very competitive and secure seats in general quote because of education has reached beyond forward communities.
- The Narendra committee report in Kerala has pointed out that forward castes representation in public services and PSU units is around 36 to 38%, which is more or less equal to their population percentage.
- The Karnataka minister in the state Assembly has announced that the per capita income of the Brahmins is less than that of all communities including scheduled castes and scheduled tribes.
- The oversight committee in its final report has indicated that forward castes are placed better than backward castes in some indicators and are comparable with backward castes concerning some few indicators and that backward castes are superior in some parameters like health indicators in states like Assam, Maharashtra, Haryana, West Bengal, etc.
- The national survey 99-00 indicates that forward castes are better placed than SC/ST in almost all parameters. In rural unemployment, forward castes score worse than all other communities.
- The provisional report of the National Sample Survey Organisation (2004–05) states that buying capacities of backward castes in rural and urban areas are comparable to forward castes. It also revises the backward castes figure as 41%. It states that landownership of backward castes are comparable to forward castes. It reiterates its earlier finding (in 99-00 survey) that forward castes are poorly employed (more unemployment).
- The national surveys used rural landholding pattern to assess wealthiness of various social groups. Its findings indicate that OBC and FC are comparable and there is a very small difference between them. There is a big difference between OBC/FC and SC. Even Scheduled Tribes are placed better than Scheduled castes. Experts who analysed the national survey results point out that other backward castes are near average in many parameters. Please see the chart.
- On 7 January 2019, the Union Council of Ministers approved a 10% reservation in government jobs and educational institutions for the Economically Weaker Section (EWS) in the forward castes. The cabinet decided that this would be over and above the existing 50% reservation for SC/ST/OBC categories.
- On 7 November 2022, Supreme Court of India by a 3:2 verdict in the Janhit Abhiyan vs Union Of India Writ Petition (Civil) No(S). 55 OF 2019, upheld the validity of the 103rd constitutional amendment carried out to provide legal sanction to carve out a 10% reservation for the economically weaker sections from unreserved classes for admission in educational institutions and government jobs and held that the 50% cap on quota is not inviolable and affirmative action on economic basis may go a long way in eradicating caste-based reservation. This constitutional amendment pushed the total reservation to 59.50% in central institutions.

== Shrinking educational opportunities ==
During April 2006, India's Human Resource Minister announced that 27% seats will be reserved exclusively for candidates from Other Backward class in addition to existing 22.5% reservation for Scheduled castes and Scheduled Tribes.

Many states do not have 27% of Other Backward class population, as per national sample surveys. (This includes major Indian states like Jammu and Kashmir, Himachal Pradesh, Goa, Maharashtra, Punjab, West Bengal). Some Indian states like Assam, Goa, Haryana, Himachal Pradesh, Uttarakhand, have more than 50% Forward castes population, which means the number of seats secured by Forward castes will not be equal to their population proportion even if they secure 100% seats in open competition in central government institutions of these states. Central government, however, excluded 27% reservations to Other Backward class to the areas with high tribal populations.

However, on 7 January 2019, the Union Council of Ministers approved 10% reservation for the forward castes in government jobs and educational institutions. This group is classified as the Economically Weaker Section (EWS). The cabinet decided that this would be over and above the existing 50% reservation for SC/ST/OBC categories.

== See also ==
- List of Other Backward Classes
- Socio Economic Caste Census 2011
