= P. A. Inamdar =

Indian educationalist

P.A.Inamdar
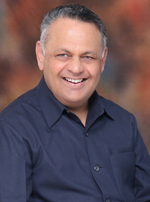
- President of M.C.E. Society, Pune
- Born: 28 December 1945 (age 80)
- Website: http://www.painamdar.in

P. A. Inamdar is an Indian educationist.

== Early life and education ==
Inamdar was born on 28 December 1945. He completed his BA (Honors) in Arts from Shivaji University, Kolhapur. P.A Inamdar was appointed by Government of India on the Planning Commission's working group on higher education for the twelfth five-year plan period 2012–2017. He worked to improve education of minorities in India.

== Present positions ==
- Member, National Council for Promotion of Urdu Language, GOI, New Delhi
- Member, Management Council, Hamdard University, New Delhi, A Govt. of India Trust
- Member, Management Council, Aligarh Muslim University
- Member, Managing Committee, Ce-Cap Education Trust
- Member court (Senate) Jamia Milia Islamia Central University New Delhi
- Ex.Member, Pharmacy Council of India
- Member, Planning Commission of India on Higher Education New
- Director, College of Visual Effects, Design and Art, Pune Delhi

== Founder ==
- INAMDAR MULTISPECIALITY HOSPITAL: A multi-speciality hospital that is centrally located in Pune
- DR. P. A. INAMDAR UNIVERSITY, PUNE
- ABEDA INAMDAR SENIOR COLLEGE, PUNE

== Cases ==
Inamdar has been involved in a number of cases.

- P. A. Inamdar and others Vs State of Maharashtra pune and others
- The Inamdar Judgement: Text of the Supreme Court judgement delivered on 12 August 2005 abolishing state quotas in private unaided professional colleges.
- Supreme Court on Mohammad Salim's right to grow beard
- Illegal Floors in Inamdar hospital
- Drowning of students of Inamdar College Pune
- Jail for assault
- Suit brought by directors alleging siphoning of money from the Muslim Co-Op Bank
