= Akkasaliga =

The Akkasaliga are a community from Karnataka, in southwestern India. Akkasaliga in the Kannada language means "the one who works gold", reflecting their traditional role as village goldsmiths. The community has preserved the craft of working with gold and silver across generations since ancient times.

In most larger villages, an Akkasaliga family lived alongside other groups who specialised in particular trades. Their skills were traditionally passed down within families.

With the rise of machine-based jewellery production, many Akkasaligas have moved away from their traditional profession and pursued modern education.
