= Goud =

Indian caste

- Classification: Other Backward Caste (OBC)
- Religions: Hinduism
- Languages: Telugu
- Country: India
- Populated states: Telangana; Andhra Pradesh

Goud is a caste, predominantly settled in the Indian states of Telangana and Andhra Pradesh. The Gouds have been traditionally involved in the occupation of toddy tapping. They are a rapidly developing community in both economical and political realms in Telangana.
