= Economically Weaker Section =

Economical class in India

Economically Weaker Section (EWS) in India is a subcategory of people having an annual family income less than ₹8 lakh (US$8,300) and who do not belong to any category such as SC/ST/OBC(Central list) across India, nor to MBC in Tamil Nadu. A candidate who does not fall under SC/ST/OBC and fulfils the EWS economic criteria is to be part of the EWS category. However, OBCs described in the State list but not in the Central list are also eligible for the EWS.

== History ==
On 7 January 2019, Union Council of Ministers approved a 10% reservation in government jobs and educational institutions for the Economically Weaker Section (EWS) in the unreserved (general) category The cabinet decided that this would be over and above the existing 50% reservation for SC/ST/OBC categories.

On 8 January 2019, The Constitution (One Hundred and Third amendment) Bill, 2019 was tabled in the Lok Sabha, the lower house of the Parliament of India and it was passed on the same day. The bill was passed by the upper house Rajya Sabha on 9 January. President Ram Nath Kovind gave assent to the bill on 12 January 2019, and a gazette was released on the bill, which turned it into law. Coming into force on 14 January 2019, the One Hundred and Third Amendment of the Constitution of India amended articles 15(6) and 16(6) of the Constitution of India to permit 10% reservations to the EWS category. A number of state cabinets approved the law and announced their intention to implement the 10% EWS reservations.

On 10 January 2019, Youth For Equality, an NGO that opposes caste-based policies, challenged the proposed amendment at the Supreme Court of India on grounds that it breaches the 50% reservations ceiling set by the same court; the group said it fully supports EWS reservations but wants this to be done by converting the existing 27% OBC quota into an economic means-tested non-caste-based quota instead, thus staying within the 50% cap set by the apex court. Conversely, leaders of Backward Classes welfare groups also approached the Supreme Court, opposing reservations for EWS groups altogether, arguing that EWS groups did not meet the reservations criteria that the same court had specified in an earlier case.

On 25 January 2019, the Supreme Court refused to stay the 10% reservation given to GEN-EWS category in government jobs and educational institutions. On 6 August 2020, the court decided that a 5-member bench would hear the case.

On 7 November 2022, Supreme Court of India by a 3:2 verdict in Janhit Abhiyan vs Union Of India Writ Petition (Civil) No(S). 55 OF 2019, upheld the validity of the 103rd constitutional amendment carried out to provide legal sanction carve out 10% reservation for the economically weaker sections from unreserved classes for admission in educational institutions and government jobs and held that the 50% cap on quota is not inviolable and affirmative action on economic basis may go a long way in eradicating caste-based reservation. This constitutional amendment pushed the total reservation to 59.50% in central institutions.

== Provision ==
Reservations granted by the Union Government for government educational institutions and jobs
1. Unreserved (40.5%)
2. Economically Weaker Section (10.0%)
3. Other Backward Class (27.0%)
4. Scheduled Castes (15.0%)
5. Scheduled Tribes (7.50%)

The Union Government of India tabled the Constitution (One Hundred third, 103rd CAA) Bill, 2019, by amending articles 15(6) and 16(6) of the constitution which provided 10% additional quota for the EWS students amongst the erstwhile Unreserved category or General category students.

The terms Economically Weaker Section (EWS) and Economically Backward Class (EBC) are not meant to be confused with each other in India. The definition of EWS has been defined by the Government of India, whereas the definition of EBC and Most Economically Backward Class (MEBC) vary in different states as well as institutions.

The eligibility to get the EWS certificate is not only purely based on annual family income but also based on the held property. The income limit has been set by the central government for admission to central government-owned colleges and jobs offered by the central government. State governments are given the authority to change the eligibility criteria and also to extend the income limit further for candidates seeking reservation under the EWS category, which will be valid only in state-owned colleges and state government's jobs as deemed fit for the respective states.

People belonging to the Economically Weaker Section since 1 February 2019 now get 10% reservation in education and government jobs of India (vertical reservations) similar to OBC, SC, ST.

People belonging to the OBC category that are listed under the State list but not in the Central list are also eligible for the EWS.

This reservation weakened the pace of many reservation agitations such as the Jat reservation moment, Patidar reservation movement, and Kapu reservation movement. Aspirants from the EWS category are not fully satisfied with this reservation because it does not include many benefits like age relaxation, fee relaxation, post-metric scholarship and house criteria from the very beginning.

== Current definition ==
The definition of "Family" in the EWS reservation means: "The person who seeks the benefit of reservation, his/her parents and siblings below the age of 18 years as also his/her spouse and children below the age of 18 years".

- Candidate's annual family income must be less than Rs. 8 lakhs per annum.
- Their family must not own more than 5 acres of agriculture land.
- The residential flat area should be below 1000 sq ft.
- The residential plot's area should be below 100 square yards if in a notified municipality sector.
- The residential plot's area should be below 200 square yards if in a non-notified municipality sector.

EWS certificate can be used to avail the 10% reservation for the GEN-Economically Weaker Section in higher education all over the India and government jobs.

== Eligibility Criteria Across States ==
While the eligibility criteria for EWS reservations in the union government programmes are uniform across the country, its implementation in various states differs. Andhra Pradesh, Bihar, Chhattisgarh, Delhi, Goa, Gujarat, Haryana, Himachal Pradesh, Jharkhand, Karnataka, Kerala, Madhya Pradesh, Rajasthan, Uttar Pradesh, Uttarakhand, and West Bengal have adopted EWS quota.

=== Conformity with Central EWS Criteria ===
Several Indian states have adopted the EWS reservation criteria established by the Central Government. These states include Andhra Pradesh, Bihar, Chhattisgarh, Delhi, Goa, Gujarat, Haryana, Himachal Pradesh, Jharkhand, Karnataka, Madhya Pradesh, Rajasthan, Uttar Pradesh, Uttarakhand, and West Bengal.

=== Kerala ===
On October 21, 2019, the Kerala Cabinet decided to amend the State and Subordinate Service Rules and implement the EWS scheme. The Cabinet noted that the implementation did not affect the existing reservation categories. A panel headed by the retired judge, KS Sasidharan Nair, was appointed by the government to set the criteria for EWS in the state. The Indian Union Muslim League (IUML), the Welfare Party of India and the Social Democratic Party of India (SDPI), and the Sree Narayana Dharma Paripalana (SNDP) Yogam had come out against the move. After studying the report, the government implemented its suggestions after some modifications. Under this, eligibility for EWS was changed for higher education and jobs in the state of Kerala.

- Candidate's annual family income should be less than Rs. 4 lakhs per annum.
- Person's family must not hold more than 2.5 acres of land in a panchayat area, 75 cents of land in a municipal area or 50 cents in a municipal corporation area.
- Person's family must not hold house plots having an area of more than 20 cents in a municipality area or more than 15 cents in a municipal corporation area.

=== Maharashtra ===
In June 2021, the tripartite Maha Vikas Aghadi (MVA) government in Maharashtra announced that the Maratha Community can now avail of benefits under the Economically Weaker Section (EWS) quota.

== See also ==
- Scheduled Castes and Scheduled Tribes
- Creamy layer
- Other Backward Castes
