= Creamy layer =

Term used in Indian politics

Creamy layer is a term used in reservation system of India to refer to some members of a backward class who are highly advanced socially as well as economically and educationally. They constitute the forward section of that particular backward class – as forward as any other forward class member. They are not eligible for government-sponsored educational and professional benefit programs. The term was introduced by the Sattanathan Commission in 1971, which directed that the "creamy layer" should be excluded from the reservations (quotas) of civil posts. It was also identified later by Justice Ram Nandan Committee in 1993.

In the Indian judiciary, the concept was first introduced by V.R. Krishna Iyer in the State of Kerala v. NM Thomas, and was developed in Indra Sawhney v. Union of India.

The creamy layer (income) criteria were defined as the gross annual income of parents from all sources more than 100,000 rupees (₹ or INR defined by Sattanathan Committee in 1971) In 1993 when "creamy layer" ceiling was introduced, it was ₹ 1 lakh. It was subsequently revised to Rs 2.5 lakh per annum in (2004), and revised to ₹ 4.5 lakh (2008), Rs 6 lakh (2013) and Rs 8 lakh (2017). In October 2015, the National Commission for Backward Classes (NCBC) proposed that a person belonging to Other Backward Class (OBC) with gross annual income of parents up to Rs 15 lakh should be considered as the minimum ceiling for OBC. The NCBC also recommended the sub-division of OBCs into "backward", "more backward", and "extremely backward" blocs and divide 27% quota amongst them in proportion to their population, to ensure that stronger OBCs don't corner the quota benefits. On 1 August 2024, the Supreme Court ruled that states must identify and exclude the creamy layer within the Scheduled Castes and Scheduled Tribes from receiving reservation benefits.

== Classification ==
The Supreme Court of India defined the "creamy layer", quoting an Indian governmental office memorandum dated 8 September 1993. The term was originally introduced in the context of reservation of jobs for certain groups in Indra Sawhney & Others v. Union of India case in 1992. The Supreme Court has said that the benefit of reservation should not be given to OBC children of constitutional functionaries—such as the President, Judges of the Supreme Court and High Courts, employees of central and state bureaucracies above a certain level, public sector employees, and members of the armed forces and paramilitary personnel above the rank of colonel. Those from scheduled castes (SCs) and in scheduled tribes (STs) are exempt from this classification, and always receive the benefits of reservation regardless of family income. Those not from preferred groups do not now receive the benefit of reservation regardless of how low the family income.

The children of persons engaged in trade, industry and professions such as a doctor, lawyer, chartered accountant, income tax consultant, financial or management consultant, dental surgeon, engineer, computer specialist, film artists and other film professional, author, playwright, sports person, sports professional, media professional or any other vocations of like status whose annual income is more than ₹ 800,000 (Rs 8 lakh) for a period of three consecutive years are also excluded. [OBC children belong to any family earning a total gross annual income (from sources other than salary and agricultural land) of less than Rs 6 lakh for a period of three consecutive year—as the 1993 income ceiling for the creamy layer was raised from ₹ 100,000 (Rs 1 lakh, when the office memo was accepted) to Rs 6 lakh for a period of three consecutive years (in May 2013). Individuals belonging to the creamy layer are also excluded from being categorised as "socially and educationally backward" regardless of their social/educational backwardness.

== Application on SC/ST quota ==
The 'creamy layer' categorisation was meant only for the OBCs until 30 September 2018 but now is also applied to the Scheduled Castes and Scheduled Tribes. It was argued that it is not on an economic basis rather on the basis of untouchability or backwardness. This applied only to reservations in promotion and the rest remain the same. In December 2019, the Central Government appealed in the Supreme Court against the previous order of applicability of creamy layer to the SC/ST quota. In August 2024, the Supreme Court made a ruling that states must identify and exclude the creamy layer within the SCs/STs from receiving reservation benefits, as the concept of the creamy layer undermines equality considerations and ensures that reservation benefits reach the economically and socially disadvantaged. Union Government of India said that as per Babasaheb Dr B. R. Ambedkar's Constitution there cannot be any creamy layer in SC and ST Reservation and therefore it will not be implemented. Union Government took this decision because Discrimination with SC and ST communities does not happen on the basis of economic conditions.

== See also ==
- Caste politics
