= Indra Sawhney and Others v. Union of India =

Indian public interest litigation case

Indra Sawhney v. Union of India
- Court: Supreme Court of India
- Full case name: Indra Sawhney & Ors. v. Union of India
- Decided: 16 November 1992
- Citation: AIR 1993 SC 477; 1992 Supp 2 SCR 454

Case history
- Subsequent action: See below

Court membership
- Judges sitting: M.H. Kania (CJ), M. N. Venkatachaliah, S. R. Pandian, Dr. T.K. Thommen, A.M. Ahmadi, Kuldip Singh, P.B. Sawant, R.M. Sahai, B.P. Jeevan Reddy
- Chief judge: Bibek mandal

Case opinions
- Decision by: Kania C.J., Venkatachaliah, Ahmadi and B.P. Jeevan Reddy, JJ.
- Majority: Kania CJ., Venkatachaliah, Pandian, Ahmadi, Sawant and B.P. Jeevan Reddy JJ.
- Concur/dissent: Pandian J., Sawant J., and Ahmadi J.
- Dissent: Dr. Thommen J., Singh J., and Sahai J.

Indra Sawhney & Others v. Union of India also known as the Mandal verdict was an Indian landmark public interest litigation case delivered by a 9-judge constitution bench of the Supreme Court of India.

== Facts ==
The constitution recognized social and educational backwardness, but not economic backwardness. The court upheld separate reservation for OBC in Central Government jobs, but excluded these to the "creamy layer" (the forward section of a backward class, above a certain income). At no point should the reservation exceed 50%.

The genesis of the debate was in 1980, when the Second Backward Classes Committee, headed by BP Mandal, submitted its report. The report recommended 27 percent reservation for Other Backward Classes (OBCs) and 22.5 percent for the Scheduled Castes/Scheduled Tribes.

The Central government, however, acted on the report a decade later, by issuing an office memorandum (OM), providing 27 percent vacancies for Socially and Educationally Backward Classes to be filled by direct recruitment.

Indra Sawhney, the petitioner in this case, made three principal arguments against the Order:

- The extension of reservation violated the Constitutional guarantee of equality of opportunity.
- Caste was not a reliable indicator of backwardness.
- The efficiency of public institutions was at risk.

The five-judge Bench of the Supreme Court issued a stay on the operation of the Government Order of 13 August till the final disposal of the case.

== Judgement ==
On 16 November 1992, the Supreme Court, in its verdict, upheld the government order, being of the opinion that caste was an acceptable indicator of backwardness. Thus, the recommendation of reservations for OBCs in central government services was finally implemented in 1992. The Supreme Court of India gave verdict that 27% central government reservation for OBCs is valid. However, some states denied the existence of the creamy layer, and a report commissioned by the supreme court was implemented. The case was pressed again in 1999 and, in 2006, the supreme court reaffirmed the creamy layer exclusion and extended it to SCs and STs. This judgement also overruled General Manager Southern Railway v. Rangachari and Akhil Bharatiya Soshit Karamchari Sangh (Railway) v. Union of India verdicts, which said that reservations could be made in promotions as well as appointments. Indra Sawhney v. Union of India held that reservations cannot be applied in promotions.

1992 Indra Sawhney & Others v. Union of India judgment laid down the limits of the state's powers: it upheld the ceiling of 50 per cent quotas, emphasized the concept of "social backwardness", and prescribed 11 indicators to ascertain backwardness. The nine-Judge Bench judgement also established the concept of qualitative exclusion, such as "creamy layer". The creamy layer is only applicable in the case of Other Backward Castes and not applicable on other group like SC or ST. The creamy layer criterion was introduced at Rs 100,000 in 1993, and revised to Rs 250,000 in 2004, Rs 450,000 in 2008, Rs 600,000 in 2013 and 800,000 in 2015.

== See also ==
- Mandal Commission
- Reservation policy in Tamil Nadu
- Reservation policy in Bihar
- Odisha Govt Jobs
