= Caste system in India =

Social classification practised in India

In India, social classification based on caste has its origin in ancient times. It was transformed by various ruling elites in medieval, early-modern, and modern India, especially in the aftermath of the collapse of the Mughal Empire and the establishment of the British Raj. Caste is traditionally associated with Hinduism, but is more pervasive in extent: an estimated 98% of contemporary Indians, including Hindus, Muslims, Christians, Sikhs, Buddhists, and Jains, identify with a caste.

Beginning in ancient India, the caste system was originally centered around varna, with Brahmins (priests) and, to a lesser extent, Kshatriyas (rulers and warriors) serving as the elite classes, followed by Vaishyas (traders and merchants) and finally Shudras (labourers). Outside of this system are the oppressed, marginalised, and persecuted Dalits (also known as "Untouchables") and Adivasis (tribals). Over time, the system became increasingly rigid, and the emergence of jati led to further entrenchment, introducing thousands of new castes and sub-castes. With the arrival of Islamic rule, caste-like distinctions were formulated in certain Muslim communities, primarily in North India. The British Raj furthered the system, through census classifications and preferential treatment to Christians and people belonging to certain castes. Social unrest during the 1920s led to a change in this policy towards affirmative action.

Caste-based differences have also been practised in other regions and religions in the Indian subcontinent, like Nepalese Buddhism, Christianity, Islam, Judaism and Sikhism. It has been challenged by many reformist Hindu movements, Buddhism, Sikhism, Christianity, and present-day Neo Buddhism. With Indian influences, the caste system is also practiced in Bali, Indonesia.

After achieving independence in 1947, India banned discrimination on the basis of caste and enacted many affirmative action policies for the upliftment of historically marginalised groups, as enforced through its constitution. However, the system continues to be practiced in India and caste-based discrimination, segregation, violence, and inequality persist.

== Definitions and concepts ==
=== Varna, jāti, and caste ===
==== Varna ====
Varna, meaning type, order, colour, or class is a framework for grouping people into classes, first used in Vedic Indian society. It is referred to frequently in the ancient Indian texts. There are four classes: the Brahmins (priestly class), the Kshatriyas (rulers, administrators and warriors; also called Rajanyas), the Vaishyas (artisans, merchants, tradesmen and farmers), and the Shudras (labouring classes). The varna categorisation implicitly includes a fifth element, those deemed to be entirely outside its scope, such as tribal people and the Dalits (also known as "Untouchables").

==== Jati ====
In ancient texts, Jati, meaning birth, is mentioned less often and clearly distinguished from varna. There are four varnas but thousands of jatis. The jatis are complex social groups that lack universally applicable definitions or characteristics and have been more flexible and diverse than was previously often assumed.

Certain scholars of caste have considered jati to have its basis in religion, assuming that the sacred elements of life in India envelop the secular aspects; for example, the anthropologist Louis Dumont described the ritual rankings that exist within the jati system as being based on the concepts of religious purity and pollution. This view has been disputed by other scholars who believe it to be a secular social phenomenon driven by the necessities of economics, politics, and at times geography. Jeaneane Fowler says that although some people consider jati to be occupational segregation, in reality the jati framework does not preclude or prevent a member of one caste from working in another occupation.

A feature of jatis has been endogamy, in Susan Bayly's words, that "both in the past and for many, though not all Indians in more modern times, those born into a given caste would normally expect to find marriage partner" within their jati.

A 2016 study based on the DNA analysis of unrelated Indians determined that endogamous jatis originated during the Gupta Empire. An earlier 2013 study from Tamil Nadu has suggested older (4–6 Kya) origins of endogamy based upon male lineages.

Jatis have existed in India among Hindus, Muslims, Christians, and tribal people, and there is no clear linear order among them.

==== Caste ====
The term caste is derived from the Portuguese and Spanish word casta, meaning "race, lineage, breed" and, originally, "'pure or unmixed (stock or breed)". Originally not an Indian word, it is now widely used in English and in Indian languages, closely translated to varna and jati.

=== Ghurye's 1932 description ===
The sociologist G. S. Ghurye wrote in 1932 that, despite much study by many people,

we do not possess a real general definition of caste. It appears to me that any attempt at definition is bound to fail because of the complexity of the phenomenon. On the other hand, much literature on the subject is marred by lack of precision about the use of the term.

Ghurye offered what he thought was a definition that could be applied across India, although he acknowledged that there were regional variations on the general theme. His model definition for caste included the following six characteristics:

- Segmentation of society into groups whose membership was determined by birth.
- A hierarchical system wherein generally the Brahmins were at the head of the hierarchy, but this hierarchy was disputed in some cases. In various linguistic areas, hundreds of castes had a gradation generally acknowledged by everyone.
- Restrictions on feeding and social intercourse, with minute rules on the kind of food and drink that upper castes could accept from lower castes. There was a great diversity in these rules, and lower castes generally accepted food from upper castes.
- Segregation, where individual castes lived together, the dominant caste living in the center and other castes living on the periphery. There were restrictions on the use of water wells or streets by one caste on another: an upper-caste Brahmin might not be permitted to use the street of a lower-caste group, while a caste considered impure might not be permitted to draw water from a well used by members of other castes.
- Occupation, generally inherited. Lack of unrestricted choice of profession, caste members restricted their own members from taking up certain professions they considered degrading. This characteristic of caste was missing from large parts of India, stated Ghurye, and in these regions all four castes (Brahmins, Kshatriyas, Vaishyas and Shudras) did agriculture labour or became warriors in large numbers.
- Endogamy, restrictions on marrying a person outside caste, but in some situations hypergamy allowed. Far less rigidity on inter-marriage between different sub-castes than between members of different castes in some regions, while in some, endogamy within a sub-caste was the principal feature of caste-society.

The above Ghurye's model of caste thereafter attracted scholarly criticism for relying on the census reports produced by the colonial government, the "superior, inferior" racist theories of H. H. Risley, and for fitting his definition to then prevalent orientalist perspectives on caste.

Ghurye added, in 1932, that the colonial construction of caste led to the livening up, divisions and lobbying to the British officials for favourable caste classification in India for economic opportunities, and this had added new complexities to the concept of caste. Graham Chapman and others have reiterated the complexity and they note that there are differences between theoretical constructs and the practical reality.

=== Modern perspective on definition ===
Ronald Inden, the Indologist, agrees that there has been no universally accepted definition of "caste". For example, for some early European documenters it was thought to correspond with the endogamous varnas referred to in ancient Indian scripts, and its meaning corresponds in the sense of estates. To later Europeans of the Raj era it was endogamous jatis, rather than varnas, that represented caste, such as the 2,378 jatis that colonial administrators classified by occupation in the early 20th century.

Arvind Sharma, a professor of comparative religion, notes that caste has been used synonymously to refer to both varna and jati but that "serious Indologists now observe considerable caution in this respect" because, while related, the concepts are considered to be distinct. In this he agrees with the Indologist Arthur Basham, who noted that the Portuguese colonists of India used casta to describe

... tribes, clans or families. The name stuck and became the usual word for the Hindu social group. In attempting to account for the remarkable proliferation of castes in 18th- and 19th-century India, authorities credulously accepted the traditional view that by a process of intermarriage and subdivision the 3,000 or more castes of modern India had evolved from the four primitive classes, and the term 'caste' was applied indiscriminately to both varna or class, and jati or caste proper. This is a false terminology; castes rise and fall in the social scale, and old castes die out and new ones are formed, but the four great classes are stable. There are never more or less than four and for over 2,000 years their order of precedence has not altered."

The sociologist André Beteille notes that, while varna mainly played the role of caste in classical Hindu literature, it is jati that plays that role in present times. Varna represents a closed collection of social orders whereas jati is entirely open-ended, thought of as a "natural kind whose members share a common substance". Any number of new jatis can be added depending on need, such as tribes, sects, denominations, religious or linguistic minorities and nationalities. Thus, "Caste" is not an accurate representation of jati in English. Better terms would be ethnicity, ethnic identity and ethnic group.

=== Complexity and flexibility ===
Research on caste systems across the Indian subcontinent during the latter 1900s revealed that caste was far more complex and dynamic than previously thought. While British colonial authorities had portrayed it as a uniform, rigid system fundamental to Indian society, studies showed that caste's significance and structure varied considerably between regions. Rather than being a fixed hierarchy, caste functioned as one of several possible forms of social organization and identity. People could maintain multiple community affiliations, with caste sometimes taking precedence and other times being secondary to different social bonds. This flexibility allowed caste to serve as one way of creating social cohesion while leaving room for other types of community ties to flourish.

Sociologist Anne Waldrop observes that while outsiders view the term caste as a static phenomenon of stereotypical tradition-bound India, empirical facts suggest caste has been a radically changing feature. The term means different things to different Indians. In the context of politically active modern India, where job and school quotas are reserved for affirmative action based on castes, the term has become a sensitive and controversial subject.

Sociologists such as M. N. Srinivas and Damle have debated the question of rigidity in caste and believe that there is considerable flexibility and mobility in the caste hierarchies.

=== Contemporary extent and enumeration ===
Between 2019 and 2020, Pew Research interviewed 29,999 Indian adults, finding that 98% of Indians identified as members of a caste when asked.

The question of if and how to enumerate caste is politically fraught in its own right. No census under the Republic of India has enumerated caste, on the premise that doing so would be socially divisive; the last Indian census to do so was in 1931, under British rule. The 15th census in 2011 did not count caste, but an associated Socio Economic and Caste Census was conducted outside the scope of the 1948 Census of India Act. The 16th census, which as of 2026 is scheduled to enumerate population data in 2027, is anticipated to ask each individual to declare a jati.

== Origins ==
Caste system in 19th century India
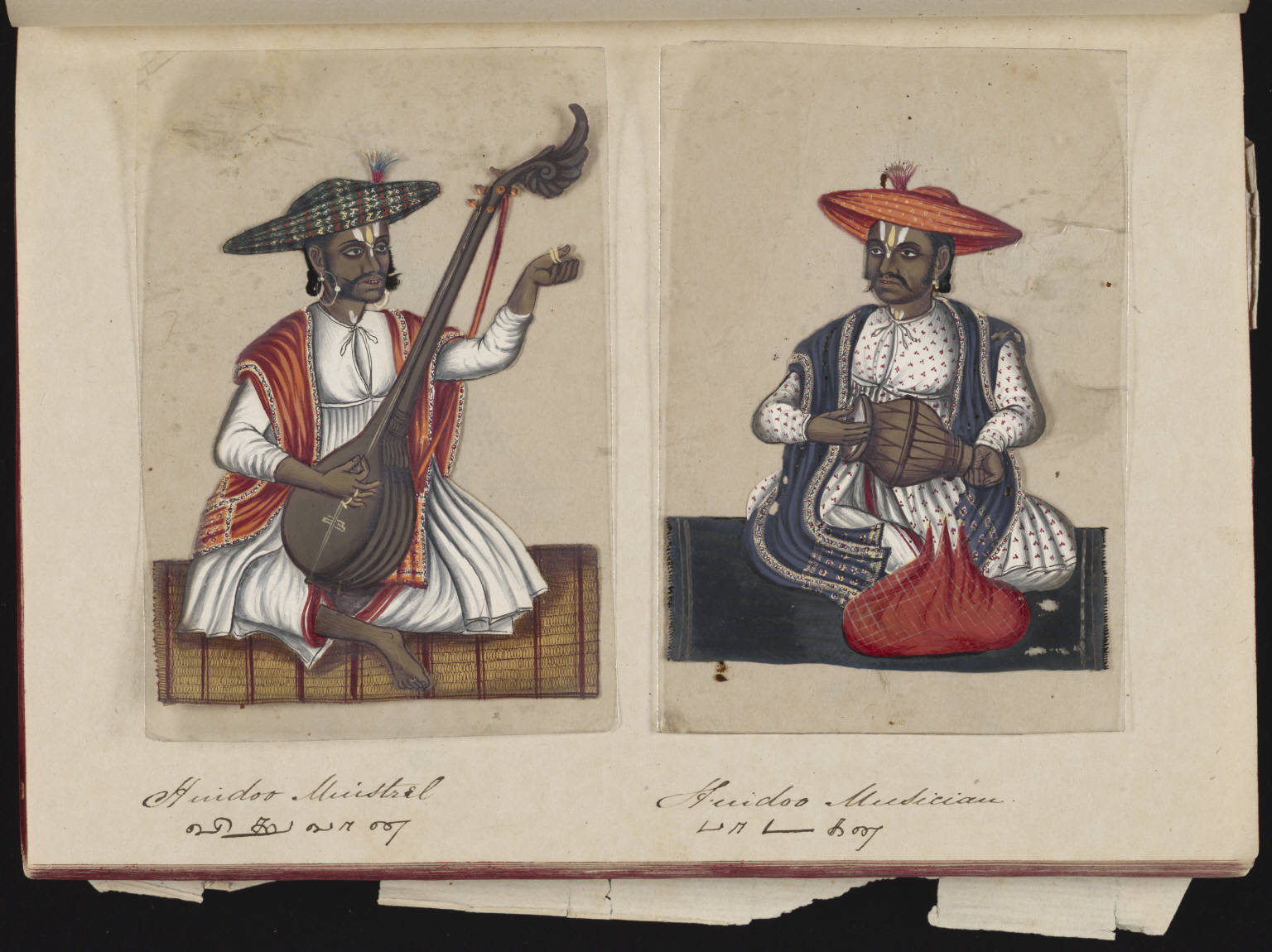
Hindu musician

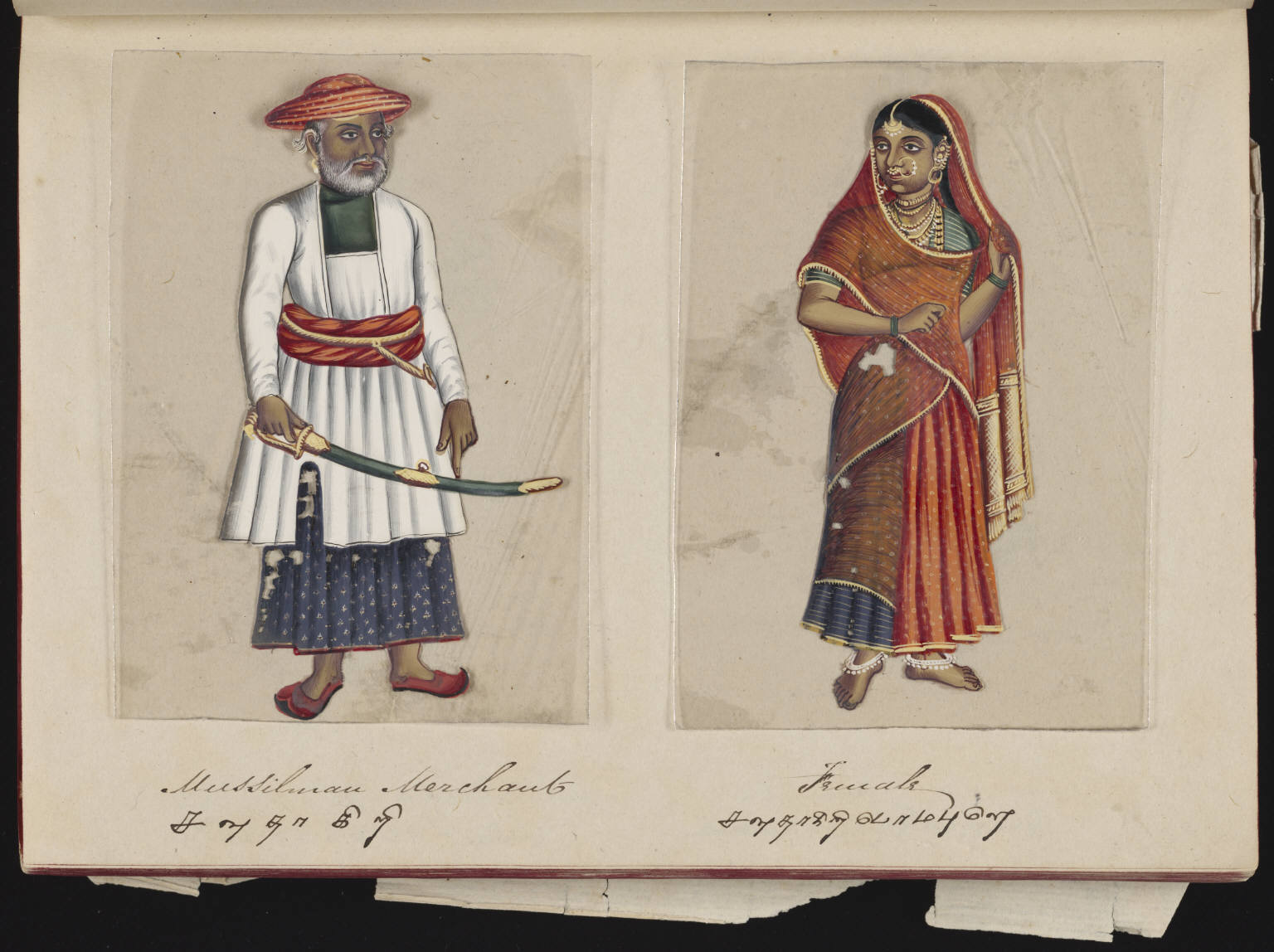
Muslim merchant

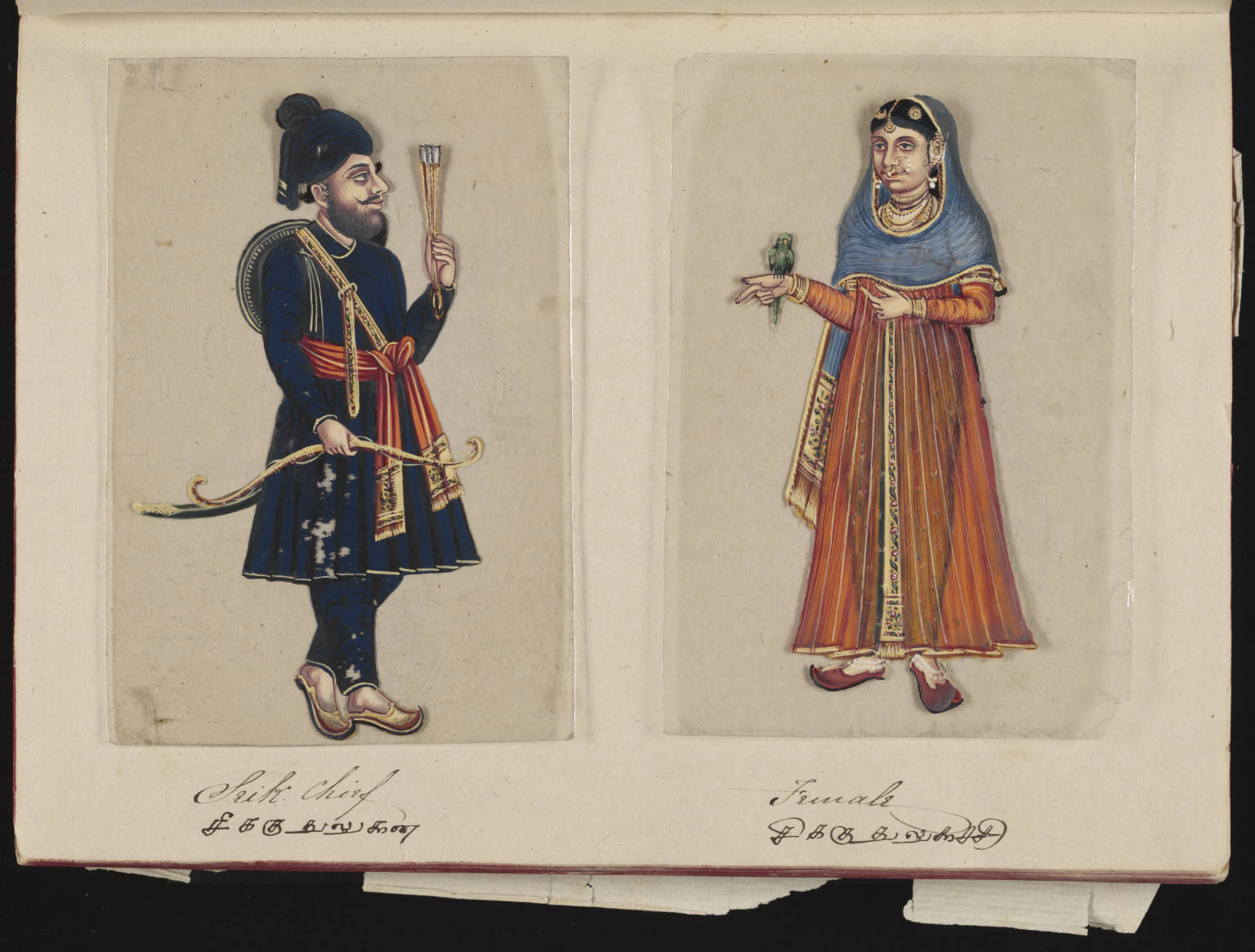
Sikh chief

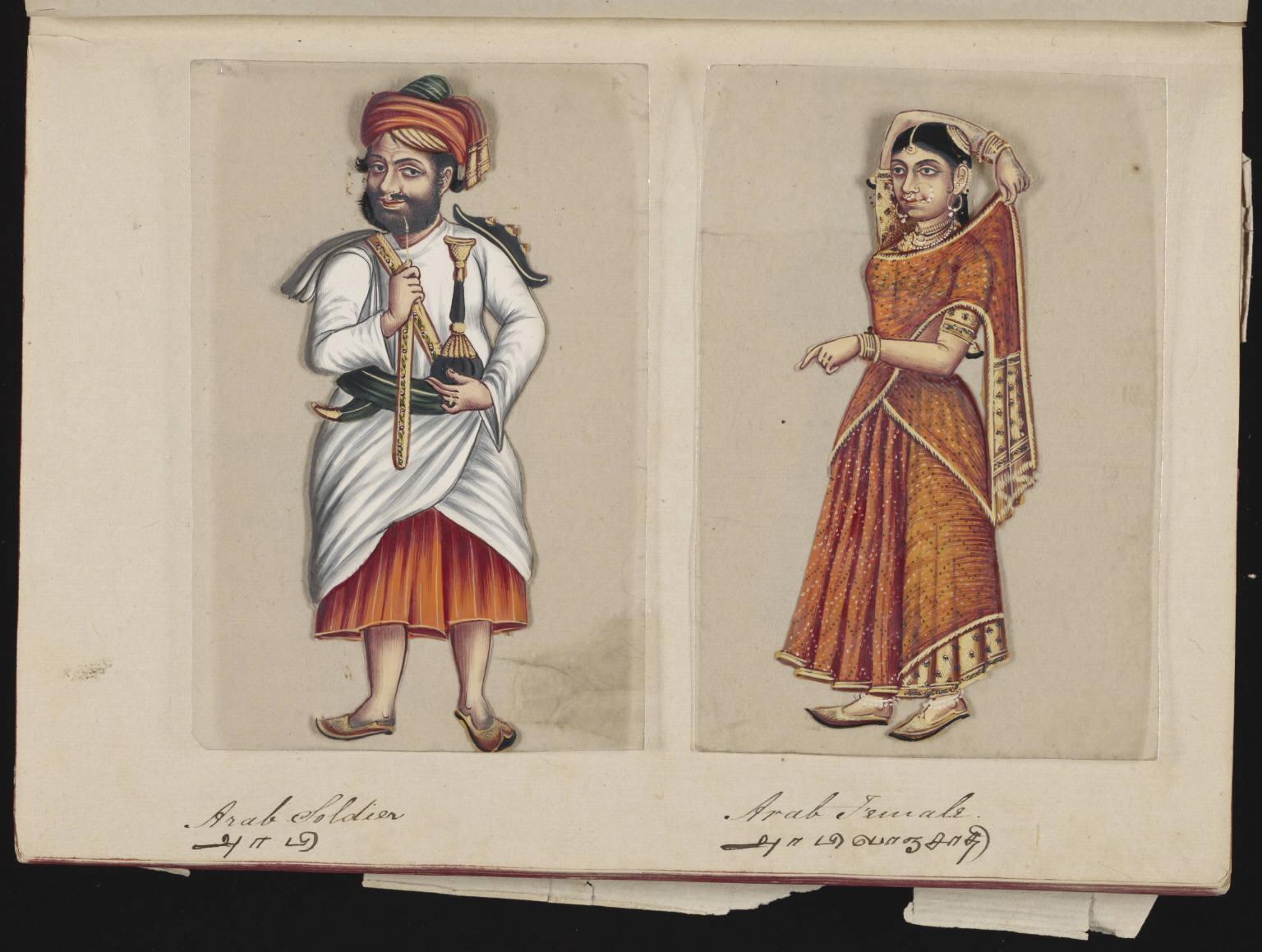
Arab soldier
Pages from Seventy-two Specimens of Castes in India according to Christian Missionaries in February 1837. They include Hindu, Muslim, Sikh and Arabs as castes of India.

=== Perspectives ===
There are at least two perspectives for the origins of the caste system in ancient and medieval India, which focus on either ideological factors or on socio-economic factors.

- The first school of thought focuses on ideological factors that are claimed to drive the caste system and hold that caste is rooted in the four varnas. This perspective was particularly common among scholars during the British colonial era and was articulated by Dumont, who concluded that the system was ideologically perfected several thousand years ago and has remained the primary social reality ever since. This school primarily justifies its theory by citing the ancient law book Manusmriti and has been criticized for disregarding economic, political and historical evidence.
- The second school of thought focuses on socioeconomic factors, claiming that those factors drive the caste system. It believes caste to be rooted in the economic, political and material history of India. This school, which is common among scholars of the post-colonial era such as Berreman, Marriott, and Dirks, describes the caste system as an ever-evolving social reality that can only be properly understood by the study of historical evidence of actual practice and the examination of verifiable circumstances in the economic, political and material history of India. This school has focused on the historical evidence from ancient and medieval society in India, during the Muslim rule between the 12th and 18th centuries, and the policies of the British colonial government from the 18th century to the mid-20th century.

The first school has focused on religious anthropology and disregarded other historical evidence as secondary or derivative of this tradition. The second school has focused on sociological evidence and sought to understand the historical circumstances. The latter has criticised the former for its caste origin theory, claiming that it has dehistoricized and decontextualised Indian society.

=== Ritual kingship model ===
According to Samuel, referencing George L. Hart, central aspects of the later Indian caste system may originate from the ritual kingship system prior to the arrival of Brahmanism, Buddhism and Jainism in India. The system is seen in the South Indian Tamil literature from the Sangam period (3rd BCE-3rd c.CE). This theory discards the Indo-Aryan varna model as the basis of caste, and is centred on the ritual power of the king, who was "supported by a group of ritual and magical specialists of low social status", with their ritual occupations being considered 'polluted'. According to Hart, it may be this model that provided the concerns with "pollution" of the members of low status groups. The Hart model for caste origin, writes Samuel, envisions "the ancient Indian society consisting of a majority without internal caste divisions and a minority consisting of a number of small occupationally polluted groups".

=== Vedic varnas ===
The varnas originated in late Vedic society (c. 1000–500 BCE). The first three groups, Brahmins, Kshatriyas and Vaishya, have parallels with other Indo-European societies, while the addition of the Shudras is probably a Brahmanical invention from northern India.

The varna system is propounded in revered Hindu religious texts, and understood as idealised human callings. The Purusha Sukta of the Rigveda and Manusmriti's comment on it, being the oft-cited texts. Counter to these textual classifications, many revered Hindu texts and doctrines question and disagree with this system of social classification.

Scholars have questioned the varna verse in the Rigveda, noting that the varna therein is mentioned only once. The Purusha Sukta verse is now generally considered to have been inserted at a later date into the Rigveda, probably as a charter myth. Stephanie Jamison and Joel Brereton, professors of Sanskrit and Religious studies, state, "there is no evidence in the Rigveda for an elaborate, much-subdivided and overarching caste system", and "the varna system seems to be embryonic in the Rigveda and, both then and later, a social ideal rather than a social reality". In contrast to the lack of details about varna system in the Rigveda, the Manusmriti includes an extensive and highly schematic commentary on the varna system, but it too provides "models rather than descriptions". Susan Bayly summarises that Manusmriti and other scriptures helped elevate Brahmins in the social hierarchy and these were a factor in the making of the varna system, but the ancient texts did not in some way "create the phenomenon of caste" in India.

=== Jatis ===
Jeaneane Fowler, a professor of philosophy and religious studies, states that it is impossible to determine how and why the jatis came into existence. Susan Bayly, on the other hand, suggests that the jati system emerged because it offered a source of advantage in an era of pre-Independence poverty, lack of institutional human rights, volatile political environment, and economic insecurity.

According to social anthropologist Dipankar Gupta, guilds developed during the Mauryan period and crystallised into jatis in post-Mauryan times with the emergence of feudalism in India, which finally crystallised during the 7th–12th centuries. However, other scholars dispute when and how jatis developed in Indian history. Barbara Metcalf and Thomas Metcalf, both professors of History, write, "One of the surprising arguments of fresh scholarship, based on inscriptional and other contemporaneous evidence, is that until relatively recent centuries, social organisation in much of the subcontinent was little touched by the four varnas. Nor were jati the building blocks of society."

According to Basham, ancient Indian literature refers often to varnas, but hardly if ever to jatis as a system of groups within the varnas. He concludes that "If caste is defined as a system of group within the class, which are normally endogamous, commensal and craft-exclusive, we have no real evidence of its existence until comparatively late times."

=== Untouchable outcastes and the varna system ===
The Vedic texts neither mention the concept of untouchable people nor any practice of untouchability. The rituals in the Vedas ask the noble or king to eat with the commoner from the same vessel. Later Vedic texts ridicule some professions, but the concept of untouchability is not found in them.

The post-Vedic texts, particularly Manusmriti mentions outcastes and suggests that they be ostracised. Recent scholarship states that the discussion of outcastes in post-Vedic texts is different from the system widely discussed in colonial era Indian literature, and in Dumont's structural theory on caste system in India. Patrick Olivelle, a professor of Sanskrit and Indian Religions and credited with modern translations of Vedic literature, Dharma-sutras and Dharma-sastras, states that ancient and medieval Indian texts do not support the ritual pollution, purity-impurity premise implicit in the Dumont theory. According to Olivelle, purity-impurity is discussed in the Dharma-sastra texts, but only in the context of the individual's moral, ritual and biological pollution (eating certain kinds of food such as meat, going to bathroom). Olivelle writes in his review of post-Vedic Sutra and Shastra texts, "we see no instance when a term of pure/impure is used with reference to a group of individuals or a varna or caste". The only mention of impurity in the Shastra texts from the 1st millennium is about people who commit grievous sins and thereby fall out of their varna. These, writes Olivelle, are called "fallen people" and considered impure in the medieval Indian texts. The texts declare that these sinful, fallen people be ostracised. Olivelle adds that the overwhelming focus in matters relating to purity/impurity in the Dharma-sastra texts concerns "individuals irrespective of their varna affiliation" and all four varnas could attain purity or impurity by the content of their character, ethical intent, actions, innocence or ignorance (acts by children), stipulations, and ritualistic behaviours.

Dumont, in his later publications, acknowledged that ancient varna hierarchy was not based on purity-impurity ranking principle, and that the Vedic literature is devoid of the untouchability concept.

== History ==
=== Early history ===
The existence of jati and the precursor of caste has been found in the Indus Valley Civilisation (3300–1700 BCE). Sociologist S C. Malik writes Indus Valley Civilization saw "perpetuation of caste status by birth" and "caste-class patterns" were found in Indian society since this period. Charles Maisels finds caste stratification to have arisen from occupational groups upon the devolution from urban Indus Valley society. Romila Thapar finds possibility of a caste as pre-Vedic element, and notes that Jati pre-dated Vedic varna. Thapar further notes that Jatis were derived from clans of Indus Valley Civilisation which saw emergence of different occupations that were inherited and became hierarchically organised with unequal access to resources with stringent marriage regulations and rituals becoming rigid system over a period of time. Archaeologist M.K. Dhavalikar has also supported existence of caste system in Indus Valley Civilisation.

=== Early Vedic period (1500–1000 BCE) ===
During the early Vedic period in northern India, when the Rigveda was composed (1500–1200 BC), there were only two varnas in the Vedic society: arya varna and dasa varna. The distinction originally arose from tribal divisions. The Vedic people were Indo-European-speaking tribes who migrated over a period of several centuries into northern South Asia from the Bactria-Margiana, and mixed with the "indigenous Dravidic-speaking populations", but regarded themselves as superior. The Vedic tribes regarded themselves as arya (the noble ones) and the rival tribes were called dasa, dasyu and pani. The dasas were frequent allies of the Aryan tribes, and they were probably assimilated into the Aryan society, giving rise to a class distinction. Many dasas were, however, in a servile position, giving rise to the eventual meaning of dasa as servant or slave.

The Rigvedic society was not distinguished by occupations. Many husbandmen and artisans practised a number of crafts. The chariot-maker (rathakara) and metal worker (karmara) enjoyed positions of importance and no stigma was attached to them. Similar observations hold for carpenters, tanners, weavers and others.

Towards the end of the Atharvaveda period, new class distinctions emerged. The erstwhile dasas are renamed Shudras, probably to distinguish them from the new meaning of dasa as slave. The aryas are renamed vis or Vaishya (meaning the members of the tribe) and the new elite classes of Brahmins (priests) and Kshatriyas (warriors) are designated as new varnas. The Shudras were not only the erstwhile dasas but also included the aboriginal tribes that were assimilated into the Aryan society as it expanded into Gangetic settlements. This class-distinction is still reflected in the fact that the upper castes have a relatively higher steppe ancestry than the lower castes.

There is no evidence of restrictions regarding food and marriage during the Vedic period. According to Moorjani et al. (2013), co-authored by Reich, extensive admixture took place between 2200 BCE and 100 CE (4200 to 1900 before present), whereafter India shifted to "a region in which mixture was rare". In southern India, endogamy may have set in 1000 years earlier. (Note: Bronkhorst 2020, p. 203, note 65 notes that Moorjani et al. (2013) "leaves us with the suspicion that endogamy had been adopted in the Dravidian south a full thousand years before the north, thus suggesting that something like a "caste system existed there already before and independently of Brahmanical influences".)

=== Later Vedic period (1000–600 BC) ===
In an early Upanishad, Shudra is referred to as Pūşan or nourisher, suggesting that Shudras were the tillers of the soil. But soon afterwards, Shudras are not counted among the tax-payers and they are said to be given away along with the land when it is gifted. The majority of the artisans were also reduced to the position of Shudras, but there is no contempt indicated for their work. The Brahmins and the Kshatriyas are given a special position in the rituals, distinguishing them from both the Vaishyas and the Shudras. The Vaishya is said to be "oppressed at will" and the Shudra "beaten at will".

=== Second urbanisation (500–200 BC) ===
Knowledge of this period is supplemented by Pali Buddhist texts. Whereas the Brahmanical texts speak of the four-fold varna system, the Buddhist texts present an alternative picture of the society, stratified along the lines of jati, kula and occupation. It is likely that the varna system, while being a part of the Brahmanical ideology, was not practically operative in the society. In the Buddhist texts, Brahmin and Kshatriya are described as jatis rather than varnas. They were in fact the jatis of high rank. The jatis of low rank were mentioned as chandala and occupational classes like bamboo weavers, hunters, chariot-makers and sweepers. The concept of kulas was broadly similar. Along with Brahmins and Kshatriyas, a class called gahapatis (literally householders, but effectively propertied classes) was also included among high kulas. The people of high kulas were engaged in occupations of high rank, viz., agriculture, trade, cattle-keeping, computing, accounting and writing, and those of low kulas were engaged in low-ranked occupations such as basket-weaving and sweeping. The gahapatis were an economic class of land-holding agriculturists, who employed dasa-kammakaras (slaves and hired labourers) to work on the land. The gahapatis were the primary taxpayers of the state. This class was apparently not defined by birth, but by individual economic growth.

While there was an alignment between kulas and occupations at least at the high and low ends, there was no strict linkage between class/caste and occupation, especially among those in the middle range. Many occupations listed such as accounting and writing were not linked to jatis. Peter Masefield, in his review of caste in India, states that anyone could in principle perform any profession. The texts state that the Brahmin took food from anyone, suggesting that strictures of commensality were as yet unknown. The Nikaya texts also imply that endogamy was not mandated.

The contestations of the period are also evident from the texts describing dialogues of Buddha with the Brahmins. The Brahmins maintain their divinely ordained superiority and assert their right to draw service from the lower orders. Buddha responds by pointing out the basic facts of biological birth common to all men and asserts that the ability to draw service is obtained economically, not by divine right. Using the example of the northwest of the subcontinent, Buddha points out that aryas could become dasas and vice versa. This form of social mobility was endorsed by Buddha.

=== Early Hinduism (200 BC–320 AD) and Classical period (320–650 AD) ===
According to Moorjani et al. (2013), endogamy set in after 100 CE. According to Basu et al. (2016), admixture between populations was "rapidly replaced by endogamy [...] among upper castes and Indo-European speakers predominantly[...] almost simultaneously, possibly by decree of the rulers, in upper-caste populations of all geographical regions, about 70 generations before present, probably during the reign (319–550 CE) of the ardent Hindu Gupta rulers". Johannes Bronkhorst, referring to Basu et al. (2016) and Moorjani et al. (2013) states that "it seems safe to conclude that a shift to endogamy took place during the first half of the first millennium CE, at least in northern India", due to the growing influence of Brahmanism. This shift is attested in the Manusmriti (1st to 3rd century CE), which "explicitly forbade intermarriage across castes".

The Mahabharata, estimated to have been completed by the end of the fourth century CE, discusses the varna system in section 12.181, presenting two models. The first model describes varna as a colour-based system, through a character named Bhrigu, "Brahmins varna was white, Kshatriyas was red, Vaishyas was yellow, and the Shudras' black". This description is questioned by Bharadvaja who says that colors are seen among all the varnas, that desire, anger, fear, greed, grief, anxiety, hunger and toil prevails over all human beings, that bile and blood flow from all human bodies, so what distinguishes the varnas, he asks. The Mahabharata then declares, "There is no distinction of varnas. This whole universe is Brahman. It was created formerly by Brahma, came to be classified by acts." The epic then recites a behavioural model for varna, that those who were inclined to anger, pleasures and boldness attained the Kshatriya varna; those who were inclined to cattle rearing and living off the plough attained the Vaishya varna; those who were fond of violence, covetousness and impurity attained the Shudra varna. The Brahmin class is modeled in the epic as the archetype default state of man dedicated to truth, austerity and pure conduct. In the Mahabharata and pre-medieval era Hindu texts, according to Hiltebeitel, "it is important to recognise, in theory, varna is nongenealogical. The four varnas are not lineages, but categories".

=== Late classical and early medieval period (650 to 1400) ===
Scholars have tried to locate historical evidence for the existence and nature of varna and jati in documents and inscriptions of medieval India. Supporting evidence has been elusive and contradictory evidence has emerged.

Varna is rarely mentioned in the extensive medieval era records of Andhra Pradesh, for example. This has led Cynthia Talbot, a professor of History and Asian Studies, to question whether varna was socially significant in the daily lives of this region. Most mentions of varna in the Andhra inscriptions come from Brahmins. Two rare temple donor records from warrior families of the 14th century claim to be Shudras. One states that Shudras are the bravest, the other states that Shudras are the purest. Richard Eaton, a professor of history, writes, "anyone could become a warrior regardless of social origins, nor do the jati—another pillar of alleged traditional Indian society—appear as features of people's identity. Occupations were fluid." Evidence shows, according to Eaton, that Shudras were part of the nobility, and many "father and sons had different professions, suggesting that social status was earned, not inherited" in the Hindu Kakatiya population in the Deccan region between the 11th and 14th centuries.

In the Tamil Nadu region of India, studied by Leslie Orr, a professor of religion, "Chola period inscriptions challenge our ideas about the structuring of (south Indian) society in general. In contrast to what Brahmanical legal texts may lead us to expect, we do not find that caste is the organising principle of society or that boundaries between different social groups are sharply demarcated." In Tamil Nadu, during ancient and medieval period, the Vellalar were the elite caste and major patrons of literature.

For the Northern Indian region, Susan Bayly writes, "until well into the colonial period, much of the subcontinent was still populated by people for whom the formal distinctions of caste were of only limited importance; even in parts of the so-called Hindu heartland of Gangetic upper India, the institutions and beliefs which are now often described as the elements of traditional caste were only just taking shape as recently as the early eighteenth century—that is, when the Mughal era was collapsing and western power was expanding into the subcontinent".

For western India, Dirk H. A. Kolff suggests open status social groups dominated Rajput history during the medieval period. He states, "The omnipresence of cognatic kinship and caste in North India is a relatively new phenomenon that only became dominant in the early Mughal and British periods respectively. Historically speaking, the alliance and the open status group, whether war band or religious sect, dominated medieval and early modern Indian history in a way descent and caste did not."

Adi Purana, an 8th-century text of Jainism by Jinasena, is the first mention of varna and jati in Jain literature. Jinasena does not trace the origin of varna system to Rigveda or to Purusha, but to the Bharata legend. According to this legend, Bharata performed an "ahimsa-test" (test of non-violence), and during that test all those who refused to harm any living beings were called as the priestly varna in ancient India, and Bharata called them dvija, twice born. Jinasena states that those who are committed to the principle of non-harming and non-violence to all living beings are deva-Brahmaṇas, divine Brahmins. The Ādi purāṇa (9th c.) also discusses the relationship between varna and jati. According to Padmanabh Jaini, a professor of Indic studies, in Jainism and Buddhism, the Adi Purana text states "there is only one jati called manusyajati or the human caste, but divisions arise on account of their different professions". The caste of Kshatriya arose, according to Jainism texts, when Rishabha procured weapons to serve the society and assumed the powers of a king, while Vaishya and Shudra castes arose from different means of livelihood they specialised in.

=== Medieval era, Islamic Sultanates and Mughal empire period (1000 to 1750) ===
Early and mid 20th century Muslim historians, such as Hashimi in 1927 and Qureshi in 1962, proposed that "caste system was established before the arrival of Islam", and it and "a nomadic savage lifestyle" in the northwest Indian subcontinent were the primary cause why Sindhi non-Muslims "embraced Islam in flocks" when Arab Muslim armies invaded the region. According to this hypothesis, the mass conversions occurred from the lower caste Hindus and Mahayana Buddhists who had become "corroded from within by the infiltration of Hindu beliefs and practices". This theory is now widely believed to be baseless and false.

Derryl MacLein, a professor of social history and Islamic studies, states that historical evidence does not support this theory; that whatever evidence is available suggests that Muslim institutions in north-west India legitimised and continued any inequalities that existed; and that neither Buddhists nor "lower caste" Hindus converted to Islam because they viewed Islam to lack a caste system. Conversions to Islam were rare, states MacLein, and conversions attested by historical evidence confirms that the few who did convert were Brahmin Hindus (theoretically, the upper caste). MacLein asserts that the caste and conversion theories about Indian society during the Islamic era are not based on historical evidence or verifiable sources, but rather on the personal assumptions of Muslim historians about the nature of Islam, Hinduism and Buddhism in the northwest Indian subcontinent.

Richard Eaton, a professor of history at Berkley, asserts that the presumption of a rigid Hindu caste system and the oppression of lower castes in pre-Islamic era in India is the cause of "mass conversion to Islam" during the medieval era. This claim has the problem that "no evidence can be found in support of the theory, and it is profoundly illogical".

Peter Jackson, a professor of Medieval History and Muslim India, writes that the speculative hypotheses about the caste system in Hindu states during the medieval Delhi Sultanate period (~1200 to 1500), and the existence of a caste system, as being responsible for Hindu weakness in resisting the plunder by Islamic armies, is appealing at first sight, but "they do not withstand closer scrutiny and historical evidence". Jackson states that, contrary to the theoretical model of caste where only Kshatriyas could be warriors and soldiers, historical evidence confirms that Hindu warriors and soldiers during the medieval era included members of other castes such as Vaishyas and Shudras. "Further", writes Jackson, "there is no evidence that there ever was a widespread conversion to Islam at the turn of twelfth century" by Hindus of lower caste. Jamal Malik, a professor of Islamic studies, extends this observation further, and states that "at no time in history did Hindus of low caste convert en masse to Islam".

Jamal Malik states that caste as a social stratification is a well-studied Indian system, yet evidence also suggests that hierarchical concepts, class consciousness and social stratification had already occurred in Islam before Islam arrived in India. The concept of caste, or 'qaum' in Islamic literature, is mentioned by a few Islamic historians of medieval India, states Malik, but these mentions relate to the fragmentation of the Muslim society in India. Zia al-Din al-Barani of Delhi Sultanate in his Fatawa-ye Jahandari and Abu al-Fadl from Akbar's court of Mughal Empire are the few Islamic court historians who mention caste. Zia al-Din al-Barani's discussion, however, is not about non-Muslim castes, rather a declaration of the supremacy of Ashraf caste over Ardhal caste among the Muslims, justifying it in Quranic text, with "aristocratic birth and superior genealogy being the most important traits of a human".

Irfan Habib, an Indian historian, states that Abu al-Fazl's Ain-i Akbari provides a historical record and census of the Jat peasant caste of Hindus in northern India, where the tax-collecting noble classes (Zamindars), the armed cavalry and infantry (warrior class) doubling up as the farming peasants (working class), were all of the same Jat caste in the 16th century. These occupationally diverse members from one caste served each other, writes Habib, either because of their reaction to taxation pressure of Muslim rulers or because they belonged to the same caste. Peasant social stratification and caste lineages were, states Habib, tools for tax revenue collection in areas under the Islamic rule.

The origin of caste system of modern form, in the Bengal region of India, may be traceable to this period, states Richard Eaton. The medieval era Islamic Sultanates in India utilised social stratification to rule and collect tax revenue from non-Muslims. Eaton states that, "Looking at Bengal's Hindu society as a whole, it seems likely that the caste system—far from being the ancient and unchanging essence of Indian civilisation as supposed by generations of Orientalists—emerged into something resembling its modern form only in the period 1200–1500".

=== Later-Mughal period (1700 to 1850) ===
Susan Bayly, an anthropologist, notes that "caste is not and never has been a fixed fact of Indian life" and the caste system as we know it today, as a "ritualised scheme of social stratification", developed in two stages during the post-Mughal period, in 18th and early 19th century. Three sets of value played an important role in this development: priestly hierarchy, kingship, and armed ascetics.

With the Islamic Mughal empire falling apart in the 18th century, regional post-Mughal ruling elites and new dynasties from diverse religious, geographical and linguistic background attempted to assert their power in different parts of India. Bayly states that these obscure post-Mughal elites associated themselves with kings, priests and ascetics, deploying the symbols of caste and kinship to divide their populace and consolidate their power. Additionally, in this fluid, stateless environment, some of the previously casteless segments of society grouped themselves into caste groups. However, in the 18th century, writes Bayly, India-wide networks of merchants, armed ascetics and armed tribal people often ignored these ideologies of caste. Most people did not treat caste norms as given absolutes writes Bayly, but challenged, negotiated and adapted these norms to their circumstances. Communities teamed in different regions of India, into "collective classing" to mold the social stratification in order to maximise assets and protect themselves from loss. The "caste, class, community" structure that formed became valuable in a time when state apparatus was fragmenting, was unreliable and fluid, when rights and life were unpredictable.

In this environment, states Rosalind O'Hanlon, a professor of Indian history, the newly arrived East India Company colonial officials, attempted to gain commercial interests in India by balancing Hindu and Muslim conflicting interests, and by aligning with regional rulers and large assemblies of military monks. The East India Company officials adopted constitutional laws segregated by religion and caste. The legal code and colonial administrative practice was largely divided into Muslim law and Hindu law, the latter including laws for Buddhists, Jains and Sikhs. In this transitory phase, Brahmins together with scribes, ascetics and merchants who accepted Hindu social and spiritual codes, became the deferred-to-authority on Hindu texts, law and administration of Hindu matters. (Note: Sweetman notes that the Brahmin had a strong influence on the British understanding of India, thereby also influencing the methods of British rule and western understandings of Hinduism, and gaining a stronger position in Indian society.)

While legal codes and state administration were emerging in India, with the rising power of the European powers, Dirks states that the late 18th-century British writings on India say little about caste system in India, and predominantly discuss territorial conquest, alliances, warfare and diplomacy in India. Colin Mackenzie, a British social historian of this time, collected vast numbers of texts on Indian religions, culture, traditions and local histories from south India and Deccan region, but his collection and writings have very little on caste system in 18th-century India.

=== During British rule (1857 to 1947) ===
Although the varnas and jatis have pre-modern origins, the caste system as it exists today is the result of developments during the post-Mughal period and the British colonial period, which made caste organisation a central mechanism of administration.

==== Basis ====
Jati were the basis of caste ethnology during the British colonial era. In the 1881 census and thereafter, colonial ethnographers used caste (jati) headings to count and classify people in what was then British India (now India, Pakistan, Bangladesh and Myanmar). The 1891 census included 60 sub-groups each subdivided into six occupational and racial categories, and the number increased in subsequent censuses. The colonial era census caste tables, states Susan Bayly, "ranked, standardised and cross-referenced jati listings for Indians on principles similar to zoology and botanical classifications, aiming to establish who was superior to whom by virtue of their supposed purity, occupational origins and collective moral worth". While bureaucratic colonial officials completed reports on their zoological classification of Indian people, some British officials criticised these exercises as being little more than a caricature of the reality of caste system in India. The colonial officials used the census-determined jatis to decide which group of people were qualified for which jobs in the colonial government, and people of which jatis were to be excluded as unreliable. These census caste classifications, states Gloria Raheja, a professor of anthropology, were also used by colonial officials over the late 19th century and early 20th century, to formulate land tax rates, as well as to frequently target some social groups as "criminal" castes and castes prone to "rebellion".

The population then comprised about 200 million people, across five major religions, and over 500,000 agrarian villages, each with a population between 100 and 1,000 people of various age groups, which were variously divided into numerous castes. This ideological scheme was theoretically composed of around 3,000 castes, which in turn was claimed to be composed of 90,000 local endogamous sub-groups.

The strict British class system may have influenced the British preoccupation with the Indian caste system as well as the British perception of pre-colonial Indian castes. British society's own similarly rigid class system provided the British with a template for understanding Indian society and castes. The British, coming from a society rigidly divided by class, attempted to equate India's castes with British social classes. According to David Cannadine, Indian castes merged with the traditional British class system during the British Raj.

==== Sanskritisation ====
Sanskritisation is often aimed to claim the Varna status of Brahmin or Kshatriyas, the two prestigious Varna of the Vedic-age Varna system. One of the main examples of that is various non-elite pastoral communities like Ahir, Gopa, Ahar, Goala etc. who adopted the Yadav word as part of a Sanskritisation effort to gain upward mobility in society during the late 19th century to early 20th century. Similar attempts were made by communities which were historically classed as non-elite tillers like Kurmi and various communities like Koeri, Murao, Nai etc. from the late 19th century onwards through their caste organisations by claiming higher social status. The spread of Sanskritisation under British rule saw a significant boost. The attempts at Sanskritisation by the lower-castes before British rule were resisted by the upper-castes.

According to Jaffrelot, the formation of Caste associations was a by-product of enumeration of caste in censuses undertaken by the British regime. Herbert Hope Risley, a colonial administrator who served as the census commissioner, decided to categorise castes in their local context and rank them accordingly into a Varna. This led to the creation of advocacy groups that sought upward mobility of their social and Varna status through sanskritisation. The Castes such as Kurmis, Gadariyas, Kachi, Jatavs, Lodhs and Ahirs underwent sanskritisation in order to claim Kshatriya status. Kalwar caste is traditionally involved into distillation and selling of liquor, but around the start of the 20th century, various organisations related to the caste sought to redefine the image of their community through this process.

==== Race science ====
Colonial administrator Herbert Hope Risley, an exponent of race science, used the ratio of the width of a nose to its height to divide Indians into Aryan and Dravidian races, as well as seven castes.

==== Enforcement ====
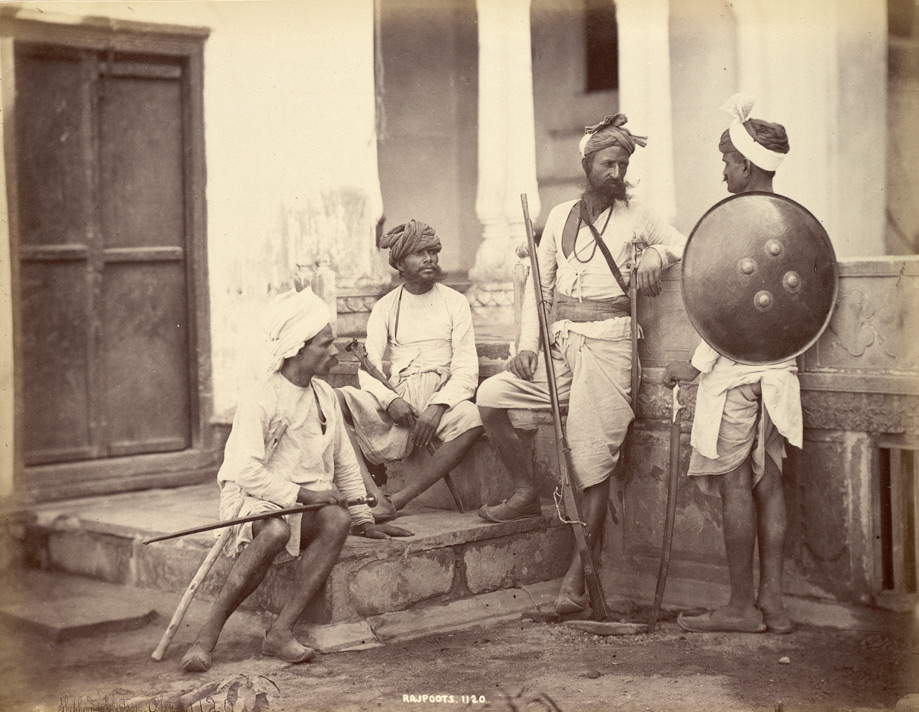
From the 1850s, photography was used in Indian subcontinent by the British for anthropological purposes, helping classify the different castes, tribes and native trades. Included in this collection were Hindu, Muslim and Buddhist (Sinhalese) people classified by castes. Above is an 1860s photograph of Rajputs, classified as a high Hindu caste.

===== Jobs for forward castes =====
The role of the British Raj on the caste system in India is controversial. The caste system became legally rigid during the Raj, when the British started to enumerate castes during their ten-year census and meticulously codified the system. Between 1860 and 1920, the British incorporated the caste system into their system of governance, granting administrative jobs and senior appointments only to the upper castes.

===== Targeting criminal castes and their isolation =====
Starting with the 19th century, the British colonial government passed a series of laws that applied to Indians based on their religion and caste identification. These colonial era laws and their provisions used the term "Tribes", which included castes within their scope. This terminology was preferred for various reasons, including Muslim sensitivities that considered castes by definition Hindu, and preferred Tribes, a more generic term that included Muslims.

The British colonial government, for instance, enacted the Criminal Tribes Act of 1871. This law declared that all those who belonged to certain castes were born with criminal tendencies. Ramnarayan Rawat, a professor of History and specialising in social exclusion in the Indian subcontinent, states that the criminal-by-birth castes under this Act included initially Ahirs, Gurjars and Jats, but its enforcement expanded by the late 19th century to include most Shudras and untouchables, such as Chamars, as well as Sannyasis and hill tribes. Castes suspected of rebelling against colonial laws and seeking self-rule for India, such as the previously ruling families Kallars and the Maravars in south India and non-loyal castes in north India such as Ahirs, Gurjars and Jats, were called "predatory and barbarian" and added to the criminal castes list. Some caste groups were targeted using the Criminal Tribes Act even when there were no reports of any violence or criminal activity, but where their forefathers were known to have rebelled against Mughal or British authorities, or these castes were demanding labour rights and disrupting colonial tax collecting authorities.

The colonial government prepared a list of criminal castes, and all members registered in these castes by caste-census were restricted in terms of regions they could visit, move about in or people with whom they could socialise. In certain regions of colonial India, entire caste groups were presumed guilty by birth, arrested, children separated from their parents, and held in penal colonies or quarantined without conviction or due process. This practice became controversial and did not enjoy the support of all British colonial officials. In a few cases this decades-long practice was reversed at the start of the 20th century with the proclamation that people "could not be incarcerated indefinitely on the presumption of [inherited] bad character". The criminal-by-birth laws against targeted castes was enforced until the mid-20th century, with an expansion of criminal castes list in west and south India through the 1900s to 1930s. Hundreds of Hindu communities were brought under the Criminal Tribes Act. By 1931, the colonial government included 237 criminal castes and tribes under the act in the Madras Presidency alone.

While the notion of hereditary criminals conformed to orientalist stereotypes and the prevailing racial theories during the colonial era, the social impact of its enforcement was profiling, division and isolation of many communities of Hindus as criminals-by-birth. (Note: Karade states, "the caste quarantine list was abolished by independent India in 1947 and criminal tribes law was formally repealed in 1952 by its first parliament".)

===== Religion and caste segregated human rights =====
Eleanor Nesbitt, a professor of History and Religions in India, states that the colonial government hardened the caste-driven divisions in India not only through its caste census, but with a series of laws in the early 20th century. Colonial officials, for instance, enacted laws such as the Land Alienation Act in 1900 and Punjab Pre-Emption Act in 1913, listing castes that could legally own land and denying equivalent property rights to other census-determined castes. These acts prohibited the inter-generational and intra-generational transfer of land from land-owning castes to any non-agricultural castes, thereby preventing economic mobility of property and creating consequent caste barriers in India.

Khushwant Singh, a Sikh historian, and Tony Ballantyne, a professor of history, state that these colonial-era laws helped create and erect barriers within land-owning and landless castes in northwest India. Caste-based discrimination and denial of human rights by the colonial state had similar impact elsewhere in India.

===== Social identity =====
Nicholas Dirks has argued that Indian caste as we know it today is a "modern phenomenon", (Note: Dirks (2001a, p. 5): "Rather, I will argue that caste (again, as we know it today) is a modern phenomenon, that it is, specifically, the product of an historical encounter between India and Western colonial rule. By this I do not mean to imply that it was simply invented by the too clever British, now credited with so many imperial patents that what began as colonial critique has turned into another form of imperial adulation. But I am suggesting that it was under the British that 'caste' became a single term capable of expressing, organising, and above all 'systematising' India's diverse forms of social identity, community, and organisation. This was achieved through an identifiable (if contested) ideological canon as the result of a concrete encounter with colonial modernity during two hundred years of British domination. In short, colonialism made caste what it is today.") as caste was "fundamentally transformed by British colonial rule". (Note: Dirks, Scandal of Empire (2006, p. 27): "The institution of caste, for example, a social formation that has been seen as not only basic to India but part of its ancient constitution, was fundamentally transformed by British colonial rule.") According to Dirks, before colonial rule, caste affiliation was quite loose and fluid, but colonial rule enforced caste affiliation rigorously, and constructed a much more strict hierarchy than existed previously, with some castes being criminalised and others being given preferential treatment.

De Zwart notes that the caste system used to be thought of as an ancient fact of Hindu life, but that contemporary scholars argue instead that the system was constructed by the colonial authorities. He says that "jobs and education opportunities were allotted based on caste, and people rallied and adopted a caste system that maximized their opportunity". De Zwart also notes that post-colonial affirmative action only reinforced the "British colonial project that ex hypothesi constructed the caste system".

Sweetman notes that the European conception of caste dismissed former political configurations and insisted upon an "essentially religious character" of India. During the colonial period, caste was defined as a religious system and was divorced from political powers. This made it possible for the colonial rulers to portray India as a society characterised by spiritual harmony in contrast to the former Indian states which they criticised as "despotic and epiphenomenal", (Note: Sweetman cites Dirks (1993), The Hollow Crown, University of Michigan Press, p.xxvii) with the colonial powers providing the necessary "benevolent, paternalistic rule by a more 'advanced' nation".

==== Further development ====
Assumptions about the caste system in Indian society, along with its nature, evolved during colonial rule. (Note: For example, some Britons believed Indians would shun train travel because tradition-bound South Asians were too caught up in caste and religion, and that they would not sit or stand in the same coaches out of concern for close proximity to a member of higher or lower or shunned caste. After the launch of train services, Indians of all castes, classes and gender enthusiastically adopted train travel without any concern for so-called caste stereotypes.) Corbridge concludes that British policies towards India's numerous princely sovereign states, as well as enumeration of the population into rigid categories during the 10-year census, particularly with the 1901 and 1911 census, contributed towards the hardening of caste identities.

Social unrest during 1920s led to a change in this policy. From then on, the colonial administration began a policy of positive discrimination by reserving a certain percentage of government jobs for the lower castes.

In the round table conference held in August 1932, upon the request of Ambedkar, the then Prime Minister of Britain, Ramsay MacDonald made a Communal Award which awarded a provision for separate representation for the Muslims, Sikhs, Christians, Anglo-Indians, Europeans and Dalits. These depressed classes were assigned a number of seats to be filled by election from special constituencies in which voters belonging to the depressed classes only could vote. Gandhi went on a hunger strike against this provision claiming that such an arrangement would split the Hindu community into two groups. Years later, Ambedkar wrote that Gandhi's fast was a form of coercion. This agreement, which saw Gandhi end his hunger strike and Ambedkar drop his demand for a separate electorate, was called the Poona Pact.

After India achieved independence, the policy of caste-based reservation of jobs was formalised with lists of Scheduled Castes and Scheduled Tribes.

==== Other theories and observations ====
Smelser and Lipset propose in their review of Hutton's study of caste system in colonial India the theory that individual mobility across caste lines may have been minimal in India because it was ritualistic. They state that this may be because the colonial social stratification worked with the pre-existing ritual caste system.

The emergence of a caste system in the modern form, during the early period of British colonial rule in the 18th and 19th centuries, was not uniform in South Asia. Claude Markovits, a French historian of colonial India, writes that Hindu society in north and west India (Sindh), in the late 18th century and much of the 19th century, lacked a proper caste system, their religious identities were fluid (a combination of Saivism, Vaisnavism, Sikhism), and the Brahmins were not the widespread priestly group (but the Bawas were). Markovits writes, "if religion was not a structuring factor, neither was caste" among the Hindu merchants group of northwest India.

=== Contemporary India ===
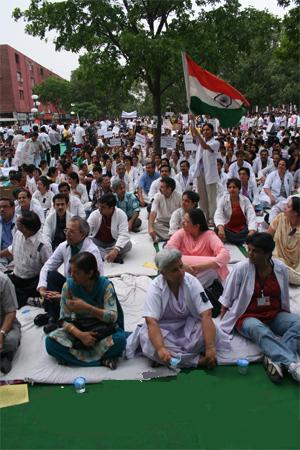
The massive 2006 Indian anti-reservation protests

==== Caste politics ====
Societal stratification, and the inequality that comes with it, still exists in India, and has been thoroughly criticised. Government policies aim at reducing this inequality by reservation – a quota system benefitting backward classes. The Indian government officially recognises historically discriminated communities of India such as the untouchables under the designation of Scheduled Castes, and certain economically backward castes as Other Backward Class.

Some, such as sociologist Arvind Shah, have argued that reservation paradoxically creates an incentive to perpetuate social stratification. Others, however, maintain that reservation on the basis of caste is necessary in order to prevent the monopolization of public sector jobs by members of the upper castes. These individuals also point out that reservation in India is not aimed primarily at eradicating poverty, but at ensuring adequate representation of all caste groups.

==== Marriage ====
A majority of marriages in India are still endogamous; intercaste and interreligious marriages are found mostly among those who are "economically, educationally, culturally advanced and urban oriented". A study in 2005 found that inter-caste marriages had nearly doubled between 1981 and 2005, reaching a level of 6.1%.

Opposition to intercaste marriage remains widespread, with Pew polling indicating that over 3 in 5 Indians agree that it is "very important" to stop both men and women from marrying outside of their castes. The polling indicated, furthermore, that Christians and Buddhists were relatively more accepting of intercaste marriages compared to Hindus, Muslims, and Sikhs. Honour killings related to disapproval of intercaste marriages remain frequent, with Outlook India noting, "Evidence, an NGO, revealed in November 2019 that as many as 195 known cases of honour killings were reported from Tamil Nadu alone in the past five years."

The Government of India provides financial incentives to intercaste couples under the Dr. Ambedkar Scheme for Social Integration through Inter-Caste Marriages. Various state governments such as those of Odisha, Haryana, Punjab, Karnataka, Himachal Pradesh, Bihar, Tamil Nadu, Rajasthan, and Maharashtra also have similar schemes.

==== Caste-related violence ====
Independent India has witnessed caste-related violence. According to a 2005 UN report, approximately 31,440 cases of violent acts committed against Dalits were reported in 1996. The UN report claimed 1.33 cases of violent acts per 10,000 Dalit people. For context, the UN reported between 40 and 55 cases of violent acts per 10,000 people in developed countries in 2005. One example of such violence is the Khairlanji massacre of 2006.

The Scheduled Caste and Scheduled Tribe (Prevention of Atrocities) Act, 1989 of India aims to prevent and punish atrocities and discrimination against members of the Scheduled Castes and Scheduled Tribes. Examples of crimes punishable under the Act include "forcing victims to eat or drink obnoxious substances; dumping excreta, sewage, carcasses into their homes or compounds; land grabbing; humiliation; sexual abuse". The National Crime Records Bureau includes statistics of crimes reported under the law as part of it annual reports. There has been a growth in total number of crimes reported under the Act in recent years but conviction rates have been low. Crimes against members of Scheduled Caste communities grew by 7.3% and against Scheduled Tribes by 26.5% in 2019.

=== Indian diaspora ===
The caste system persists within the Indian diaspora, with studies in the United States and the United Kingdom documenting caste-based practices and discrimination in social relationships, marriage, and employment.

In the United States, Dalits have reported experiencing both discrimination and violence. In 2020 the California Civil Rights Department initiated a lawsuit against Cisco and two of its engineers for alleged caste discrimination, but withdrew the case against the engineers three years later. It continued to proceed against Cisco. Observers claimed that the case was flawed and the engineers were targeted. City and State governments attempted to legislate against caste discrimination, with the city of Seattle being the first to do so. The State of California passed a bill in the Senate, only to be vetoed by the Governor.

The Government of the United Kingdom ran a public consultation on ways to ensure legal protection against caste discrimination in 2017 and decided to rely on the "emerging case law as developed by courts and tribunals".

== Affirmative action ==
Article 15 of the Constitution of India prohibits discrimination based on caste and Article 17 declared the practice of untouchability to be illegal. In 1955, India enacted the Untouchability (Offences) Act (renamed in 1976, as the Protection of Civil Rights Act). It extended the reach of law, from intent to mandatory enforcement. The Scheduled Castes and Scheduled Tribes (Prevention of Atrocities) Act was passed in India in 1989.

- The National Commission for Scheduled Castes and Scheduled Tribes was established to investigate, monitor, advise, and evaluate the socio-economic progress of the Scheduled Castes and Scheduled Tribes.
- A reservation system for people classified as Scheduled Castes and Scheduled Tribes has existed for over 50 years. The presence of privately owned free market corporations in India is limited and public sector jobs have dominated the percentage of jobs in its economy. A 2000 report estimated that most jobs in India were in companies owned by the government or agencies of the government. The reservation system implemented by India over 50 years, has been partly successful, because of all jobs, nationwide, in 1995, 17.2 percent of the jobs were held by those in the lowest castes.
- The Indian government classifies government jobs in four groups. The Group A jobs are senior most, high paying positions in the government, while Group D are junior most, lowest paying positions. In Group D jobs, the percentage of positions held by lowest caste classified people is 30% greater than their demographic percentage. In all jobs classified as Group C positions, the percentage of jobs held by lowest caste people is about the same as their demographic population distribution. In Group A and B jobs, the percentage of positions held by lowest caste classified people is 30% lower than their demographic percentage.
- The presence of lowest caste people in highest paying, senior-most position jobs in India has increased by ten-fold, from 1.18 percent of all jobs in 1959 to 10.12 percent of all jobs in 1995.

=== Recognition ===
The Indian government officially recognises historically discriminated communities of India such as the untouchables under the designation of Scheduled Castes and Scheduled Tribes, and certain economically backward Shudra castes as Other Backward Class. The Scheduled Castes are sometimes referred to as Dalit in contemporary literature. In 2001, Dalits comprised 16.2 percent of India's total population. Of the one billion Hindus in India, it is estimated that Hindu Forward caste comprises 26%, Other Backward Class comprises 43%, Hindu Scheduled Castes (Dalits) comprises 22% and Hindu Scheduled Tribes (Adivasis) comprises 9%.

In addition to taking affirmative action for people of scheduled castes and scheduled tribes, India has expanded its effort to include people from poor, backward castes in its economic and social mainstream. In 1990, the government reservation of 27% for Backward Classes on the basis of the Mandal Commission's recommendations. Since then, India has reserved 27 percent of job opportunities in government-owned enterprises and agencies for Socially and Educationally Backward Classes (SEBCs). The 27 percent reservation is in addition to 22.5 percent set aside for India's lowest castes for the last 50 years.

=== Mandal commission ===
The Mandal Commission was established in 1979 to "identify the socially or educationally backward" and to consider the question of seat reservations and quotas for people to redress caste discrimination. In 1980, the commission's report affirmed the affirmative action practice under Indian law, whereby additional members of lower castes—the other backward classes—were given exclusive access to another 27 percent of government jobs and slots in public universities, in addition to the 23 percent already reserved for the Dalits and Tribals. When V. P. Singh's administration tried to implement the recommendations of the Mandal Commission in 1990, massive protests were held in the country. Many alleged that the politicians were trying to cash in on caste-based reservations for purely pragmatic electoral purposes.

=== Other Backward Classes (OBC) ===
There is substantial debate over the exact number of OBCs in India; it is generally estimated to be sizable, but many believe that it is lower than the figures quoted by either the Mandal Commission or the National Sample Survey.

The reservation system has led to widespread protests, such as the 2006 Indian anti-reservation protests, with many complaining of reverse discrimination against the Forward Castes (the castes that do not qualify for the reservation).

In May 2011, the government approved a poverty, religion and caste census to identify poverty in different social backgrounds. The census would also help the government to re-examine and possibly undo some of the policies which were formed in haste such as the Mandal Commission in order to bring more objectivity to the policies with respect to contemporary realities. Critics of the reservation system believe that there is actually no social stigma at all associated with belonging to a backward caste and that because of the huge constitutional incentives in the form of educational and job reservations, a large number of people will falsely identify with a backward caste to receive the benefits. This would not only result in a marked inflation of the backward castes' numbers, but also lead to enormous administrative and judicial resources being devoted to social unrest and litigation when such dubious caste declarations are challenged.

In 20th century India, the upper-class (Ashraf) Muslims dominated the government jobs and parliamentary representation. As a result, there have been campaigns to include the Muslim untouchable and lower castes among the groups eligible for affirmative action in India under SC and STs provision act and have been given additional reservation based on the Sachar Committee report.

=== Effects of government aid ===
In a 2008 study, Desai et al. focussed on education attainments of children and young adults aged 6–29, from lowest caste and tribal populations of India. They completed a national survey of over 100,000 households for each of the four survey years between 1983 and 2000. They found a significant increase in lower caste children in their odds of completing primary school. The number of Dalit children who completed either middle-, high- or college-level education increased three times faster than the national average, and the total number were statistically same for both lower and upper castes. However, the same study found that in 2000, the percentage of Dalit males never enrolled in a school was still more than twice the percentage of upper caste males never enrolled in schools. Moreover, only 1.67% of Dalit females were college graduates compared to 9.09% of upper caste females. The number of Dalit girls in India who attended school doubled in the same period, but was still lower than the national average. Other poor caste groups as well as ethnic groups such as Muslims in India have also made improvements over the 16-year period, but their improvement lagged behind that of Dalits and Adivasis. The net percentage school attainment for Dalits and Muslims were statistically the same in 1999.

A 2007 nationwide survey of India by the World Bank found that over 80 percent of children of historically discriminated castes were attending schools. The fastest increase in school attendance by Dalit community children occurred during the recent periods of India's economic growth.

A study by Darshan Singh presents data on health and other indicators of socio-economic change in India's historically discriminated castes. He claims:

- In 2001, the literacy rates in India's lowest castes was 55 percent, compared to a national average of 63 percent.
- The childhood vaccination levels in India's lowest castes was 40 percent in 2001, compared to a national average of 44 percent.
- Access to drinking water within household or near the household in India's lowest castes was 80 percent in 2001, compared to a national average of 83 percent.
- The poverty level in India's lowest castes dropped from 49 percent to 39 percent between 1995 and 2005, compared to a national average change from 35 to 27 percent.

The life expectancy of various caste groups in modern India has been raised; but the International Institute for Population Sciences report suggests that poverty, not caste, is the bigger differentiation in life expectancy in modern India.

== Influence on other religions ==
While identified with Hinduism, caste systems are found in other religions on the Indian subcontinent, including other religions such as Buddhists, Christians and Muslims.

=== Muslims ===
The caste system has been observed among Muslims in India. They practice endogamy, hypergamy, hereditary occupations, avoid social mixing and have been stratified. There is some controversy if these characteristics make them social groups or castes of Islam. Some scholars assert that the Muslim castes are not as acute in their discrimination as those of the Hindus, while critics assert that the discrimination in South Asian Muslim society is worse.

From the earliest days of Islam's arrival in South Asia, Arab, Persian and Afghan Muslims have been recognised as an upper caste. Some upper caste Hindus who converted to Islam became part of the governing groups, who along with these foreign groups came to be known as Ashrafs (or nobles). Below them are the middle caste Muslims called Ajlafs, and the lowest status Muslims of the Arzals. Anti-caste activists like Ambedkar called the Arzal caste among Muslims the equivalent of Hindu untouchables, as did the British ethnographer Herbert Hope Risley.

In Bengal, some Muslims refer to the social stratification within their society as qaum (or Quoms), a term that is found among Muslims elsewhere in India, as well as in Pakistan and Afghanistan. Qaums have patrilineal heredity, with ranked occupations and endogamy. Membership in a qaum is inherited by birth. Barth identifies the origin of the stratification from the historical segregation between pak (pure) and paleed (impure)—defined by the family's social or religious status, occupation and involvement in sexual crimes. There is history of skin color defining Pak/Paleed, but that does not have historical roots, and was adopted by outsiders through analogy with the Hindu Caste system.

Endogamy is very common in the form of arranged consanguineous marriages among Muslims in India and Pakistan. Malik states that the lack of religious sanction makes qaum a "quasi-caste", and something that is found in Islam outside South Asia as well.

=== Sikh ===
The Sikh literature mentions Varna as Varan, and Jati as Zat or Zat-biradari. Eleanor Nesbitt, a professor of Religion and author of books on Sikhism, states that the Varan is described as a class system, while Zat has some caste system features in Sikh literature. In theory, Sikh literature does not recognise caste hierarchy or differences, but, in practice, states Nesbitt, widespread endogamy practices among Sikhs have been prevalent in modern times, and poorer Sikhs of disadvantaged castes continue to gather in their own places of worship. Most Sikh families, writes Nesbitt, continue to check the caste of any prospective marriage partner for their children. She notes that all Gurus of Sikhs married within their Zat, and they did not condemn or break with the convention of endogamous marriages for their own children or Sikhs in general.

Although the Sikh Gurus criticised the hierarchy of the caste system, one does exist in Sikh community. According to Sunrinder S, Jodhka, Sikhs belonging to the landowning dominant castes have not shed all their prejudices against the Dalits. While Dalits would be allowed entry into the village gurudwaras they would not be permitted to cook or serve langar (the communal meal). Therefore, wherever they could mobilise resources, the Dalits of Punjab have tried to construct their own gurudwaras and other local level institutions in order to attain a certain degree of cultural autonomy.

In 1953, the Government of India acceded to the demands of the Sikh leader, Tara Singh, to include Sikh castes of the converted untouchables in the list of scheduled castes. In the Shiromani Gurdwara Parbandhak Committee, 20 of the 140 seats are reserved for low-caste Sikhs.

=== Jains ===
The caste system has existed in Jainism for centuries, primarily in terms of endogamy, although, per Paul Dundas, in modern times the system does not play a significant role. This is contradicted by Carrithers and Humphreys who describe the major Jain castes in Rajasthan with their social rank.

=== Christians ===
Social stratification is found among the Christians in India based on caste as well as by their denomination and location. The caste distinction is based on their caste at the time that they or their ancestors converted to Christianity. Since the 16th century, they typically do not intermarry, and sit separately during prayers in Church.

The earliest conception of caste among Indian Christians comes from Kerala, called Saint Thomas Christians (or "Syrian Christians"). Duncan Forrester observes that "Nowhere else in India is there a large and ancient Christian community which has in time immemorial been accorded a high status in the caste hierarchy. ... Syrian Christian community operates very much as a caste and is properly regarded as a caste or at least a very caste-like group." Amidst the Hindu society, the Saint Thomas Christians of Kerala had inserted themselves within the Indian caste society by the observance of caste rules and were regarded by the Hindus as a caste occupying a high place within their caste hierarchy. Their traditional belief that their ancestors were high-caste Hindus such as Nambudiris and Nairs, who were evangelised by St. Thomas, has also supported their upper-caste status. With the arrival of European missionaries and their evangelistic mission among the lower castes in Kerala, two new groups of Christians, the Latin Catholics of Malabar and Protestant Dalit Christians, were formed but they continued to be considered as lower castes by higher ranked communities, including the Saint Thomas Christians.

Table 1. Distribution of Population by Religion and Caste Categories
Religion/Caste	SCs	STs	OBCs	Forward Caste/Others
Hinduism	22.2%	9%	42.8%	26%
Islam	0.8%	0.5%	39.2%	59.5%
Christianity	9.0%	32.8%	24.8%	33.3%
Sikhism	30.7%	0.9%	22.4%	46.1%
Jainism	0.0%	2.6%	3.0%	94.3%
Buddhism	89.5%	7.4%	0.4%	2.7%
Zoroastrianism	0.0%	15.9%	13.7%	70.4%
Others	2.6%	82.5%	6.25	8.7%
Total	19.7%	8.5%	41.1%	30.8%

=== Distribution ===
Table 1 is the distribution of population of each Religion by Caste Categories, obtained from merged sample of Schedule 1 and Schedule 10 of available data from the National Sample Survey Organisation 55th (1999–2000) and 61st Rounds (2004–05) Round Survey. The Other Backward Class (OBCs) were found to comprise 52% of the country's population by the Mandal Commission report of 1980, a figure which had shrunk to 41% by 2006 when the National Sample Survey Organisation's survey took place.

== Criticism ==
There has been criticism of the caste system from both within and outside of India. Since the 1980s, caste has become a major controversy in the politics of India.

=== Indian social reformers ===
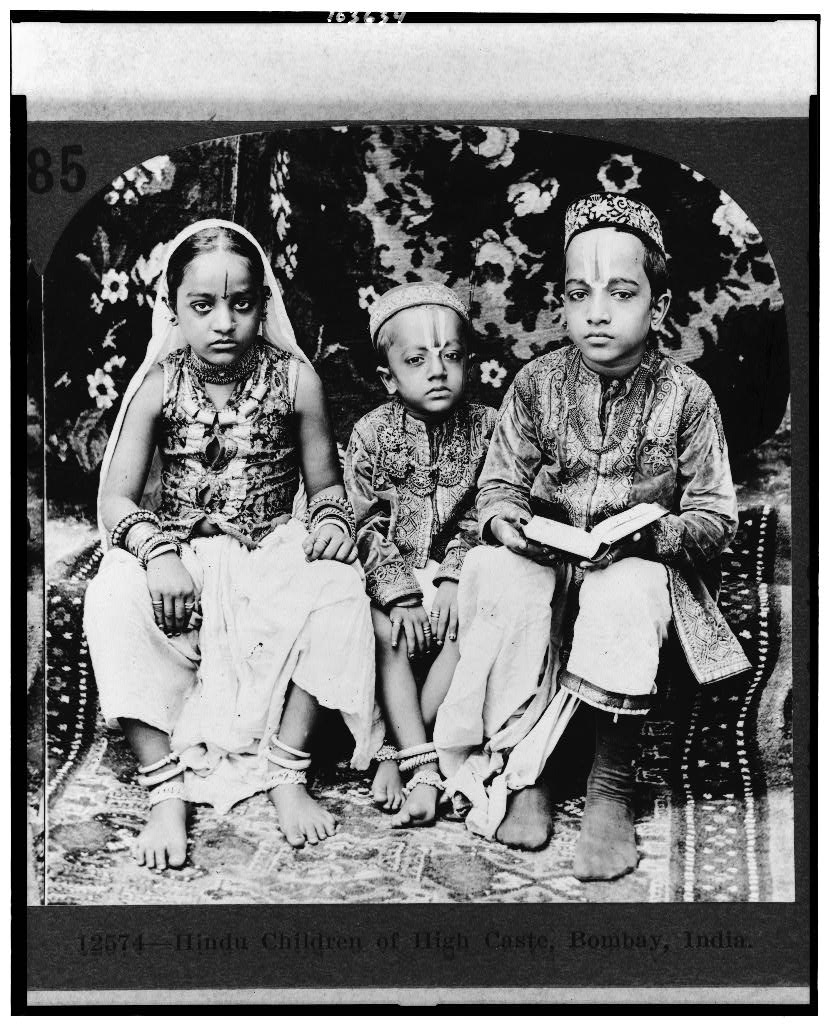
A 1922 stereograph of Hindu children of high caste, Bombay. This was part of Underwood & Underwood stereoscope journey of colonial world. This and related collections became controversial for staging extreme effects and constructing identities of various colonised nations. Christopher Pinney remarks such imaging was a part of surveillance and imposed identities upon Indians that were resented.

The caste system has been criticised by many Indian social reformers.

==== Basava ====
Basava (1105–1167) championed devotional worship that rejected temple worship and rituals, and replaced it with personalised direct worship of Shiva through practices such as individually worn icons and symbols like a small linga. This approach brought Shiva's presence to everyone and at all times, without gender, class or caste discrimination. His teachings and verses such as Káyakavé Kailása (Work is the path to Kailash (bliss, heaven), or Work is Worship) became popular.

==== Jyotirao Phule ====
Jyotirao Phule (1827–1890) vehemently criticised any explanations that the caste system was natural and ordained by the Creator in Hindu texts. If Brahma wanted castes, argued Phule, he would have ordained the same for other creatures. There are no castes in species of animals or birds, so why should there be one among human animals. In his criticism Phule added, "Brahmins cannot claim superior status because of caste, because they hardly bothered with these when wining and dining with Europeans." Professions did not make castes, and castes did not decide one's profession. If someone does a job that is dirty, it does not make them inferior; in the same way that no mother is inferior because she cleans the excreta of her baby. Ritual occupation or tasks, argued Phule, do not make any human being superior or inferior.

==== Vivekananda ====
Vivekananda similarly criticised caste as one of the many human institutions that bars the power of free thought and action of an individual. Caste or no caste, creed or no creed, any man, or class, or caste, or nation, or institution that bars the power of free thought and bars action of an individual is devilish, and must go down. Liberty of thought and action, asserted Vivekananda, is the only condition of life, of growth and of well-being.

==== B. R. Ambedkar ====
B. R. Ambedkar, who was born in a caste classified as untouchable, became a leader of human rights campaigns in India, a prolific writer, and a key person in drafting modern India's constitution in the 1940s. He wrote extensively on discrimination, trauma and what he saw as the tragic effects of the caste system in India. He believed that the caste system originated in the practice of endogamy and that it spread through imitation by other groups. He wrote that initially, Brahmins, Kshatriyas, Vaishyas and Shudras existed as classes whose choice of occupation was not restricted by birth and in which exogamy was prevalent. Brahmins then began to practise endogamy and enclosed themselves, hence Ambedkar defines caste as "enclosed class". He believed that traditions such as sati, enforced widowhood and child marriage developed from the need to reinforce endogamy and Shastras were used to glorify these practices so that they are observed without being questioned. Later, other caste groups imitated these customs. However, although Ambedkar uses the approach of psychologist Gabriel Tarde to indicate how the caste system spread, he also explains that Brahmins or Manu cannot be blamed for the origin of the caste system and discredits theories that trace the origin of the caste system in races.

== Caste politics ==
Political parties in India have indulged in caste-based votebank politics. Parties including Bahujan Samaj Party (BSP), the Samajwadi Party and the Janata Dal claim to represent the backward castes, and rely on OBC support, often in alliance with Dalit and Muslim support, to win elections. The Hindu right has courted controversy over its own caste-based appeals, for example in 2020 when BJP MP (Member of Parliament) Pragya Singh Thakur came under fire for comments she made about Shudras during an address to a caste body called the 'Kshatriya Mahasabha'.

== Economic inequality ==
A 1995 study notes that the caste system in India is a system of exploitation of poor low-ranking groups by more prosperous high-ranking groups. A report published in 2001 note that in India 36.3% of people own no land at all, 60.6% own about 15% of the land, with a very wealthy 3.1% owning 15% of the land. Haque also reports that over 90 percent of both scheduled castes (low-ranking groups) and all other castes (high-ranking groups) either do not own land or own land area capable of producing less than $1000 per year of food and income per household. However, over 99 percent of India's farms are less than 10 hectares, and 99.9 percent of the farms are less than 20 hectares, regardless of the farmer or landowner's caste. Indian government has, in addition, vigorously pursued agricultural land ceiling laws which prohibit anyone from owning land greater than mandated limits. India has used this law to forcibly acquire land from some, then redistribute tens of millions of acres to the landless and poor of the low-caste. Haque suggests that Indian lawmakers need to reform and modernise the nation's land laws and rely less on blind adherence to land ceilings and tenancy reform.

In a 2011 study, Aiyar also notes that such qualitative theories of economic exploitation and consequent land redistribution within India between 1950 and 1990 had no effect on the quality of life and poverty reduction. Instead, economic reforms since the 1990s and resultant opportunities for non-agricultural jobs have reduced poverty and increased per capita income for all segments of Indian society. For specific evidence, Aiyar mentions the following:

Critics believe that the economic liberalisation has benefited just a small elite and left behind the poor, especially the lowest Hindu caste of dalits. But a recent authoritative survey revealed striking improvements in living standards of dalits in the last two decades. Television ownership was up from zero to 45 percent; cellphone ownership up from zero to 36 percent; two-wheeler ownership (of motorcycles, scooters, mopeds) up from zero to 12.3 percent; children eating yesterday's leftovers down from 95.9 percent to 16.2 percent ... Dalits running their own businesses up from 6 percent to 37 percent; and proportion working as agricultural labourers down from 46.1 percent to 20.5 percent.

Cassan has studied the differential effect within two segments of India's Dalit community. He finds India's overall economic growth has produced the fastest and more significant socio-economic changes. Cassan further concludes that legal and social program initiatives are no longer India's primary constraint in further advancement of India's historically discriminated castes; further advancement are likely to come from improvements in the supply of quality schools in rural and urban India, along with India's economic growth.

== Apartheid and discrimination ==
The maltreatment of Dalits in India has been described by Anand Teltumbde, Gopal Guru and others as "India's hidden apartheid". Critics of the accusations point to substantial improvements in the position of Dalits in post-independence India, consequent to the strict implementation of the rights and privileges enshrined in the Constitution of India, as implemented by the Protection of Civil rights Act, 1955. They also argue that the practice has disappeared in urban public life.

Recent research by Naveen Bharathi, Deepak Malghan and Andaleeb Rahman found that "the extent of intra-village segregation in Karnataka is greater than the local black-white segregation in the American South that continues to influence residential patterns to this day". They claim that this finding agrees with previous ethnographic research that found that residential space in rural India is segregated along caste lines.

An investigation by The Wire and the Pulitzer Center on Crisis Reporting found that the prison manuals in multiple states had not been updated since the British Raj and were being used to enforce a caste-based segregation of labour within prisons. The Supreme Court of India ruled in October 2024 that such practices were a violation of Article 15 of the Constitution of India. It took note of specific rules in prison manuals of several states that enable such practices and struck them down.

Sociologists Kevin Reilly, Stephen Kaufman and Angela Bodino, while critical of caste system, conclude that modern India does not practice apartheid since there is no state-sanctioned discrimination. They write that casteism in India is presently "not apartheid. In fact, untouchables, as well as tribal people and members of the lowest castes in India benefit from broad affirmative action programmes and are enjoying greater political power."

== In popular culture ==
=== In literature ===
Mulk Raj Anand's debut novel, Untouchable (1935), is based on the theme of untouchability. The debut novel of Arundhati Roy, The God of Small Things (1997), also has themes surrounding the caste system across religions. A lawyer named Sabu Thomas filed a petition to have the book published without the last chapter, which had graphic description of sexual acts between members of different castes. Thomas claimed the alleged obscenity in the last chapter deeply hurts the Syrian Christian community, the basis of the novel.

=== In film ===
The Hindi film Achhut Kannya (Untouchable Maiden, 1936), starring Ashok Kumar and Devika Rani, was an early reformist film. Since then, there are a variety of films focusing on caste discrimination and the depiction of inter-caste relations, such as Sujata (1959) and Ankur (1974). The largest swell of caste-focused films with lower-caste representation occurred from the 1960s until 1990, during the peak of parallel cinema. However, since the 1990s, there is a substantial disparity in caste representation in film due to the rise of upper-caste protagonists, casting, and participation in the industry. This can be traced to the beginning of the film industry, which was pioneered by a Brahmin, Dadasaheb Phalke; since then, while Dalits tried to enter the industry, they were often cast in side roles or as villains.

In the 21st century, there are several critically acclaimed regional films known for strong caste representation. Sairat (2016) and Fandry (2013) are both Marathi-language films about inter-caste romance and discrimination and are respected for their Dalit direction and honest depiction of lower-caste experiences. Pariyerum Perumal (2018) is a Tamil film on caste violence, and Kabali (2016) is an action film starring Rajinikanth, both directed by Dalit filmmaker Pa. Ranjith.

Unlike regional films, Hindi films are still dominated by upper-caste filmmakers and stories, even when they attempt to discuss caste discrimination. Article 15 (2019) is a crime thriller that stars a Brahmin hero who helps Dalit villagers by investigating the murder of two Dalit girls, and works to erase caste discrimination in the police system. It was a box-office hit but is criticized for its upper-caste casting and victimization of Dalits.

== See also ==
- Aggañña Sutta
- Article 15
- Inter-caste marriages in India
- Balinese caste system
- Caste systems in Africa
- Caste system in Sri Lanka
- Caste discrimination in the United States
- Manual scavenging – a caste-based activity in India, officially abolished but still ongoing
- Social class in Cambodia
- Gadjo
- Caste Census

== Sources ==
- Bamshad, Michael; Kivisild, Toomas; Watkins, W. Scott; Dixon, Mary E.; Ricker, Chris E.; Rao, Baskara B.; Naidu, J. Mastan; Prasad, B.V. Ravi; Reddy, P. Govinda; Rasanayagam, Arani; Papiha, Surinder S.; Villems, Richard; Redd, Alan J.; Hammer, Michael F.; Nguyen, Son V. (June 2001). "Genetic Evidence on the Origins of Indian Caste Populations". Genome Research. 11 (6): 994–1004. doi:10.1101/gr.173301. hdl:1808/16276. ISSN 1088-9051. PMC 311057. PMID 11381027.
- Basham, Arthur L. (1954). The Wonder That Was India: A Survey of the Culture of the Indian Sub-Continent before the Coming of the Muslims. Grove Press.
- Basu, A.; Sarkar-Roy, N.; Majumder, P.P. (February 2016). "Genomic reconstruction of the history of extant populations of India reveals five distinct ancestral components and a complex structure". Proceedings of the National Academy of Sciences of the United States of America. 113 (6): 1594–1599. Bibcode:2016PNAS..113.1594B. doi:10.1073/pnas.1513197113. PMC 4760789. PMID 26811443.
- Bayly, Susan (2001). Caste, Society and Politics in India from the Eighteenth Century to the Modern Age. Cambridge University Press. ISBN 978-0-521-26434-1.
- Bayly, Susan (2004), Saints, Goddesses and Kings: Muslims and Christians in South Indian Society, Cambridge University Press, ISBN 978-0-521-89103-5
- Béteille, André (March 1996), "Varna and jati" (PDF), Sociological Bulletin, 45 (1): 15–27, doi:10.1177/0038022919960102, JSTOR 23619694, S2CID 147984688, archived from the original (PDF) on 11 February 2020
- Beteille, Andre (3 October 2001), "Race and Caste", The Hindu, archived from the original on 13 March 2014
- Bose, Pradip (1996). Momin, A .R. (ed.). The legacy of G.S. Ghurye: a centennial festschrift. Popular. ISBN 978-81-7154-831-6.
- Bronkhorst, Johannes (2020). "Plagues and Brahmins: Did a Combination of Epidemics and Ideology Empty India's Cities?". In Lindegaard Knudsen, Toke; Schmidt-Madsen, Jacob; Speyer, Sara (eds.). Body and Cosmos: Studies in Early Indian Medical and Astral Sciences in Honor of Kenneth G. Zysk. BRILL.
- Bronkhorst, Johannes (2020a). "India's Past Reconsidered". In Kroll, Paul W.; Silk, Jonathan A. (eds.). "At the Shores of the Sky": Asian Studies for Albert Hofstadt. BRILL.
- Cohen, Stephen P. (2001), India: Emerging Power, Brookings Institution Press, ISBN 978-0-8157-9839-2
- Chakravarti, Uma (2 March 1985), "Towards a Historical Sociology of Stratification in Ancient India: Evidence from Buddhist Sources", Economic and Political Weekly, 20 (9): 356–360, JSTOR 4374135
- Chakravarti, Uma (2003), Gendering Caste Through a Feminist Lens, Popular Prakashan, ISBN 978-81-85604-54-1
- Chapman, Graham (1993), "Religious vs. Regional Determinism India, Pakistan and Bangladesh as Inheritors of Empire", in Arnold, David; Robb, Peter (eds.), Institutions and Ideologies: A SOAS South Asia Reader, Curzon Press, ISBN 978-0-7007-0284-8
- Chaudhary, Nandita; Anandalakshmy, S.; Valsiner, Jaan (2013), Cultural Realities of Being: Abstract Ideas Within Everyday Lives, Routledge, ISBN 978-1-134-74349-0
- Corbridge, Stuart; Harriss, John; Jeffrey, Craig (2013), India Today: Economy, Politics and Society, John Wiley & Sons, ISBN 978-0-7456-6535-1
- Corbridge, Stuart; Harriss, John (2000), Reinventing India: Liberalization, Hindu Nationalism and Popular Democracy, Polity Press
- de Zwart, Frank (July 2000), "The Logic of Affirmative Action: Caste, Class and Quotas in India", Acta Sociologica, 43 (3): 235–249, doi:10.1177/000169930004300304, JSTOR 4201209, S2CID 220432103
- Dirks, Nicholas B. (2001a), Castes of Mind: Colonialism and the Making of New India, Princeton University Press, ISBN 978-0-691-08895-2
- Dirks, Nicholas B. (2001b), "Discriminating Difference: The Postcolonial Politics of Caste in India", in Burguière, André; Grew, Raymond (eds.), The Construction of Minorities: Cases for Comparison Across Time and Around the World, University of Michigan Press, ISBN 978-0-472-06737-4
- Dirks, Nicholas B. (2006), The Scandal of Empire: India and the creation of imperial Britain, Harvard University Press, ISBN 978-0-674-03426-6
- Dumont, Louis (1980) [1966], Homo Hierarchicus: The Caste System and Its Implications (Reprint, revised ed.), University of Chicago Press, ISBN 978-0-226-16963-7
- Forrester, Duncan B. (1980), Caste and Christianity: Attitudes and Policies on Caste of Anglo-Saxon Protestant Missions in India, Curzon Press and Humanities Press
- Fowler, Jeaneane (1997), Hinduism: Beliefs and Practices, Sussex Academic Press, ISBN 978-1-898723-60-8
- Ghurye, G. S. (1969) [first published 1932]. Caste and Race in India (Fifth ed.). Popular Prakashan. ISBN 978-81-7154-205-5.
- Gupta, Dipankar (2000). Interrogating Caste: Understanding hierarchy & difference in Indian society. Penguin Books. ISBN 978-0-14-029706-5.
- Hiltebeitel, Alf (2011). Dharma: its early history in law, religion, and narrative. Oxford University Press. ISBN 978-0-19-539423-8.
- Inden, Ronald (2001), Imagining India, Indiana University Press, ISBN 978-0-253-21358-7
- Jaffrelot, Christophe (2006). "The Impact of Affirmative Action in India: More Political than Socioeconomic". India Review. 5 (2): 173–189. doi:10.1080/14736480600824516. S2CID 154413160.
- Juergensmeyer, Mark (2006). The Oxford Handbook of Global Religions. Oxford University Press. ISBN 978-0-19-972761-2.
- Masefield, Peter (1986). Divine revelation in Pali Buddhism. Routledge. pp. 148–151. ISBN 978-955-9028-02-4.
- Mendelsohn, Oliver; Vicziany, Maria (1998), The Untouchables, Subordination, Poverty and the State in Modern India, Cambridge University Press
- Midgley, James (2011). Colonialism and welfare: social policy and the British imperial legacy. United Kingdom: Edward Elgar. ISBN 978-0-85793-243-3.
- Moorjani P, Thangaraj K, Patterson N, Lipson M, Loh PR, Govindaraj P, et al. (September 2013). "Genetic evidence for recent population mixture in India". American Journal of Human Genetics. 93 (3): 422–438. doi:10.1016/j.ajhg.2013.07.006. PMC 3769933. PMID 23932107.
- Nakatsuka, Nathan; Moorjani, Priya; Rai, Niraj; Sarkar, Biswanath; Tandon, Arti; Patterson, Nick; SriLakshmi Bhavani, Gandham; Mohan Girisha, Katta; Mustak, Mohammed; Srinivasan, Sudha; Kaushik, Amit; Vahab, Saadi Abdul; Jagadeesh, Sujatha; Kapaettu Satyamoorthy, Kapaettu; Singh, Lalji; Reich, David; Thangaraj, Kumarasamy (July 2017). "The promise of discovering population-specific disease-associated genes in South Asia". Nature Genetics. 49 (9): 1402–1407. doi:10.1038/ng.3917. PMC 5675555. PMID 28714977.
- Narasimhan, Vagheesh M.; Patterson, N.J.; Moorjani, Priya; Rohland, Nadin; et al. (2019). "The Formation of Human Populations in South and Central Asia". Science. 365 (6457) eaat7487. Bibcode:2019Sci...365t7487N. doi:10.1126/science.aat7487. hdl:10278/3722735. PMC 6822619. PMID 31488661. Archived from the original on 29 December 2020.
- Olivelle, Patrick (2008). Chapter 9. Caste and Purity in Collected essays. Firenze, Italy: Firenze University Press. ISBN 978-88-8453-729-4.
- Orr, Leslie (2000). Donors, devotees, and daughters of God temple women in medieval Tamilnadu. Oxford University Press. ISBN 978-0-19-509962-1.
- Reich, David; Thangaraj, Kumarasamy; Patterson, Nick; Price, Alkes L.; Singh, Lalji (2009). "Reconstructing Indian Population History". Nature. 461 (7263): 489–494. Bibcode:2009Natur.461..489R. doi:10.1038/nature08365. PMC 2842210. PMID 19779445.
- Reich, David (2018), Who We Are and How We Got Here, Oxford University Press, ISBN 978-0-19-882125-0
- Robb, Peter (1997). The Concept of Race in South Asia (2nd ed.). Oxford University Press. ISBN 978-0-19-564268-1.
- Samuel, Geoffrey (2008). The Origins of Yoga and Tantra: Indic Religions to the Thirteenth Century. Cambridge University Press. ISBN 978-1-139-47021-6.
- Sathaye, Adheesh A. (17 April 2015). Crossing the Lines of Caste: Visvamitra and the Construction of Brahmin Power in Hindu Mythology. Oxford University Press. ISBN 978-0-19-027312-5.
- Sharma, Arvind (2000). Classical Hindu Thought: An Introduction. Oxford University Press. ISBN 978-0-19-564441-8.
- Sharma, R. S. (1958), Śūdras in Ancient India, Delhi: Motilal Banarasi Dass – via archive.org
  - Sharma, Ram Sharan (1990) [first published in 1958], Śūdras in Ancient India: A Social History of the Lower Order Down to Circa A.D. 600 (Third ed.), Motilal Banarsidass Publishers., ISBN 978-81-208-0706-8
- Silverberg, James (November 1969), "Social Mobility in the Caste System in India: An Interdisciplinary Symposium", The American Journal of Sociology, 75 (3): 443–444, JSTOR 2775721
- Smelser, Neil; Lipset, Seymour (2005), Social Structure & Mobility in Economic Development, Aldine Transaction, ISBN 978-0-202-30799-2
- Smith, Brian K. (2005), "Varna and Jati", in Jones, Lindsay (ed.), Encyclopedia of Religion (2nd ed.), MacMillan Reference US, ISBN 978-0-02-865734-9
- Srinivas, Mysore N. (1952), Religion and Society among the Coorgs of South India, Oxford
- St. John, Ian (2012), The Making of the Raj: India Under the East India Company, ABC-CLIO, ISBN 978-1-84645-014-3
- Stokes, Eric (February 1973), "The First Century of British Colonial Rule in India: Social Revolution or Social Stagnation?", Past and Present (58): 136–160, doi:10.1093/past/58.1.136, JSTOR 650259
- Stokes, Eric (1980), The Peasant and the Raj: Studies in Agrarian Society and Peasant Rebellion in Colonial India, Cambridge University Press, ISBN 978-0-521-29770-7
- Sweetman, Will (December 2004), "The prehistory of Orientalism: Colonialism and the Textual Basis for Bartholomaus Ziegenbalg's Account of Hinduism" (PDF), New Zealand Journal of Asian Studies, 6 (2): 12–38, archived from the original (PDF) on 7 February 2013
- Talbot, Cynthia (2001), Precolonial India in practice society, region, and identity in medieval Andhra, Oxford University Press, ISBN 978-0-19-513661-6
- Thapar, Romila (2004), Early India: From the Origins to AD 1300, University of California Press, ISBN 978-0-520-24225-8
- Trautmann, Thomas R. (1997), Aryans and British India, Vistaar
- Witzel, Michael (1995). "Early Sanskritization. Origins and Development of the Kuru State" (PDF). Electronic Journal of Vedic Studies (FTP). pp. 1–26. (To view documents see Help:FTP)
