= Ahar (disambiguation) =

Ahar is a city in East Azerbaijan Province, Iran

Ahar may also refer to:

- Ahar County, an administrative subdivision in East Azerbaijan Province, Iran
- Ahar, Tehran, a village in Tehran Province
- Ahar, Uttar Pradesh, a town in Uttar Pradesh, India
- Ahar, Rajasthan, a village in Rajasthan, India
- Ahar (caste), an Indian caste

== People with the surname ==
- Jimmy Anak Ahar (born 1981), Bruneian middle-distance runner
