= Nicholas Dirks =

American indologist, historian and former university administrator

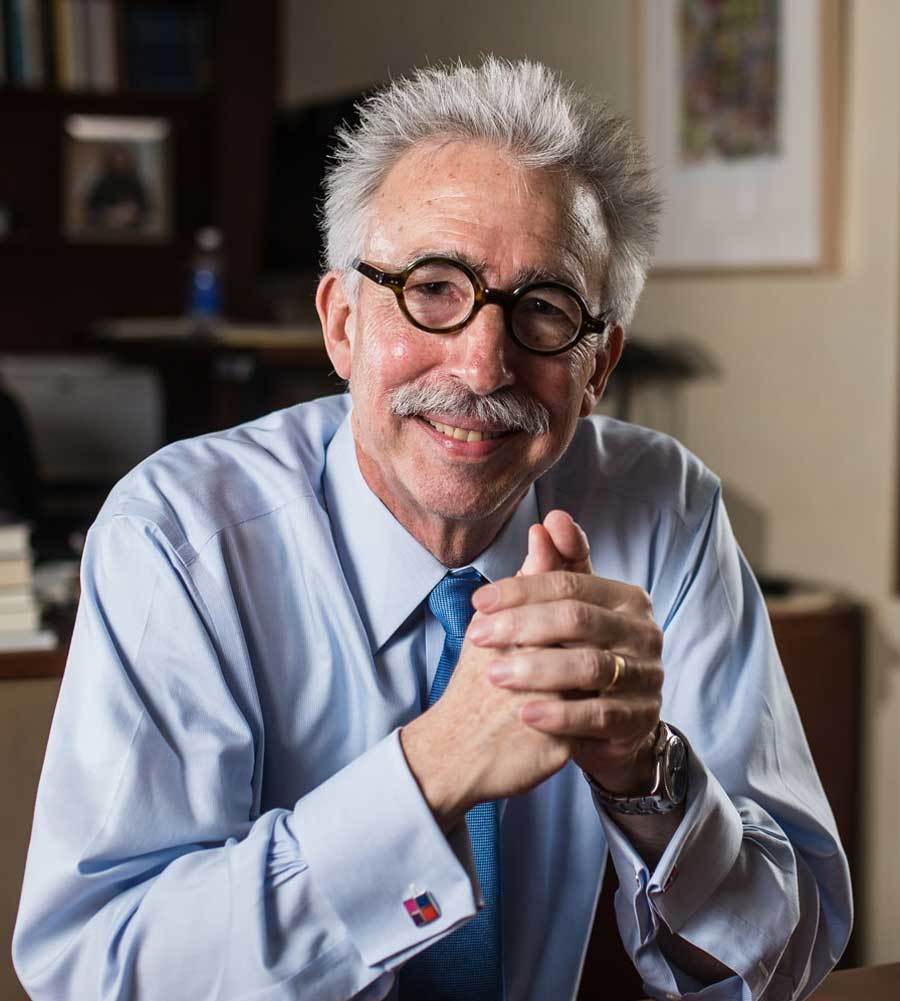
- Dirks in 2015

10th Chancellor of the University of California, Berkeley
- In office June 1, 2013 – June 30, 2017
- Preceded by: Robert J. Birgeneau
- Succeeded by: Carol T. Christ

Personal details
- Spouse: Janaki Bakhle
- Education: Wesleyan University (BA); University of Chicago (MA, PhD)

Academic background
- Thesis: Little kingdoms of South India: Political authority and social relations in the southern Tamil countryside (1981)
- Doctoral advisor: Bernard Cohn

Academic work
- Discipline: Historical anthropology
- Institutions: California Institute of Technology; University of Michigan; Columbia University; University of California, Berkeley
- Main interests: British colonial rule
- Notable works: The Scandal of Empire (2006)

Nicholas B. Dirks is an American academic and a former Chancellor of the University of California, Berkeley. Dirks is the author of numerous books on South Asian history and culture, primarily concerned with the impact of British colonial rule. In June 2020, Dirks was named president and CEO of The New York Academy of Sciences.

== Early life and education ==
Dirks was born in Illinois but grew up in New Haven, Connecticut, where his father, J. Edward Dirks, was a professor at Yale University. When the latter received a Fulbright Scholarship in 1963 to teach at the Madras Christian College, the Dirks family relocated to Madras, where Nicholas developed an interest in Indian culture. He completed his undergraduate education at Wesleyan University, where he received a B.A. in African and Asian studies in 1972. Thereafter, he attended the University of Chicago, where he earned an M.A. in history in 1974 and a Ph.D. in history and anthropology in 1981.

== Career ==
Dirks's career spans five decades and includes experience in higher education both as a member of the faculty as well as in administration, in addition to positions in the nonprofit sector.

Upon completing his PhD, Dirks joined the faculty at the California Institute of Technology as an assistant professor. There he taught an Introduction to Asian Civilization course for undergraduate students. He also returned to India to conduct fieldwork for what would become his first book, The Hollow Crown.

Dirks left Caltech for a faculty position at the University of Michigan in 1987 where he had the opportunity to teach graduate students for the first time. With joint appointments in history and anthropology, he worked with a colleague to develop an interdisciplinary PhD program combining the two disciplines. This work paved the way as Dirks eventually transitioned to university administration.

In 1997 Dirks left Michigan to chair the anthropology department at Columbia University, the oldest department of its kind in the United States. Under his leadership, the department recruited new faculty from Asia as well as Africa. Additionally, Dirks supported research in colonial and postcolonial studies. Dirks published his second book, Castes of Mind, in 2001.

In 2004, Dirks became a full-time administrator at Columbia, serving as Vice President, and later, Executive Vice President, of the Arts and Sciences and Dean of the Faculty. This enabled him "to promote interdisciplinary study across all of the liberal arts and sciences." In this role he oversaw six schools, 29 departments, and several special programs and labs. The Scandal of the Empire, Dirks's third book, was published in 2006.

Dirks left Columbia in 2013 to serve as chancellor of the University of California, Berkeley. He resigned from the chancellorship in 2017. He remains on faculty of the history department at Berkeley, an unpaid position that enables him to continue to teach and work for the university. From 2018 to 2020 Dirks was chancellor and vice-chairman of Whittle School & Studios, a global network of independent schools serving children from 3 to 18.

Dirks, who took over the leadership of The New York Academy of Sciences in 2020 and is the Franz Boas Professor Emeritus of Anthropology at Columbia, has held numerous prestigious fellowships and awards, including a Guggenheim Fellowship and a MacArthur Foundation residential fellowship at the Institute for Advanced Study in Princeton, NJ. He is a fellow of the American Academy of Arts and Sciences, and a Senior Member at the Council on Foreign Relations. Dirks also holds honorary degrees from universities in India and China.

== Works ==
=== The Hollow Crown ===
Published in his first faculty job at the California Institute of Technology, this involved fieldwork conducted in India.

The book was praised by Ian Copland, a history professor at Monash University, in a review in the Journal South Asia. Copland wrote, "Now and then a work of scholarship appears which forces one to take a hard look at the way things are perceived in our discipline. Such a book might break new ground, taking us into hitherto uncharted regions of Indian society; or it might with penetrating insights, reopen stale debates about the 'big' issues of structure and process; or it might, yet again, challenge existing modes of enquiry. Rarely, however, does one come across a book which does all three." Furthermore, the Journal of Interdisciplinary History stated, "No book reveals the vast terrain of scholarship that opens out from intersections of history, anthropology, and critical theory better than this one." This interdisciplinary approach would be a theme throughout Dirks' future research.

=== Castes of Mind ===
Castes of Mind, published in 2001, focuses on the ways in which the caste system changed under British colonial rule, and how it continued to change in the postcolonial era. It develops the theories of his doctoral adviser Bernard Cohn that the Indian caste system was significantly less rigid until taking on its present form under British rule and this affects current Indian politics.

=== Scandal of Empire ===
The Scandal of the Empire, Dirks's third book, was published in 2006. Michael Fisher, emeritus Robert S. Danforth Professor of History at Oberlin College, said of the book, "Dirks own extensive research and writing as a historian of India provide him with a perspective that enriches his rereading of the Empire's origin's in scandal and elucidates them for scholars and lay readers alike."

=== City of Intellect ===
In 2023, Dirks published City of Intellect: The Uses and Abuses of the University, "part autobiography, part practical manifesto" on his life and career in academia. In a book review for the Wall Street Journal, Indiana University professor emeritus Leslie Lenkowsky wrote "[Dirks] laments that failures of governance and mission 'have led so many to lose faith, trust, and confidence in the world of higher education.'" Lenkowsky concluded "Anyone wanting to understand why even the best American universities are in such a state will learn a lot by reading the reflections of [Dirks] even if solutions remain elusive." A review in Inside Higher Ed called it "a rich, accessible and eloquent examination of what it will take for public higher education to live up to its democratic promise." The review's author, University of Texas at Austin historian Steven Mintz, continued "I found it deeply moving, even wrenching at times....I have read many recent autobiographical accounts by senior academic administrators, and Dirks's is the most honest, incisive and personally revealing."

== Berkeley Chancellorship ==
During his tenure, Dirks aspired to enhance the undergraduate experience, including the formation of a new undergraduate residential college, the creation of an undergraduate program in data science, the formation of a task force examining student housing, and efforts to improve the experiences of intercollegiate athletes at Berkeley. Dirks spearheaded new interdisciplinary programs including the Berkeley Arts + Design Initiative, and regional multi-institution research efforts such as the Chan-Zuckerberg Initiative, and global research and exchange partnerships.

Dirks convened a special committee in 2016 to review and make recommendations for improving campus services, policies and practices related to sexual violence, harassment and assault against students, staff and faculty that resulted in a major review of all campus procedures around sexual harassment and assault. In particular, he presided over decisions to punish astronomer Geoffrey Marcy and then-incumbent Boalt Hall dean Sujit Choudhry.

Dirks was also a highly successful fundraiser, which included overseeing the completion of the Campaign for Berkeley. Prior to Dirks's arrival, Berkeley had a "terrible record of private fundraising," according to Harvard Business School professor William C. Kirby in his 2022 book Empires of Ideas: Creating the Modern University from Germany to America to China. In 2016, Dirks led Berkeley to raise nearly $480 million, which came from almost 100,000 gifts provided by more than 65,000 donors. He helped set university records for the total amount raised and number of gifts received. Launched by Dirks in 2014 and continued by his successor Carol T. Christ, Berkeley's Light the Way campaign went on to raise $7 billion.

Despite these gains, Dirks was criticized by some for his handling of UC Berkeley's budget. However, many of the financial struggles on the Berkeley campus preceded Dirks's chancellorship. The 2008 economic crisis resulted in a 20% reduction to the university's endowment between 2007 and 2009. Furthermore, state allocations to the flagship campus had been on the decline for decades prior to Dirks's chancellorship, with 2009 seeing the university's "sharpest drop in state financing since the Great Depression," according to The New York Times. The state accounted for 50% of Berkeley's budget in 1990 compared to 13% in 2020. When Dirks was in charge in 2016, the state allocation was just 57% of its 2007 level.

Other contentious matters were the size of the fence around the chancellor's residence, University House. and an emergency door installed in California Hall at university expense. However, it was determined that the fence and the emergency door were security measures, recommended by the University police, to address an increase in incidents in and around the chancellor's home. University House has had a history of violent incidents and the emergency door was installed in a shared office area intended for use by all administrative support staff, not exclusively the university chancellor.

On August 16, 2016, he announced his intent to resign, and on July 1, 2017 his resignation went into effect. In 2017, Dirks and his chief of staff, Nils Gilman, dealt with the aftermath of the Trump election, and various political clashes on the university's campus. Kirby noted in his book that "the challenges that followed Dirks's departure did not leave with him."

== The New York Academy of Sciences Leadership ==
Dirks assumed the leadership of The New York Academy of Sciences (the Academy) in June 2020. During his tenure as President and Chief Executive Officer, he's helped the Academy to steady its finances after a period of budgetary volatility, establish new and innovative programs, and earn various accolades.

Major programs and efforts he's helped to establish include the Tata Transformation Prize, which supports breakthrough, innovative technologies in scientific disciplines of importance to India's societal needs and economic competitiveness; the Artificial Intelligence and Society Fellowship Program, which, established in connection with Arizona State University, aims to develop a new generation of multidisciplinary scholars prepared to counsel the future use of AI in society for the benefit of humankind; and the International Science Reserve (ISR), which mobilizes the global scientific community to respond to complex crises across borders by establishing an open, global network of scientists and preparing them to act when crisis hits.

Various Academy programs have received recognitions during Dirks's tenure including a silver Anthem Award for the ISR (2023), a World Changing Idea Award from Fast Company for the ISR (2023), a silver Anthem Award for the Academy's Junior Academy program (2024), and a bronze Anthem Award for the Academy's Scientist-in-Residence program (2024).

Dirks navigated the Academy through the COVID-19 pandemic as lockdowns forced the two-century-old institution to significantly adapt its events-based operations. With events being a source of revenue, he supported efforts to make programs virtual so the Academy could continue to advance impactful scientific and educational programming, while also bringing in funds through registration costs and sponsorships. In particular, Dirks has helped to grow the Academy's Frontiers in Cancer Immunotherapies symposium. He also helped the Academy establish a merchandise store as another revenue source.

Dirks has also hosted a series of "fireside chats" at the Academy with prominent thought leaders such as Yann LeCun, Turing Award winner and Chief AI Scientist at Meta; and Reid Hoffman, co-founder of LinkedIn and a partner at the venture capital firm Greylock Partners. He also frequently contributes op-eds to media outlets including Time, The Atlantic, The Hill, Project Syndicate, Financial Times, Times Higher Education, and The Chronicle of Higher Education focused on Academy efforts as well as other matters pertaining to science, higher education, and policy. Additionally, he has represented the Academy at high-impact conferences such as the Aspen Ideas Festival, B20 Summit India, DeepFest, Techonomy, and Ai4.

== Personal life ==
Dirks is married to Janaki Bakhle, an alum of Columbia and a professor of history at UC Berkeley. She is the former director of the South Asia Institute at Columbia University and in 2024 published Savarkar and the Making of Hindutva through Princeton University Press.

== Selected works ==
- The Hollow Crown: Ethnohistory of an Indian Kingdom, Cambridge University Press, 1988, ISBN 978-0-521-05372-3
- Castes of Mind: Colonialism and the Making of Modern India, Princeton University Press, 2001, ISBN 0-691-08895-0
- The Scandal of Empire: India and the Creation of Imperial Britain, Harvard University Press, 2006, ISBN 978-0-674-02724-4
- Autobiography of an Archive: A Scholar's Passage to India, Columbia University Press, 2015.
- City of Intellect: The Uses and Abuses of the University, Princeton University Press, 2023, ISBN 9781009394437

Academic offices
| Preceded by Robert J. Birgeneau | Chancellor of the University of California, Berkeley; 2013 – 2017 | Succeeded by Carol T. Christ |
