= Castes of Mind =

Castes of Mind is the second book published by Nicholas Dirks, it was published in 2001. This book focused on the ways in which the caste system changed under British colonial rule, and how it continued to change in the postcolonial era. It develops the theories of his doctoral adviser Bernard Cohn that the Indian caste system took its rigid form under British rule.

== Reception ==
The work was praised by his contemporaries in a range of academic journals. According to anthropologist Chris Fuller, an emeritus professor at the London School of Economics, one of the "principal achievements" of the book was that it provided "a theory of the Indian colonial state as an ethnographic state, which was coherent and heuristically valuable." Kalyanakrishnan Sivaramakrishnan's review in American Anthropologist praised the book as an "attractive synthesis of key arguments that Dirks and others inspired by Bernard Cohn have made about colonial social engineering and colonial discourse in India." Roshan Wijeyeratne in South Asia Research called it a "compelling account of the extent to which customs around caste became positivism under the auspices of the dynamics of the colonial state."

In American Ethnologist, Diane P. Mines wrote, "As a historical study of British colonial and anthropological knowledge about caste and of the effects of that knowledge on Indian knowledge and politics today, it has no rival. Dirks convinces us that caste as it is shaped today is hardly a vestige of tradition but is, rather, a precipitate of a historical process mediated through colonialism and nationalism." In The American Historical Review, Sanjay Joshi observed, "The greatest strength of this book perhaps is its location of the discussions about caste firmly within the domain of colonial politics and history." Saurabh Dube in The Economic and Political Weekly echoed the praise, writing "The scope of the study is large, its sentences sculpted, its words measured, and its polemic provocative. This much awaited book raises crucial questions for anthropology and history, the study of the colony and the postcolony."

== Criticism ==
The geneticist David Reich in his 2018 book Who We Are and How We Got Here has claimed that the book's theory has been overturned by genetics, and specifically used the book as a counterpoint. It used genetics techniques over a data set of more than 250 sub castes spread throughout India, and found that a third of groups (a much larger than expected number than if there was little inbreeding) had seen population bottlenecks in the past, which were as strong or stronger than other groups known for endogamy such as the Ashkenazi Jews or the Finns, which showed that "long-term endogamy, as embodied in modern Indian society in the institution of caste, has been "overwhelmingly important for millennia."

== Awards ==
The book has won the Lionel Trilling Award and continues to be taught in graduate curricula in the U.S. and India.
