= Bernard Cohn (anthropologist) =

American anthropologist

- Born: May 13, 1928; New York City, U.S.
- Died: November 25, 2003 (aged 75); Chicago, Illinois, U.S.
- Education: University of Wisconsin–Madison (BA); Cornell University (PhD)
- Occupation: Anthropologist

Bernard S. Cohn (May 13, 1928 – November 23, 2003) was an American anthropologist and scholar of British colonialism in India, primarily affiliated with the University of Chicago.

== Life and career ==
Born in Brooklyn, New York, Cohn received a B.A. in history from the University of Wisconsin–Madison in 1949 and a Ph.D. in anthropology from Cornell University in 1954. From 1952-3 he engaged in field research in India as a Fulbright scholar. In addition to Chicago, he also taught at the University of Rochester and was a research assistant for the US Army at Fort Benning. In 1968, he was elected to the American Academy of Arts and Sciences.

== Works ==
Cohn's contributions included work on India's caste system, by which he claimed that caste was solidified as a concept by the British codification of it, as well as the establishment of historical anthropology as a means to link the disciplines of anthropology and history. This work intersected with earlier work about syncretism between these two disciplines by Alfred L. Kroeber, as well as essays by Clifford Geertz. Cohn's works include Colonialism and its Forms of Knowledge (1996), An Anthropologist Among the Historians (1987) and India: The Social Anthropology of a Civilization (1971). His students, including Nicholas Dirks, Ronald Inden, Vinay Lal, Antoinette Burton, and Ritty Lukose, have continued in the vein of his work. His work has been closely studied by members of Subaltern Studies, especially Ranajit Guha.
