= The Scandal of Empire =

Book by Nicholas Dirks

The Scandal of Empire: India and the Creation of Imperial Britain
- Author: Nicholas Dirks
- Language: English
- Subject: East India Company & Impeachment of Warren Hastings
- Genre: Non-fiction
- Publisher: Belknap Press
- Publication date: 2006
- Publication place: United States
- Pages: 416
- ISBN: 0674021665

The Scandal of Empire: India and the Creation of Imperial Britain is a book written by Nicholas Dirks, who was at the time the Franz Boas Professor of Anthropology and Professor of History at Columbia University, United States. The book was published in 2006.

The book focuses on 18th century Britain and on one of its most dramatic political controversies, the impeachment and trial of Warren Hastings, the Governor-General of Bengal from 1774 to 1784.
