= Jean-Claude Schmitt =

French medievalist

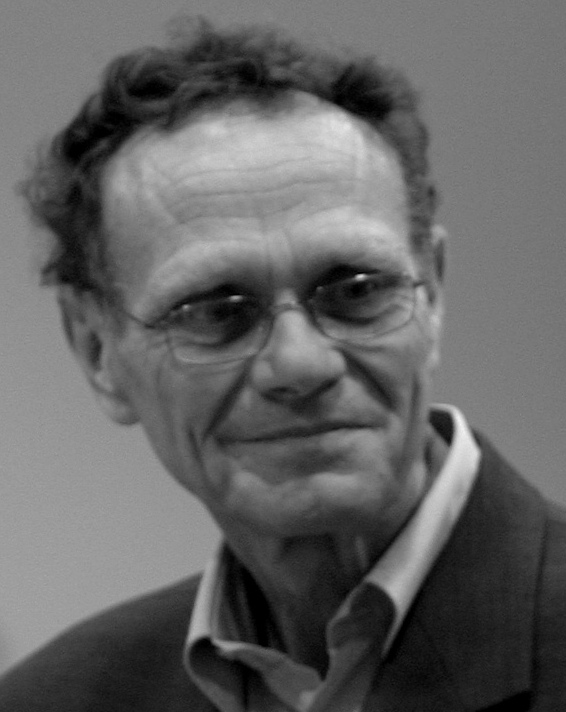
Jean-Claude Schmitt in 2009

Jean-Claude Schmitt (French pronunciation: [ʒɑ̃ klod ʃmit]; born 4 March 1946 in Colmar) is a prominent French medievalist, the former student of Jacques Le Goff, associated with the work of the Annales School. He studies the socio-cultural aspects of medieval history in Western Europe and has made important contributions in his use of anthropological and art historical methods to interpret history. His most significant work has dealt with the relationships among elites and laymen in medieval life, particularly in the realm of religious culture, where he has focused on ideas and topics such as superstition, the occult and heresy in order to flesh out the differing world-views of the lay peasantry and the clerical elites who attempted to define religious practice. He has contributed numerous books, articles and encyclopedia entries on these and related topics. He has also written widely on the cult of saints, the idea of adolescence, visions and dreams, and preaching.

Among Schmitt's best known works translated in English are The Holy Greyhound (1983), about the strange cult of a holy dog in medieval France, and Ghosts in the Middle Ages (1998) about notions of death, the afterlife and paranormal visions in medieval culture. Both works are considered important examples of "historical anthropology," or the use of methods and approaches borrowed from anthropology and other social sciences to investigate the past. Schmitt has argued that this has helped correct for the tendency among medievalists in the past to focus on elites, political institutions and narrative history to the exclusion of the lower classes and their less well-documented experiences of life.

Until 2014 Schmitt was Director of Studies at the École des Hautes Études en Sciences Sociales and directed the society of professional historians, Groupe d'Anthropologie Historique de l'Occident Médiéval.

== Select bibliography ==
- Le Saint Lévrier. Guinefort, guérisseur d’enfants depuis le XIIIe siècle (Flammarion, 1979)
- La Raison des gestes dans l’Occident médiéval (Gallimard, 1990)
- Les Revenants: les vivants et les morts dans la société médiévale (Gallimard, 1994)
- (Editor) L’Histoire des jeunes en Occident (Seuil, 1996)
- Le corps, les rites, les rêves, le temps : Essais d’anthropologie médiévale (Gallimard, 2001).
- (Contributing editor) Dictionnaire raisonné de l'Occident médiéval
- La Conversion d’Hermann le juif : Autobiographie, histoire et fiction 2004
