= André Beteille =

Indian sociologist and writer (1934–2026)

Padma Bhushan Andre Beteille FBA
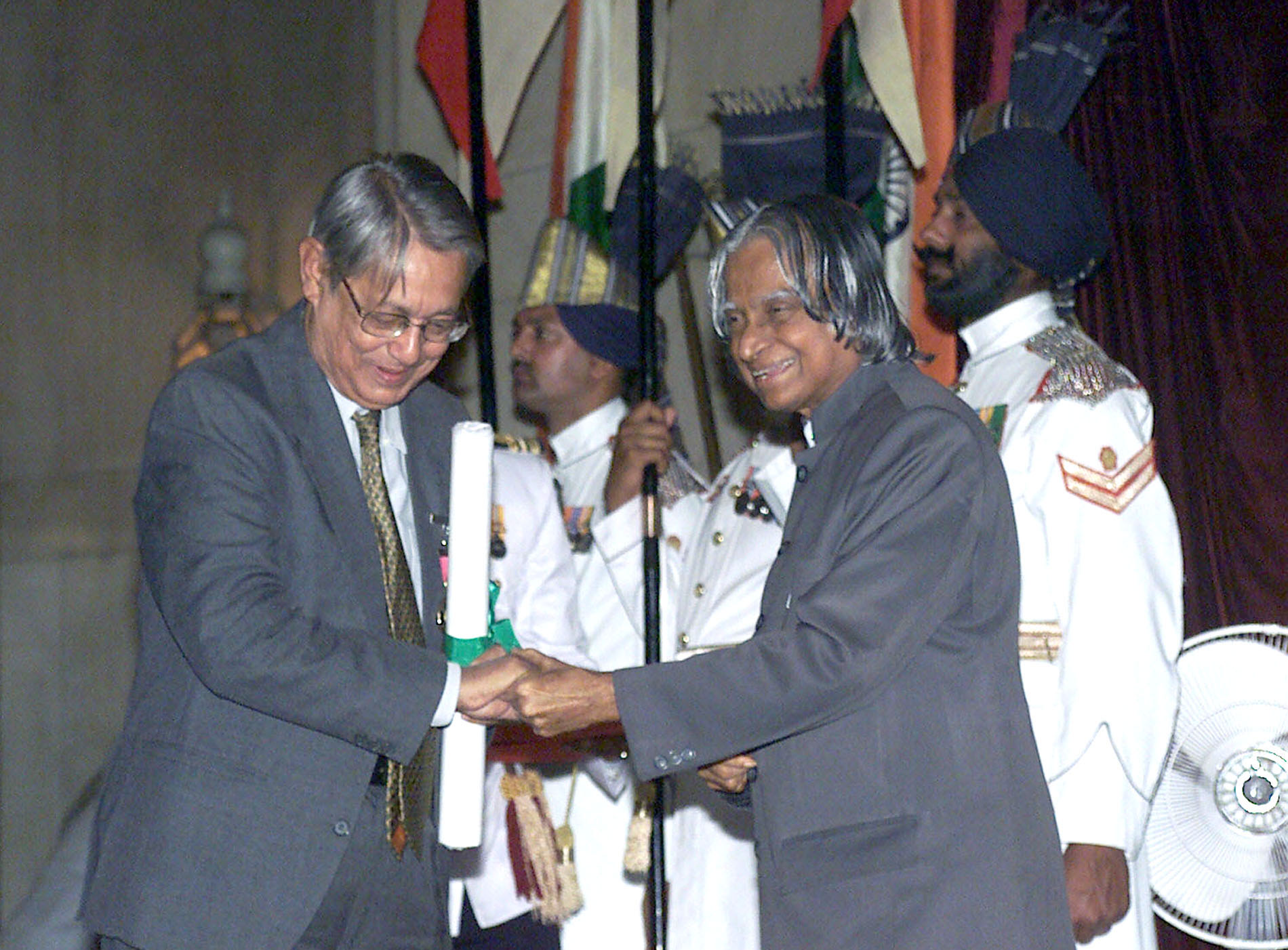
- Beteille (left) receives the Padma Bhushan from the President of India A. P. J. Abdul Kalam, c. 2005.
- Born: 30 September 1934; Chandannagar, Bengal Presidency, British India
- Died: 3 February 2026 (aged 91); New Delhi, India
- Awards: Padma Bhushan; Fellow of the British Academy

Academic background
- Education: University of Calcutta
- Influences: G. S. Ghurye

Academic work
- Discipline: Sociology
- Institutions: University of Oxford; University of Cambridge; University of Chicago; London School of Economics; Delhi School of Economics; Ashoka University

André Beteille (30 September 1934 – 3 February 2026) was an Indian sociologist, writer and academician. He was known for his studies of the caste system in South India. He served with educational institutions in India such as Delhi School of Economics, North Eastern Hill University (in Shillong), and Ashoka University.

== Early life and education ==
Beteille was born to a French father and an Indian Bengali mother. He received his undergraduate and graduate degrees in anthropology from the University of Calcutta. Thereafter he received his doctorate from the University of Delhi. After a brief stint at the Indian Statistical Institute as a research fellow, he joined the faculty of sociology at the Delhi School of Economics.

== Career ==
Beteille taught at universities including Oxford University, Cambridge University, the University of Chicago, and the London School of Economics. He also served as the Chairman of the Centre for Studies in Social Sciences, Calcutta and of the Indian Council of Social Science Research.

He was a Professor of Sociology at the Delhi School of Economics at the University of Delhi where, since 2003, he remained Professor Emeritus of Sociology. He was appointed National Research Professor by the Government of India in 2007.

Beteille later served as the Chancellor of North Eastern Hill University, Shillong, Meghalaya, and prior to that served as Chancellor of Ashoka University.

== Death ==
Beteille died in New Delhi on 3 February 2026, at the age of 91.

== Awards and recognition ==
Beteille was a recipient of the third highest civilian honour of India, the Padma Bhushan, and was also made a Fellow of the British Academy (FBA). He also served on the Social Sciences jury for the Infosys Prize in 2010.

== Bibliography ==
- Sociology: Essays on Approach and Method, Oxford University Press, 2002.
- Antinomies of Society: Essays on Ideologies and Institutions, Oxford University Press, 2000.
- Chronicles of Our Time, Penguin Books, 2000.
- The Backward Classes in Contemporary India, Oxford University Press, 1992.
- Social and Cultural Reproduction of Caste, Kinship and Occupation in India, 1991.
- Society and Politics in India: Essays in a Comparative Perspective, Athlone Press, 1991 (L.S.E. Monographs in Social Anthropology, no. 63).
- The Idea of Natural Inequality and Other Essays, Oxford University Press, 1983 (new, enlarged edition, Oxford University Press, 1987).
- Inequality Among Men, Basil Blackwell, 1977 (Italian edition published as La diseguaglianza fra gli uomini, Il Mulino, 1981).
- Studies in Agrarian Social Structure, Oxford University Press, 1974.
- Six Essays in Comparative Sociology, Oxford University Press, 1974 (enlarged edition published as Essays in Comparative Sociology, Oxford University Press, 1987).
- Inequality and Social Change, Oxford University Press, 1972.
- Castes: Old and New, Essays in Social Structure and Social Stratification, Asia Publishing House, 1969.
- Caste, Class and Power: Changing Patterns of Stratification in a Tanjore Village, University of California Press, 1965.

=== Essays ===
- Secularism Re-examined
- Race & Caste
- Teaching & Research
- Teaching and Research, Andre Beteille
- Government & NGOs
