= Historical anthropology =

Historiographical approach

Historical anthropology is a historiographical movement which applies methodologies and objectives from social and cultural anthropology to the study of historical societies. Like most such movements, it is understood in different ways by different scholars, and to some may be synonymous with the history of mentalities, cultural history, ethnohistory, microhistory, history from below or Alltagsgeschichte. Anthropologists whose work has been particularly inspirational to historical anthropology include Emile Durkheim, Heinrich Schurtz, Arnold van Gennep, Lucien Lévy-Bruhl, Marcel Mauss, Clifford Geertz, Jack Goody, and Victor Turner.

Peter Burke has contrasted historical anthropology with social history, finding that historical anthropology tends to focus on qualitative rather than quantitative data, smaller communities, and symbolic aspects of culture. Thus it reflects a turn in 1960s Marxist historiography away from 'the orthodox Marxist approach to human behaviour in which actors are seen as motivated in the first instance by economics, and only secondarily by culture or ideology', in the work of historians such as E. P. Thompson.

Historical anthropology was rooted in the Annales school, associated with a succession of major historians such as Fernand Braudel, Jacques Le Goff, Emmanuel Le Roy Ladurie and Pierre Nora, along with researchers from elsewhere in Europe such as Carlo Ginzburg. The label historical anthropology has been actively promoted by some recent Annales school historians, such as Jean-Claude Schmitt. Established in 1929 by Marc Bloch and Lucien Febvre, the journal Annales. Histoire, Sciences sociales is still among the most influential French publications for research in historical anthropology.

Historical anthropology has been open to similar criticisms to anthropology: 'as Bernard Cohn and John and Jean Comaroff have observed, studies in which societies were represented in this way were often partial, biased, and unwitting handmaidens to the domination of non-Western peoples by Europeans and Americans'. But since the Second World War, increasingly reflexive approaches have led to sophisticated developments of the field, and the banner of 'historical anthropology' has often attracted Anglo-American historians in ways that the Annales school did not: key figures have been Sidney Mintz, Jay O'Brien, William Roseberry, Marshall Sahlins, Jane Schneider, Peter Schneider, Eric Wolf, Peter Burke, and people from elsewhere in the world such as Aaron Gurevich.

== See also ==
- Cultural anthropology
- Historiography
- Rural history
- Nouvelle histoire
- Social history
- Marxist historiography
