= Arvind Sharma =

Indian professor of Comparative Religion (born 1940)

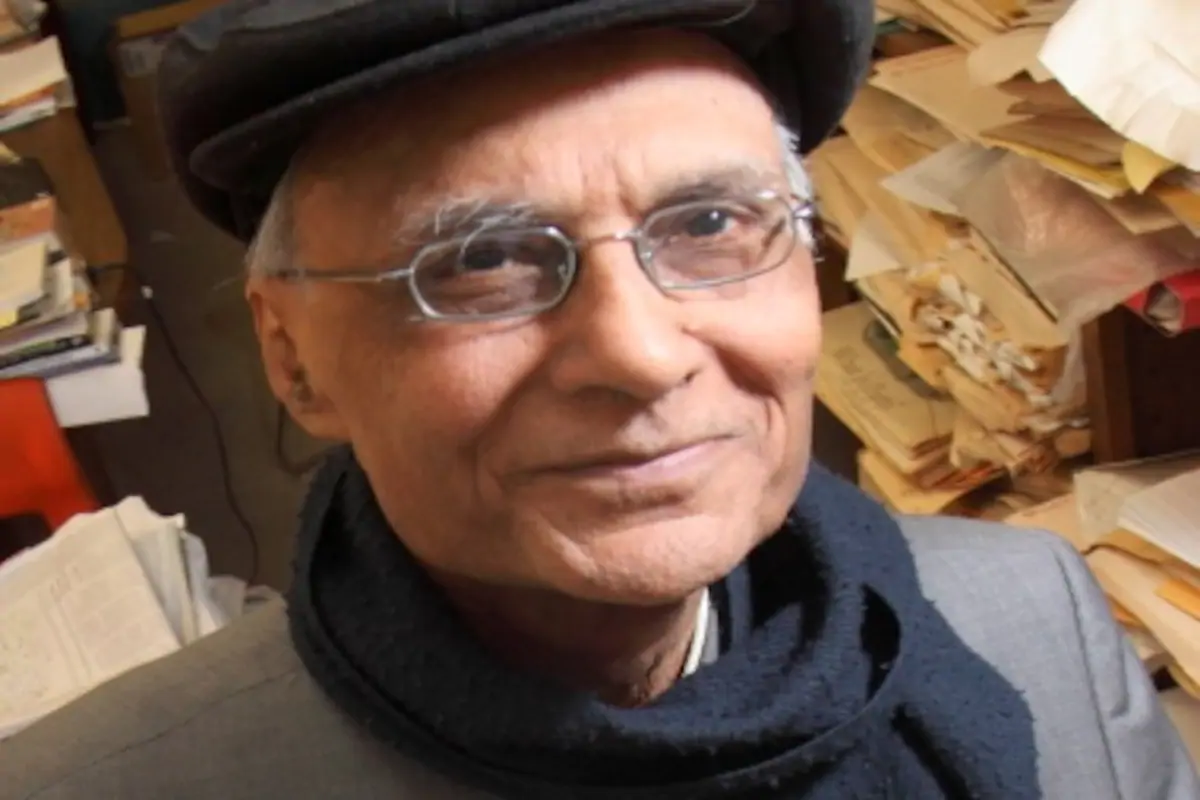
- Born: 13 January 1940 (age 86); Benares, Benares State, British India
- Died: 29 September 2026
- Education: Allahabad University (B.A. 1958), Syracuse University (M.A. in economics, 1970), Harvard University (M.T.S. in Theological Studies, 1974; PhD in Sanskrit and Indian Studies, 1978)
- Known for: Comparative Religion, the philosophy of religion, human rights and religion, theoretical and methodological issues in the study of religion, Advaita Vedanta, Hindu studies, Sanskrit studies, Women in religion
- Scientific career
- Fields: Religious Studies
- Workplaces: McGill University
- Website: Arvind Sharma

Arvind Sharma (13 January 1940 – 29 September 2026) was the Birks Professor of Comparative Religion at McGill University from 1994 until 2026. Sharma's works focus on Hinduism, philosophy of religion. In editing books his works include Our Religions and Women in World Religions, Feminism in World Religions was selected as a Choice Outstanding Academic Book (1999).

Arvind Sharma was awarded Padma Shri, India's fourth highest civilian award, in 2025.

== Biography ==
Arvind Sharma was born on 13 January 1940 in Varanasi, India. He received his B.A. from Allahabad University in 1958. He served in civil services in Gujarat until 1968 he went to US to pursue higher studies in economics at the Syracuse University, obtaining a Masters in economics in 1970. While pursuing the role of non-economic factors in economic development he became interested in religion and joined Harvard Divinity School in 1972. After obtaining a Masters in Theological Studies, he earned his PhD from the Department of Sanskrit and Indian Studies in 1978.

While at Harvard he was recruited in 1976 by the newly founded Department of Studies in Religion at the University of Queensland in Brisbane, Australia. In 1980 he moved to the University of Sydney. In 1994 he was appointed the Birks Professor of Comparative Religion at McGill University, where he taught until the semester before his passing.

The archives of Arvind Sharma are held at McGill University (MUA).

== Bibliography ==
The author, editor or co-editor of more than 50 books and 500 articles, his notable works include:

- The Ruler's Gaze: A Study of British Rule over India from a Saidian Perspective (Harper Collins Publishers, 2018) ISBN 978-9-352-64102-4
- Hinduism as a Missionary Religion (State University of New York Press, 2011) ISBN 978-1-4384-3211-3
- The Philosophy of Religion and Advaita Vedanta (Pennsylvania State University Press, 2008) ISBN 978-0-271-02832-3
- Part of the Problem, Part of the Solution: Religion Today and Tomorrow (Praeger Publishers, 2008) ISBN 978-0-313-35899-9
- Hermeneutics and Hindu Thought: Toward a Fusion of Horizons (Springer, 2008) ISBN 978-1-4020-8191-0
- Fundamentalism And Women in World Religions (T. & T. Clark Publishers] 2007) ISBN 978-0-567-02533-3
- Goddesses And Women In The Indic Religious Tradition (Brill Academic Publishers, 2005) ISBN 978-90-04-12466-0
- New Focus on Hindu Studies (DK Print World, 2005) ISBN 978-81-246-0307-9
- A New Curve in the Ganges (DK Print World, 2005) ISBN 978-81-246-0271-3
- Christianity and Human Rights: Influences and Issues (State University of New York Press, 2007) ISBN 978-0-7914-6952-1
- The Quest for Serenity in World Religions (DK Printworld, 2007) ISBN 978-81-246-0420-5
- A Guide to Hindu Spirituality (World Wisdom, 2006) ISBN 978-1-933316-17-8
- Hindu Egalitarianism: Equality or Justice? (Rupa & Co., 2006) ISBN 978-81-291-0833-3
- Advaita Vedanta (Ludwig Verlag, 2006) ISBN 978-3-7787-8186-9
- Are Human Rights Western?: A Contribution to the Dialogue of Civilizations (Oxford University Press, 2006) ISBN 978-0-19-567948-9
- Modern Hindu Thought: An Introduction (Oxford University Press, 2005) ISBN 978-0-19-567638-9
- Dharma (DK Print World, 2005) ISBN 978-81-246-0270-6
- Sleep As a State of Consciousness in Advaita (State University of New York Press, 2004) ISBN 978-0-7914-6251-5
- The Buddhism Omnibus: Comprising Gautama Buddha, The Dhammapada, and The Philosophy of Religion (Oxford University Press, 2004) ISBN 978-0-19-566898-8
- Her Voice, Her Faith: Women Speak On World Religions (Westview Press, 2004) ISBN 978-0-8133-4257-3
- Hinduism and Human Rights: A Conceptual Approach (Law in India) (Oxford University Press, 2004) ISBN 978-0-19-566585-7
- Advaita Vedanta: An Introduction (Motilal Banarsidass, 2004) ISBN 978-81-208-2027-2
- The Study of Hinduism (University of South Carolina Press, 2003) ISBN 978-1-57003-449-7
- Hinduism and Its Sense of History (Oxford University Press, 2003) ISBN 978-0-19-566531-4
- Methodology in Religious Studies: The Interface With Women's Studies (State University of New York Press, 2003) ISBN 978-0-7914-5347-6
- Modern Hindu Thought: The Essential Texts (Oxford University Press, 2002) ISBN 978-0-19-565315-1
- Women in Indian Religions (Oxford University Press, 2002) ISBN 978-0-19-564634-4
- Religion in a Secular City: Essays in Honor of Harvey Cox (Trinity Press International, 2001) ISBN 978-1-56338-337-3
- Hinduism and Secularism: After Ayodhya (Palgrave Macmillan, 2001) ISBN 978-0-333-79406-7
- Sati: Historical and Phenomenological Essays (Motilal Banarsidass, 2001) ISBN 978-81-208-0464-7
- Annual Review of Women in World Religions, the (Annual Review of Women in World Religions) (State University of New York Press, 2001) ISBN 978-0-7914-5426-8
- Classical Hindu Thought: An Introduction (Oxford University Press, 2000) ISBN 978-0-19-564441-8
- The Annual Review of Women in World Religions (State University of New York Press, 1999) ISBN 978-0-7914-4346-0
- A Dome of Many Colors: Studies in Religious Pluralism, Identity, and Unity (Trinity Press International, 1999) ISBN 978-1-56338-267-3
- Feminism and World Religions (State University of New York Press, 1998) ISBN 978-0-7914-4024-7
- The Concept of Universal Religion in Modern Hindu Thought (Palgrave Macmillan, 1998) ISBN 978-0-312-21647-4
- Neo-Hindu Views of Christianity (Brill Academic Publishers, 1988) ISBN 978-90-04-08791-0
- The Philosophy of Religion: A Buddhist Perspective (Oxford University Press, 1997) ISBN 978-0-19-564272-8
- Women in World Religions (South Asia Books, 1995) ISBN 978-81-7030-428-9
- Our Religions: The Seven World Religions Introduced by Preeminent Scholars from Each Tradition(HarperOne, 1994) ISBN 978-0-06-067700-8
- The Little Clay Cart (State University of New York Press, 1994) ISBN 978-0-7914-1726-3
- Today's Woman in World Religions (State University of New York Press, 1994) ISBN 978-0-7914-1687-7
- The Experiential Dimension of Advaita Vedanta (Motilal Banarsidass, 1993) ISBN 978-81-208-1058-7
- The Annual Review of Women in World Religions: Heroic Women (State University of New York Press, 1992) ISBN 978-0-7914-1611-2
