= Ahar caste =

Ahar
Regions with significant populations
- India

Languages
- • Hindi • Braj Bhasha

Religion
- • Hinduism

The Ahars, also called Ahir or Yadav, are a peasant or agricultural caste of North India.

The group labelled Ahar were generally found in a few west-central districts of India, but in the 1931 census of India appeared in large numbers recorded in the north-central districts, though not in any of the districts between the former and latter. They claim to be descended from Yadu race.
