= Ronald Inden =

American indologist

Professor Emeritus Ronald B. Inden
- Known for: Ancient and Medieval India; Hindu Thought; Cultural Studies; Orientalism

Academic work
- Discipline: History
- Sub-discipline: Linguistics
- Institutions: University of Chicago
- Notable works: Imagining India

Ronald B. Inden is an American indologist. He is a professor emeritus in the Departments of History and of South Asian Languages and Civilizations at the University of Chicago and is a major scholar in South Asian and post-colonial studies.

== Career ==
Inden has spent the bulk of his professional career at University of Chicago. Inspired by Edward Said's Orientalism, he began a critical investigation of how social scientific knowledge was shaped by the colonial conditions of its production. Imagining India was a critical survey of the field of Indology and argued that most scholarship consistently failed to treat Indians as rational subjects and knowing actors who were intelligently involved in the creation of their social worlds. "The immense learning and analytical sharpness of the book is evident from the very first chapter" Inden advocated for ways of knowing India that are not so limited by colonialism and its legacies.

R. G. Collingwood's works, including An Essay on Philosophical Method and The Idea of History, were especially influential in Inden's thought during this period. He took Collingwood's notion of a "scale of forms" and used it to develop an approach opposed to a "hierarchy of essences". In general, in Inden's work the past two decades, the focus has been on the limitations of what he calls essentializing or substantializing discourses which understand agents as more or less reflections of a single, internally consistent idea. He argues that Indology returns to a small number of relatively fixed themes to make sense out of India. India, in this indological version, is feminine, jungle-like, religious, caste-riven, village-based, irrational and, fundamentally, the opposite of the West. Inden, on the contrary, emphasizes that there's an irreducible tension in scholarship and that India and the West need to be understood as both "opposites" and "distincts" and that they have "differences in quality" as well as "differences in kind". Essentializing forms of knowledge emphasize only the differences in quality and the extent to which the West and India are opposites.

== Publications ==
- Imagining India. Oxford, Basil Blackwell, 1990.
- Marriage and Rank in Bengali Culture: A History of Caste and Clan in Middle Period Bengal. University of California Press, 1975.
- "Transcending Identities in Modern India's World," in Politics and the Ends of Identity, ed. Kathryn Dean. London, Ashgate, 1997, 64–102.
- "Embodying God: From Imperial Progresses to National Progress in India," Economy and Society, 24.2 (May 1995), 245–78.
- "Changes in the Vedic Priesthood," Ritual, State and History in South Asia: Essays in honour of J. C. Heesterman, ed. A. W. van den Hoek, D. H. A. Kolff, & M. S. Oort. Leiden, E. J. Brill, 1992, pp. 556–77.
- "Tradition Against Itself," American Ethnologist, XIII.4 (November 1986), 762–75.
- "Orientalist Constructions of India," Modern Asian Studies, XX.3 (1986), 401–46.

=== Reviews of Imagining India' ===
- Mani, Lata. The Journal of Asian Studies Vol. 50, No. 2 (May, 1991), pp. 435–436
- Mines, Mattison. American Ethnologist Vol. 20, No. 2 (May, 1993), pp. 415–416
- Prakash, Gyan. The American Historical Review Vol. 97, No. 2 (Apr., 1992), pp. 601–602
- Raheja, Gloria Goodwin. American Anthropologist New Series, Vol. 94, No. 1 (Mar., 1992), pp. 235–236
- Quigley, Declan. Modern Asian Studies, Vol. 25, No. 2 (1991), pp. 403–406.
