= Reservation policy in Indian Institutes of Technology =

The Indian Institutes of Technology (IITs) practices affirmative action and offers reservation to the "backward and weaker sections" of the society that includes SC/ST/OBC-NCL/EWS/PWD/Female candidates.

As of 2022, the percentages of student seats reserved for each category, for undergraduate (B. Tech/B. Sc. programs) stand at:

- GEN-EWS: 10%
- OBC-NCL: 27%
- SC: 15%
- ST: 7.5%

In addition to this, 5% of seats of each category (including OPEN) are reserved for Persons with Disability (PwD) candidates. The seats are also of two pools - Gender-Neutral (80%) and Female-Only (20%). If a female fails to get her seat in Female-Only category, she gets admitted via the Gender-Neutral category of seats. Supernumerary seats were created to reach the 1:4 gender ratio requirement in 2018. The overall seat breakdown, including the count of female-supernumerary seats, is:

Percentage of Seats by category.
Pool	OPEN	GEN-EWS	OBC-NCL	SC	ST	OPEN-PWD	GEN-EWS-PWD	OBC-NCL-PWD	SC-PWD	ST-PWD
Gender-Neutral	30.78%	7.60%	20.52%	11.40%	5.70%	1.62%	0.40%	1.08%	0.60%	0.30%
Female-Only	7.695%	1.90%	5.13%	2.85%	1.425%	0.405%	0.10%	0.28%	0.14%	0.075%

In addition to all these, every IIT has an additional 2 seats reserved for children of deceased/permanently injured officers of defence services. (Reference for this data: JoSAA Website)

== Recent developments ==
In 1989, Prime Minister V. P. Singh accepted and implemented the proposals of Mandal Commission that recommended provisions for reservations in private unaided institutions as well as high-end government jobs for minorities communities. It also laid stress on including the OBCs in the purview of reservations. There were massive student protests throughout the country against it, but the proposals were eventually implemented. However, no changes took place in the IITs because of the legislation. But in the year 2005, based on the recommendations of an independent panel, the UPA government at the centre proposed to implement quota system for Scheduled caste, Schedule tribe, Other Backward Classes and minority communities in IITs and IIMs (for both students and faculty). To pave way for such reservation scheme, the Constitution of India was amended (the 93rd Constitutional Amendment, originally drafted as 104th Amendment Bill). In 2006, the UPA government promised to implement 27% reservation for OBCs in institutes of higher education (twenty central universities, the IITs, IIMs and AIIMS) after 2006 Assembly elections.

This led to sharp reactions from the student communities in the institutes concerned and also substantial opposition from students of other colleges as well. Students gathered under the banner of "Youth For Equality" and demanded that the government roll back its decision to grant more reservations. Nearly 150 students went on hunger strike in AIIMS (Delhi) which, as on 23 May has entered into its ninth day. Within the next few days, students from all IITs joined the protest in one form or the other. Student protesters were reportedly beaten brutally in Mumbai and Delhi. Resident doctors from all over India joined the protests crippling the health infrastructure of a number of cities. The government took stern measures to counter the protesting doctors by serving them with suspension letters and asking them to vacate the hostels to make way for newly recruited doctors. Many states have invoked the Essential Services Maintenance Act (ESMA) and gave notice to the doctors to return to work in 24 hours failing which legal action will be taken against them. The government has also put on alert 6,000 men from Rapid Action Force to take care of any untoward incident. However, in most places the protesters remained defiant regarding ESMA. Few IIT students also wrote to the President of India requesting him to allow them to commit suicide if the proposed reservation is implemented.

In addition to complete roll-back of the proposed reservation, the striking protesters have demanded that an expert committee comprising members from non-political organisations to review the existing reservation policy and find out whether reservation for OBCs is required at all. This is based on the current confusion over actual population of OBC as various organisations have indicated various figures for the population of OBCs. This is mostly because the 1931 national census was the last time detailed population and economic data was gathered along with caste information for the OBC population. The Mandal Commission, using extrapolated 1931 Census figures, put it at 52 per cent, the National Sample Survey Organisation (NSSO) at 32 per cent and the National Family and Health Survey at 29.8 per cent. Keeping in view the fact that already 23.5% of all college seats are reserved for OBCs, the rationale of extending reservation is debated. The protesters also demand that no penal action be taken against the protesters and publication of a white paper by the government, making its stand clear on reservation.

Meanwhile, the National Knowledge Commission has requested the government to maintain the status-quo on the issue; 6 out of 8 of its members felt that alternative avenues have been insufficiently explored. After the HRD minister Arjun Singh criticised the Knowledge Commission for its stand, two members of the commission (Pratap Bhanu Mehta and Andre Beteille) resigned on 22 May 2006. Around the same time, a section of the media has reported that IIT Delhi, an elite institution is half-hearted about reservation and that it denied admission to the top ranking Scheduled caste student in its post-graduate programme. The NRI Quota was once started where Indian Kids living outside India got admission in the IIT's through their SAT scores, the NRI Quota should not pass over 2.5% of the overall seats. The NRI Quota was later stopped due to low quality of students.

On 29 March 2007, the Supreme Court of India, as an interim measure, stayed the law providing for 27 percent reservation for Other Backward Classes in educational institutions like IITs and IIMs. This was done in response to a public interest litigation — Ashoka Kumar Thakur vs. Union of India. The Court held that the 1931 census could not be a determinative factor for identifying the OBCs for the purpose of providing reservation. The supreme court also observed, "Reservation cannot be permanent and appear to perpetuate backwardness".

On 10 April 2008, the Supreme Court of India upheld the law that provides for 27% reservation for Other Backward Castes (OBCs) in educational institutions supported by the Central government, while ruling that the creamy layer among the OBCs should be excluded from the quota.

On 22 February 2021, a plea has been moved before the Supreme Court seeking direction to all the twenty-three Indian Institutes of Technology (IIT) to follow the reservation policy in the admission in research degree program and recruitment of faculty in the IITs.

=== Reservation for faculty ===
On 9 June 2008, the government ordered 15% quota for SC, 7.5% for ST and 27% quota for OBCs in teaching positions. IITs currently have no reservations in teaching positions. On 5 December 2022, the Supreme Court has directed the centre to follow the reservation policy for admission in research degree programmes and recruitment of faculty members at IITs as provided under the Central Educational Institutions (Reservation in Teachers' Cadre) Act, 2019. This was done in response to a public interest litigation — Dr. Sachchida Nand Pandey vs. Union of India.
