= Ninety-third Amendment of the Constitution of India =

Permits reservations for Other Backward Classes in education

The Constitution (Ninety-third Amendment) Act, 2005

Parliament of India
- Long title: An Act further to amend the Constitution of India.
- Citation: 93rd Amendment
- Territorial extent: India
- Passed by: Lok Sabha
- Passed by: Rajya Sabha
- Assented to: 20 January 2006
- Commenced: 20 January 2006
- Status: In force

The Ninety-third Amendment of the Constitution of India, officially known as The Constitution (Ninety-third Amendment) Act, 2005 enabled the provision of reservation (27%) for Other Backward Class(OBCs) in government as well as private educational institutions.

As a result of this law, Article 15 of the Indian Constitution includes Clause (5), which offers the State the power to make special provisions for the advancement of any socially and educationally backward classes of citizens, which are officially known as Other Backward Classes, as well as for the Scheduled Castes and Scheduled Tribes, with regards to admissions to educational institutions, including private unaided institutions.

The act was enforced in India from 20 January 2006, after it was passed by the Parliament of India and received presidential assent. After passage of the Amendment act, the Parliament passed the Central Educational Institutions(CEIs) (Reservation in Admission) Act, 2006 (Note: The Central Educational Institutions(CEIs) (Reservation in Admission) Act, 2006 provides for the reservation of students belonging to the Other Backward Classes (OBCs) of citizens to the extent of 27%, in Central Educational Institutions (CEIs) established, maintained or aided by the Central Government subject to exceptions provided under Section 4 of the Act). This led to 2006 Indian anti-reservation protests.

The Supreme Court of India upheld the reservations in its landmark judgement. On 10 April 2008, in the Ashoka Kumar Thakur v. Union of India case, the Supreme Court upheld the 93rd Constitutional Amendment and Central Educational Institutions(CEIs) (Reservation in Admission) Act, 2006, for the provision of 27% quota for candidates belonging to the Other Backward Classes in All India Institute of Medical Sciences (AIIMS), Indian Institutes of Technology (IITs), National Institutes of Technology (NITs), Indian Institutes of Management (IIMs), Indian Institute of Science (IISc) and other central educational institutions.

== Background ==
India is divided into many endogamous groups i.e. castes and sub-castes, as a result of social stratification and presence of untouchability. During the British Raj, some methods for upliftment of these depressed classes were introduced by the British, progressive thinkers and Hindu reformers. These included reservations in the legislature and in government jobs. After independence, the Indian constitution introduced provisions for reservations for the Scheduled Castes and Tribes (SC/ST) in government institutions, to give a fair representation to the weakest sections of society i.e. Dalits and Adivasis. 22.5% of the seats (SC- 15%, ST- 7.5%) in higher education institutes and public sector undertakings at both state and central level were set-aside for them. Uplifting the SC/ST's representation par with the upper castes has not yet been achieved.

In 1989, the then-Prime Minister of India V. P. Singh accepted and implemented nationwide the proposals of the Mandal Commission, which had been established by the Morarji Desai-led Janata Party government in 1979. The proposals of this commission recommended 27% reservation for Other Backward Classes (OBCs) in public sector undertakings and state-level educational institutions. OBC's were a group of castes which fell in-between the upper castes and Dalits; they were historically not oppressed and socially boycotted as the Dalits and Adivasis, but were still socially, educationally and economically backward compared to the upper castes.

After the State Assembly elections in Tamil Nadu, Kerala, Puducherry, Assam and West Bengal, the Union Minister of Human Resource Development, Arjun Singh promised to reserve 27% seats for Other Backward Classes in All India Institute of Medical Sciences (AIIMS), Indian Institutes of Technology (IITs), National Institutes of Technology (NITs), Indian Institutes of Management (IIMs), Indian Institute of Science (IISc) and other central institutions of higher education. The Constitution (93rd Amendment) Act 2005 that was introduced by the First Manmohan Singh ministry, granted a 27% reservation for Other Backward Classes in all Central Government institutions.

== Text of 93 Amendment ==
The text of the 93rd amendment reads-

(1) This Act may be called the Constitution (Ninety-third Amendment) Act, 2005.

(2) It shall come into force on such date as the Central Government may, by notification in the Official Gazette.

In article 15 of the Constitution, after clause (4), the following clause shall be inserted, namely:- "(5) Nothing in this article or in sub-clause (g) of clause (1) of article 19 shall prevent the State from making any special provision, by law, for the advancement of any socially and educationally backward classes of citizens or for the Scheduled Castes or the Scheduled Tribes in so far as such special provisions relate to their admission to educational institutions including private educational institutions, whether aided or unaided by the State, other than the minority educational institutions referred to in clause (1) of article 30."

== 2006 Indian anti-reservation protests ==
The 2006 Indian anti-reservation protests were a series of protests that took place in India in 2006 in opposition to the decision of the Union Government of India, led by the Indian National Congress-headed multiparty coalition United Progressive Alliance, to implement reservations for the Other Backward Classes (OBCs) in central and private institutes of higher education by 93rd Amendment 2005 and Central Educational Institutions(Reservation in Admission) Act 2006. These protests were one of the two major protests against the Indian reservation system, the other one being the 1990 anti-Mandal protests.

This move led to widespread opposition from students, as the proposal would reduce seats for the general category from the existing 77.5% to less than 51% (since members of OBCs are also allowed to contest in the General category), despite assurance from the government that the number of seats in these educational institutes will be increased so that effectively there will be no reduction in the number of seats available for the general category. The opposing students also felt that the government's move was merely to placate and consolidate the OBC vote bank. The private sector organisations too opposed the move, saying it would impede merit and reduce the competitiveness of the students.

Medical students in Delhi took the lead and drew support from their counterparts in other cities, such as Mumbai, and IIT Roorkee students. The protesters organised themselves under the banner of Youth For Equality and demanded a rollback of the quota, a white paper on the reservation policy and alternative ways of affirmative action.

== Supreme Court Judgement ==
On 10 April 2008, in the Ashoka Kumar Thakur v. Union of India case, the Supreme Court of India upheld the 93rd Constitutional Amendment and Central Educational Institutions(CEIs) (Reservation in Admission) Act, 2006, for the provision of 27% quota for candidates belonging to the Other Backward Classes in IITs, NITs, IIMs, AIIMS, IISc and other premier educational institutions. But it directed the government to exclude the "creamy layer", families whose annual salary in more than ₹4,50,000, among the OBCs while implementing the law. However, the "creamy layer" exclusion would not be applied to the SC/STs.

== See also ==
- Forward Castes
- Other Backward Class
- Reservation in India
- Mandal Commission
- Mandal Commission protests of 1990
- 2006 Indian anti-reservation protests
- V. P. Singh
- Arjun Singh
- List of amendments of the Constitution of India
