= One Hundred and Fifth Amendment of the Constitution of India =

Amendment of 2021

Constitution (One Hundred and Fifth Amendment) Act, 2021

Parliament of India
- Territorial extent: India
- Passed by: Lok Sabha
- Passed: 10 August 2021
- Passed by: Rajya Sabha
- Passed: 11 August 2021
- Assented to: 18 August 2021
- Effective: 15 August 2021

Legislative history

First chamber: Lok Sabha
- Bill title: THE CONSTITUTION (ONE HUNDRED AND TWENTY-SEVENTH AMENDMENT) BILL, 2021
- Bill citation: Bill No. 124 of 2021
- Introduced by: Minister of Social Justice and Empowerment, Dr. Virendra Kumar

Summary
- Restores the power of State governments to recognise socially and educationally backward classes.

Keywords
- Reservation, Socially and Educationally Backward Classes, Other Backward Classes, Federalism
- Status: In force

The One Hundred and Fifth Amendment (or 105th Constitutional Amendment) to the Constitution of India- officially known as Constitution (One Hundred and Fifth Amendment) Act, 2021- restored the power of State governments to recognise socially and educationally backward classes (SEBCs). SEBCs, which includes the groups commonly known as Other Backward Classes (OBCs), are communities for which the State can provide "special provisions" or affirmative action in India.

In May 2021, the Supreme Court held that the 102nd Constitutional Amendment, 2018 had taken away the State governments' powers to recognise SEBCs. This power had been exercised by States for decades, and regional and national parties almost unanimously demanded an amendment to restore the power. In August 2021, over just 3 days, the Bill was introduced and passed by both Houses of Parliament. The 105th Constitutional Amendment Act received Presidential Assent on 18 August.

== Background ==
For decades, State governments in India have recognised socially and educationally backward classes, providing them with reservations in education and public employment. For example, Shahuji, a Maratha king provided reservations for Dalits and backward classes in July 1902. Tamil Nadu had provided reservations as early as 1947. In 1992, the Union government introduced its own separate scheme for SEBCs recognised in a Central List, acting on the basis of the Mandal Commission.

The Supreme Court held that both the Union and the State governments had the power to recognise SEBCs and provide them with reservations in its landmark 1992 decision, Indra Sawhney & Others v. Union of India. This could be done through separate State Lists and a Central List, which would apply for the benefits under the State or Union government respectively. In the same decision, the Court also held that before recognising a community as an SEBC and providing any affirmative action, the government must conduct an exercise to evaluate whether they are backward. This was to be done through Backward Classes Commissions both at the State and National level. In 1993, Parliament set up the National Commission for Backward Classes (NCBC) as a statutory authority for this purpose. Since then State governments have also had their own Backward Classes Commissions in order to evaluate backwardness and affirmative action policies.

Since 1992, the demand for greater protections for backward classes grew. In 2018, Parliament passed the 102nd Constitutional Amendment Act. The Amendment made the NCBC a constitutional authority, which had to be consulted on any policy matters regarding SEBCs, including recognition of communities. It also introduced an Article that gave the power to recognise SEBCs to the President of India who would notify a Central List of SEBCs. This List could only be amended by the Parliament. This procedure was similar to the ones in place for recognising Scheduled Castes and Scheduled Tribes.

When the Act was being considered by Parliament, members of the Opposition raised concerns about whether this meant that State Lists of SEBCs would no longer be valid. The Minister of Social Justice and Empowerment clarified that this was not the intention. The Amendment would only change how the Union recognised SEBCs and State Lists would continue. Most political parties almost unanimously wanted to retain State powers. The Amendment was passed following this clarification.

=== The Maratha Reservations Case ===
In May 2021, the Supreme Court pronounced its judgment in Jaishri Laxmanrao Patil v Chief Minister, Maharashtra. In November 2018, the Maharashtra state legislature passed a law to recognise Marathas as an SEBC and provide them with reservations in public employment and higher education. The law was challenged, among other reasons, on the basis that the state did not have the power to recognise SEBCs after the 102nd Constitutional Amendment.

By a 3:2 majority, the Court agreed and struck down the law. According to the majority, the text of the Constitution is the primary source for interpreting it. So, even though parliamentary records indicated that there was no intention to take away the States' power to recognise SEBCs, the literal interpretation of the amended Constitution was that only the Union government had this power.

The judgment surprised the political community. Multiple state and national parties wanted States' powers to be restored. The Union government immediately asked the Court to review its decision, as this might result in many communities losing their SEBC status. However, on June 28, the Court passed an order dismissing the review petition. Following this, the Union government introduced the 127th Constitutional Amendment Bill in August, which would later become the 105th Constitutional Amendment Act.

== Legislative History ==
On 9 August 2021, the Minister for Social Justice and Empowerment, Dr. Virendra Kumar, introduced The Constitution (One Hundred and Twenty-seventh Amendment) Bill, 2021 in the Lok Sabha. The Objects and Reasons of the Bill states that it is being introduced to "adequately clarify that the State Government and Union territories are empowered to prepare and maintain their own State List/Union territory List of SEBCs". It also states that the "legislative intent at the time of passing of the Constitution (One Hundred and Second Amendment) Act, 2018 was that it deals with the Central List of the socially and educationally backward classes (SEBCs). It recognises the fact that even prior to the declaration of the Central List of SEBCs in 1993, many States/Union territories are having their own State List/Union territory List of OBCs."

The Bill was debated over the course of 10 August 2021. All Members of Parliament spoke in support of the Bill, using the opportunity to discuss various policies regarding SEBCs or OBCs. Many opposition parties particularly focused on demanding a Caste Census along with the 2022 Census of India. Some members sought an amendment that also removed the 50% limit on reservations that was reiterated in the Maratha Reservation Case. On the same day, the Bill was passed unanimously with 380 votes in favour and 0 against.

The Bill was then introduced in the Rajya Sabha on 11 August 2021. It was debated and passed on the same day, once again with unanimous support.

On 18 August 2021, the President gave his assent to the Bill, making it a law passed as the 105th Constitutional Amendment Act, 2021. The Act was published in the Gazette of India on 19 August 2021. On 15 September 2021, the Ministry of Law and Justice issued a notification which stated that the 105th Constitutional Amendment would be deemed to be in force from 15 August 2021.

=== Provisions ===
The Amendment added that SEBC will be defined for the purposes of the Central Government or the State or Union Territory as the case may be. Particularly, it added a clause stating that every State or Union Territory may have its own list of SEBCs which can be different from the Central List for its own purposes. It also stated that the National Commission for Backward Classes powers and responsibilities (including the requirement to be consulted on all policy matters and recognition of SEBCs) did not apply to the separate State lists. Effectively, this would mean that States do not need to consult the National Commission.

== Judicial Consideration ==
In February 2021, the Tamil Nadu state legislature introduced a law that sought to provide reservations for the Vanniyar community as a sub-classification within SEBCs. This was challenged on the basis that since it was passed before the 105th Constitutional Amendment Act, the state did not have the power to pass the law at the time. The state argued that the 105th Amendment was only clarifying the 102nd Amendment, and so it had retrospective effect. The Supreme Court disagreed, an amendment would not be considered retrospective unless it explicitly said so. The text of the 105th Amendment has no indication that it is retrospective. However, the Vanniyar reservation law only changed the quantum and classification of the community that was already recognised as an SEBC in 1994. So, it was not exercising a power of recognising SEBCs. States continued to hold the power to decide the quantum and nature of reservation.
