= 2006 Indian anti-reservation protests =

Protest in India against reservation for OBCs

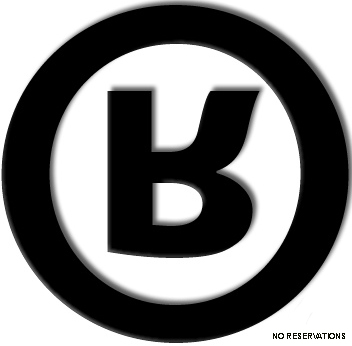
- No reservation symbol
- Date: 2006
- Location: India
- Caused by: Government of India's decision to implement reservations for the Other Backward Classes (OBCs) in central and private institutes of higher education

The 2006 Indian anti-reservation protests were a series of protests that took place in India in 2006 in opposition to the decision of the Union Government of India, led by the Indian National Congress-headed multiparty coalition United Progressive Alliance, to implement reservations for the Other Backward Classes (OBCs) in central and private institutes of higher education. These protests were one of the two major protests against the Indian reservation system, the other one being the 1990 anti-Mandal protests.

The government proposed to reserve 27% of seats in the premier educational institutions of India like All India Institute of Medical Sciences (AIIMS), Indian Institutes of Technology (IITs), National Institutes of Technology (NITs), Indian Institutes of Management (IIMs), Indian Institute of Science (IISc) and other central institutions of higher education for the OBCs in order to help them gain higher levels of representation in these institutions. This move led to massive protests, particularly from students and doctors belonging to the General Category, who claimed that the government's proposal was discriminatory, discarded meritocracy and was driven by vote-bank politics.

Medical students in Delhi took the lead and drew support from their counterparts in other cities, such as Mumbai, and IIT Roorkee students. The protesters organised themselves under the banner of Youth For Equality and demanded a rollback of the quota, a white paper on the reservation policy and alternative ways of affirmative action.

Finally, the protests ended when the Supreme Court of India upheld the reservations in its landmark judgement. On 10 April 2008, in the Ashoka Kumar Thakur v. Union of India case, the Supreme Court upheld the Ninety-third Constitutional Amendment and Central Educational Institutions(CEIs) (Reservation in Admission) Act, 2006, for the provision of 27% quota for candidates belonging to the Other Backward Classes in IITs, NITs, IIMs, AIIMS, IISc and other premier educational institutions. But it directed the government to exclude the "creamy layer", families whose annual salary in more than ₹4,50,000, among the OBCs while implementing the law. However, the "creamy layer" exclusion would not be applied to the Scheduled Castes & Scheduled Tribes (SC/STs).

== Historical background ==
=== Origin of reservation ===
India is divided into many endogamous groups i.e. castes and sub-castes, as a result of social stratification and presence of untouchability. During the British Raj, some methods for upliftment of these depressed classes were introduced by the British, progressive thinkers and Hindu reformers. These included reservations in the legislature and in government jobs. After independence, the Indian constitution introduced provisions for reservations for the Scheduled Castes and Tribes (SC/ST) in government institutions, to give a fair representation to the weakest sections of society i.e. Dalits and Adivasis. 22.5% of the seats (SC- 15%, ST- 7.5%) in higher education institutes and public sector undertakings at both state and central level were set-aside for them. Uplifting the SC/ST's representation par with the upper castes has not yet been achieved.

In 1989, the then-Prime Minister of India V. P. Singh accepted and implemented nationwide the proposals of the Mandal Commission, which had been established by the Morarji Desai-led Janata Party government in 1979. The proposals of this commission recommended 27% reservation for Other Backward Classes (OBCs) in public sector undertakings and state-level educational institutions. OBC's were a group of castes which fell in-between the upper castes and Dalits; they were historically not oppressed and socially boycotted as the Dalits and Adivasis, but were still socially, educationally and economically backward compared to the upper castes. Though some Indian states such as Tamil Nadu and Andhra Pradesh had already implemented the OBC reservations earlier in their higher educational institutions, this decision now forced every Indian state to implement OBC reservation. By combining this 27% quota for OBC's and the earlier 22.5% reservation for the SC/ST's, the percentage of general (unreserved) seats in any medical, engineering or other institute falling under the state government reduced to 50.5%. This included even the unaided private colleges. As a result, there was widespread protests from the students belonging to the unreserved category (forward castes), claiming that they were being discriminated and that merit was being discarded.

=== Extension of 27% reservation ===
On 5 April 2006, Congress leader and then-Human Resource Development Minister Arjun Singh, promised to implement a 27% reservation for OBCs in institutes of higher education (twenty central universities, the IITs, NITs, IIMs, AIIMS, IISc) after the State Assembly elections in Tamil Nadu, Kerala, Puducherry, Assam and West Bengal, in accordance with the 93rd Constitutional Amendment, which was passed unanimously by both Houses of Parliament. The 93rd Constitutional Amendment allows the government to make special provisions for the "advancement of any socially and educationally backward classes of citizens", including their admission in aided or unaided private educational institutions. Gradually this reservation policy is to be implemented in private sector institutions and companies as well. Private sector institutions and companies had never come under the purview of reservation.

The text of the 93rd amendment reads-

Greater access to higher education including professional education, is of great importance to a large number of students belonging to the Scheduled Castes, the Scheduled Tribes and other socially and educationally backward classes of citizens. The reservation of seats for the Scheduled Castes, the Scheduled Tribes and the Other Backward Classes of citizens in admission to educational institution is derived from the provisions of clause(4) of article 15 of the constitution. At present, the number of seats available in aided or State maintained institutions, particularly in respect of professional education, is limited, in comparison to those in private aided institutions.

Clause(i) of article 30 of the Constitution provides the right to all minorities to establish and administer educational institutions of their choice. It is essential that the rights available to minorities are protected in regard to institutions established and administered by them. Accordingly, institutions declared by the State to be minority institutions under clause(1) of article 30 are excluded from the operation of this enactment.

To promote the educational advancement of the socially and educationally backward classes of citizens, i.e., the Other Backward Classes or of the Scheduled Castes and the Scheduled Tribes in matters of admission of students belonging to these categories in unaided educational institutions, other than the minority educational institutions referred to in clause (1) of article 30, the provisions of article 15 were amplified. The new clause (5) of said article 15 shall enable the Parliament as well as the State legislatures to make appropriate laws for the above mentioned purpose.

This move led to opposition from students, as the proposal would reduce seats for the general category from the existing 77.5% to less than 51% (since members of OBCs are also allowed to contest in the General category), despite assurance from the government that the number of seats in these educational institutes will be increased so that effectively there will be no reduction in the number of seats available for the general category. The opposing students also felt that the government's move was merely to placate and consolidate the OBC vote bank. The private sector organisations too opposed the move, saying it would impede merit and reduce the competitiveness of the students.

== Events ==
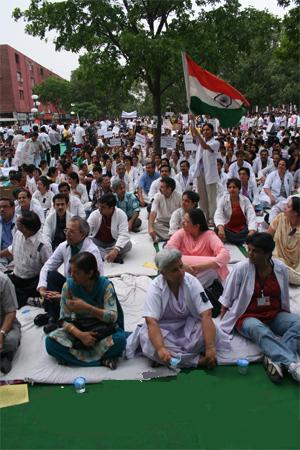
Doctors protesting against reservation at Jantar Mantar, Delhi

The protests began from 26 April 2006 with medical students protesting in New Delhi against the government's proposal, where students were lathi-charged and water cannons and tear gas were fired on the students. Another such protest was carried out by medical students in New Delhi on 13 May 2006 where students were again lathi-charged and detained for few hours. Medical students held a protest in Mumbai on 14 May 2006, where students were lathi-charged, despite the protest being banned by the Bombay High Court. They were lathi-charged by the police. In retaliation of the police action toward the anti-reservation protestors, a nationwide strike was launched by the "anti-reservation" medical students. Doctors from all over India who opposed the government's proposal too joined the protest.

The government took measures to counter the protesting doctors by serving them with suspension letters and asking them to vacate the hostels to make way for newly recruited doctors. Some states invoked the Essential Services Maintenance Act (ESMA) and gave notices to the doctors to return to work, failing which legal action would be taken against them. The government also put on alert 6,000 men from the Rapid Action Force to take care of any untoward incident. However, in most places the protesters remained defiant despite ESMA. Most forward caste students across India took to the streets, boycotting classes. In Delhi, a human chain rally was organized on 20 May by the students of IIT Delhi with the support of PanIIT, the IIT alumni organisation, to protest the OBC reservation. Nearly 150 students of New Delhi's 5 Medical Colleges went on a 'relay' hunger strike in AIIMS which lasted for about a month.

A resolution signed by 2,500 IIT Roorkee students expressing their opposition to the OBC reservation, was sent to the then-President Abdul Kalam, the Prime Minister Manmohan Singh, the then-Chief Justice of India Y. K. Sabharwal and the Election Commission of India. A peaceful protest march was then organised by them on 23 May. Many anti-reservation protesters now began to group under the aegis of Youth For Equality. The following were the demands made by "Youth For Equality"-

Roll back of the proposed hike in reservations.

Setting up of an academic, non-political panel of experts to review the existing reservation policy and explore alternate forms of affirmative action.

Vacant positions in reserved government jobs to be thrown open for other eligible candidates.

No penal action be taken against the protesters.

A white paper issued on the reservation policy and a concrete statement on the issue by the Prime Minister.

After the government reaffirmed its commitment to implementing reservations, the protesters called for a "Civil disobedience movement". Their protests were also supported by the traders in Delhi, who threatened to shut shops if the government didn't roll back on its decision to extend the OBC reservation. The AIIMS Faculty Association went on a mass casual leave from 25 May 2006 to support the anti-quota stir, but made it clear that basic health-care services would not be disrupted. However, whether health care services were really unaffected is questionable. On 27 May 2006, a massive rally was organised in Delhi. The rally was attended by participants from all over India, numbering almost 100,000. It was declared that the strike by students and junior doctors would continue.

On 28 May 2006, the government set up an Oversight Committee to "prepare a road map with a time-bound programme to implement 27% reservation for OBCs without compromising merit and addressing apprehensions aired by students propose an effective way to implement reservations keeping the interests of all sections of society in mind". This committee, headed by Union Minister and former Karnataka Chief Minister M. Veerappa Moily, would submit its report by 31 August 2006.

On 31 May 2006, in deference to the Supreme Court directive, resident doctors resumed hospital works from 1 June 2006, as the health service was affected seriously due to the strike. However, protest from the part of students (both medical and other streams) continued and a national coordination committee comprising representatives of medical colleges, IITs and several other educational institutions had been proposed to be formed to lead the agitation. The Supreme Court has also sought the government to clarify the basis on which the reservation policy was being implemented. However, these protests slowly died down and eventually ended.

== Political reactions and opinions ==
CPI(ML) poster in Kottayam, calling for expanded quotas for lower castes, including private sector

The 93rd Constitutional Amendment was passed unanimously in the Lok Sabha except for two abstaining members. Barring a few, most of the political parties supported the move to extend the OBC reservation to premier educational institutions.

=== Supporting parties ===
- The parliamentary left parties, while supporting reservations, called for excluding the "creamy layer" from availing of its benefits; the "creamy layer" is used in reference to members of economically advanced population belonging to any caste.
- The Bharatiya Janata Party (BJP) also supported the reservations, but called for upholding merit and excellence in educational institutes. They asked for the benefits of reservation to be extended to "economically weaker sections of the forward castes", and also for exclusion of the "creamy layer". The student wing of the Hindu nationalist organisation Rashtriya Swayamsevak Sangh, Akhil Bharatiya Vidyarthi Parishad too supported the reservation for OBC's, hailing them as a "historic need", but they also called for exclusion of the "creamy layer".
- The Congress, which introduced these quotas, vociferously backed them. Congress workers allegedly confronted the fasting doctors at AIIMS. They were headed by Sacchar Singh, a relative of Arjun Singh. They proceeded with heavy slogan-shouting. It almost became a show-down between both camps; however, the police managed to stop these workers.
- The Bahujan Samaj Party (BSP), a pro-Dalit party, urged the Union Government to ban the strike by the anti-reservation students and go ahead with its decision to provide reservation for the Other Backward Classes in higher education.
- The Dravidian parties of Tamil Nadu supported the move and demanded that the OBC reservation quotas be implemented without any delay. They called upon the government to pay no heed to the anti-reservation protestors. The Pattali Makkal Katchi (PMK), a key constituent of the Dravida Munnetra Kazhagam (DMK)-led alliance in Tamil Nadu, went to the extent of organising a pro-reservation protest march in Chennai.
- The Rashtriya Janata Dal (RJD) of Lalu Prasad Yadav openly supported the OBC reservation proposal and requested the UPA not to reconsider or delay it.
- The Janata Dal (United) (JD(U)) too supported the OBC quotas and said that granting of facilities to SCs, STs and OBCs for higher education had become a subject of "unnecessary debate".
- The Samajwadi Party condemned the anti-reservation protests, and said that the attitude of the protesting students toward reservation was wrong.

=== Opposing parties ===
- The only political party which opposed the OBC reservation was the Marathi nationalist party Shiv Sena. Its supporters went on a procession in Mumbai to protest the move saying it was vote bank politics and a means to divide Hinduism.

== Aftermath ==
On 10 April 2008, in the Ashoka Kumar Thakur v. Union of India case, the Supreme Court of India upheld the 93rd Constitutional Amendment and Central Educational Institutions(CEIs) (Reservation in Admission) Act, 2006, for the provision of 27% quota for candidates belonging to the Other Backward Classes in IITs, NITs, IIMs, AIIMS, IISc and other premier educational institutions. But it directed the government to exclude the "creamy layer", families whose annual salary in more than ₹4,50,000, among the OBCs while implementing the law. However, the "creamy layer" exclusion would not be applied to the SC/STs.

== See also ==
- Forward Castes
- Other Backward Class
- Reservation in India
- Mandal Commission
- Mandal Commission protests of 1990
- V. P. Singh
- Arjun Singh
