= Constitutional body (India) =

Body or institution established directly by the Constitution of India

In India, a constitutional body is a body or institution established directly by a provision of the Constitution of India, as distinct from a statutory body created by an ordinary Act of Parliament or a non-statutory executive body created by a government resolution. Because their existence and powers derive from the constitutional text itself, altering, abolishing, or fundamentally restructuring a constitutional body generally requires a constitutional amendment rather than a simple legislative change.

The members of the Constituent Assembly of India recognized the need for institutions that could regulate matters of national importance with a degree of insulation from executive control. Accordingly, several provisions were written into the Constitution establishing bodies such as the Election Commission of India, the Comptroller and Auditor General of India, and the Union Public Service Commission. Some of these bodies enjoy security of tenure and removal procedures modelled on those for judges of the Supreme Court of India; for instance, the Chief Election Commissioner and the Comptroller and Auditor General can be removed only through a process resembling judicial impeachment, requiring an address by each House of Parliament supported by a majority of the total membership and by two-thirds of members present and voting. Not every constitutional body has such protections; several — including bodies created by amendment, such as the National Commission for Backward Classes — have removal procedures set out in ordinary legislation made under the relevant constitutional provision, and a small number of listed provisions are enabling powers that Parliament or the President has never exercised.

Constitutional bodies are commonly distinguished from statutory bodies, such as the National Human Rights Commission, which are created by an Act of Parliament and can be altered or abolished by ordinary legislation, and from non-statutory bodies such as NITI Aayog, which are set up by executive resolution alone.

== List of constitutional bodies ==
The following table lists provisions of the Constitution that establish, or provide for the establishment of, a body or office. Entries marked in the Notes column as "provision not exercised" refer to enabling powers that have not, to date, resulted in an actual standing body.

Article	Body or office	Notes
76	Attorney General of India	Chief law officer of the Union
148	Comptroller and Auditor General of India	
165	Advocate General for the State	Chief law officer of a state
243-I	State Finance Commission	Constituted every five years by each state governor
243K	State Election Commission	Superintends elections to panchayats
243ZD	District Planning Committee	Consolidates plans prepared by panchayats and municipalities in a district
243ZE	Metropolitan Planning Committee	Constituted in metropolitan areas
263	Inter-State Council	
279A	Goods and Services Tax Council	Added by the 101st Amendment, 2016
280	Finance Commission	Constituted every five years by the President
307	Authority for inter-state trade and commerce	Enabling provision only; no such authority has been constituted by Parliament as of 2026
315–323	Union Public Service Commission and State Public Service Commissions	
324	Election Commission of India	
338	National Commission for Scheduled Castes	
338A	National Commission for Scheduled Tribes	
338B	National Commission for Backward Classes	Added by the 102nd Amendment, 2018
339	Commission on administration of Scheduled Areas	President may appoint at any time; not a permanent standing body
340	Commission on backward classes	President may appoint at his discretion (e.g. the Kalelkar Commission, Mandal Commission); not a permanent standing body
350B	Special Officer for Linguistic Minorities	Currently designated Commissioner for Linguistic Minorities; the Constitution specifies no tenure, qualifications, or removal procedure for the office

== See also ==
- List of central agencies in India
- Constitution of India

== Bibliography ==
- Laxmikanth, M (2020). Indian Polity (sixth ed.). Chennai, India: McGraw Hill Education. ISBN 978-93-5260-363-3.
