= Ministry of Social Justice and Empowerment =

Government ministry of India

- Branch of Government of India

Agency overview
- Jurisdiction: Government of India
- Headquarters: Ministry of Social Justice and Empowerment Shastri Bhawan, C-Wing, Dr. Rajendra Prasad Road New Delhi,110011 New Delhi
- Annual budget: ₹6,908 crore (US$720 million) (2017–18 est.)
- Ministers responsible: Virendra Kumar Khatik, Cabinet Minister; Ramdas Athawale, Minister of State; B. L. Verma, Minister of State
- Website: socialjustice.gov.in सामाजिकन्यायऔरअधिकारितामंत्रालय.सरकार.भारत

The Ministry of Social Justice and Empowerment is a Government of India ministry. It is responsible for welfare, social justice and empowerment of disadvantaged and marginalised sections of society, including scheduled castes (SC), Other Backward Classes (OBC), LGBT people, the disabled, the elderly, and the victims of drug abuse. It also helps in the enforcement of legislation with regards to these marginalized groups to better enforce anti-discrimination policies.

The Minister of Social Justice and Empowerment holds cabinet rank as a member of the Council of Ministers. The current minister is Virendra Kumar, who is assisted by two ministers of state, Ramdas Athawale and B. L. Verma.

== History ==
In 1985–1986, the former Ministry of Welfare was divided into the Department of Women and Child Development and the Department of Welfare. At the same time, the Departments of Scheduled Castes Development, Tribal Development, and Minorities and Backward Classes Welfare of the Ministry of Home Affairs and the Department of Wakf of the Ministry of Law were separated from those ministry to form the new Ministry of Welfare.

The Ministry of Welfare was renamed as the Ministry of Social Justice and Empowerment in May 1998. In October 1999, the Department of Tribal Development was separated to form the new and independent Ministry of Tribal Affairs. In May 2004 following the formation of the First Manmohan Singh ministry, the Department of Women and Child Development was separated to form an independent ministry to be known as the Ministry of Women and Child Development, while in January 2006, the Departments of Minorities Welfare and the Wakf were separated to form the Ministry of Minority Affairs. To propagate the ideologies and philosophy of Babu Jagjivan Ram, the Babu Jagjivan Ram National Foundation has been set up by the Ministry.

In 2012, the Union Minister of Social Justice and Empowerment launched Oblindia, an online library for visually impaired college students. At launch, the library included 12,000 books in 10 languages.

== Organisation ==
The ministry has five bureaus, each headed by a Joint Secretary: Scheduled Castes Development Bureau; Backward Classes Bureau Coordination, Media, Administration; Disability Bureau; Social Defense (SD) Bureau; and Project, Research, Evaluation and Monitoring Bureau.

- Statutory Bodies
  - Office of the Chief Commissioner for Persons with Disabilities, New Delhi
  - National Trust for the Welfare of Persons with Autism, Cerebral Palsy, Mental Retardation and Multiple Disabilities
  - Rehabilitation Council of India (RCI)
  - Development and Welfare Board for Denotified, Nomadic and Semi Nomadic Communities (DWBDNC)
- Commissions
  - National Commission for Backward Classes
  - National Commission for Scheduled Castes
  - National Commission for Scheduled Tribes
  - National Commission for Denotified, Nomadic and Semi-Nomadic Tribes
  - National Commission for Safai Karamcharis
- Adjunct Body
  - National Board of Examination in Rehabilitation
- National Institutes
  - Ali Yavar Jung National Institute for the Hearing Handicapped, Mumbai (AYJNIHH)
  - Deendayal Upadhyaya Institute for the Physically Handicapped, New Delhi (formerly Institute for the Physically Handicapped (IPH))
  - National Institute for Locomotor Disabilities, Kolkata
  - National Institute for the Empowerment of Persons with Intellectual Disabilities, Secunderabad
  - National Institute for the Empowerment of Persons with Visual Disabilities (NIVH), Dehradun
  - Swami Vivekanand National Institute of Rehabilitation Training and Research, Cuttack (NIRTAR)
  - National Institute for Empowerment of Persons with Multiple Disabilities (NIEPMD), Chennai
  - Indian Sign Language Research & Training Centre (ISLRTC)
  - National Institute of Social Defence (NISD)
  - Atal Bihari Training centre for Disability Sports, Gwalior, Madhaya Pradesh
- Public sector undertakings
  - National Backward Classes Finance and Development Corporation (NBCFDC)
  - National Divyangjan Finance and Development Corporation (NHFDC)
  - Artificial Limbs Manufacturing Corporation of India (ALIMCO), Kanpur
  - National Scheduled Castes Finance and Development Corporation
  - National Safai Karamcharis Finance & Development Corporation
- Composite Regional Centres for Persons with Disabilities (CRCs)
- Public Private Partnership
  - Indian Spinal Injury Centre

=== Think Tank ===
- Dr. Ambedkar International Centre, New Delhi

== Legislation ==
- Maintenance and Welfare of Parents and Senior Citizens Act, 2007

== Cabinet Ministers ==
- Note: MoS, I/C – Minister of State (Independent Charge)

No.	Portrait	Minister (Birth-Death) Constituency	Term of office			Political party	Ministry	Prime Minister
No.	Portrait	Minister (Birth-Death) Constituency	From	To	Period	Political party	Ministry	Prime Minister
Minister of Social Security
1		Ram Subhag Singh (1917–1980); MP for Bikramganj (MoS)	9 June 1964	13 June 1964	4 days	Indian National Congress	Shastri	Lal Bahadur Shastri
2		Ashoke Kumar Sen (1913–1996); MP for Calcutta North West	13 June 1964	11 January 1966	1 year, 212 days	Indian National Congress	Shastri	Lal Bahadur Shastri
2		Ashoke Kumar Sen (1913–1996); MP for Calcutta North West	11 January 1966	24 January 1966	1 year, 212 days	Indian National Congress	Nanda II	Gulzarilal Nanda
Minister of Social Welfare
3		Kotha Raghuramaiah (1912–1979); MP for Guntur (MoS)	24 January 1966	25 March 1966	60 days	Indian National Congress	Indira I	Indira Gandhi
4		Asoka Mehta (1911–1984); Rajya Sabha MP for Maharashtra, until 1967; MP for Bhandara	25 March 1966	13 March 1967	2 years, 150 days	Indian National Congress	Indira I	Indira Gandhi
4		Asoka Mehta (1911–1984); Rajya Sabha MP for Maharashtra, until 1967; MP for Bhandara	13 March 1967	22 August 1968	2 years, 150 days	Indian National Congress	Indira II	Indira Gandhi
5		Panampilly Govinda Menon (1906–1970); MP for Mukundapuram	22 August 1968	23 May 1970	1 year, 274 days	Indian National Congress	Indira II	Indira Gandhi
6		Kengal Hanumanthaiah (1908–1980); MP for Bangalore City	26 May 1970	18 March 1971	296 days	Indian National Congress (R)	Indira II	Indira Gandhi
7		Siddhartha Shankar Ray (1920–2010); MP for Raiganj	18 March 1971	20 March 1972	1 year, 2 days	Indian National Congress (R)	Indira III	Indira Gandhi
8		Saiyid Nurul Hasan (1921–1993); Rajya Sabha MP for Uttar Pradesh (MoS, I/C)	24 March 1972	24 March 1977	5 years, 0 days	Indian National Congress (R)	Indira III	Indira Gandhi
9		Pratap Chandra Chunder (1919–2008); MP for Calcutta North East	24 March 1977	28 July 1979	2 years, 126 days	Janata Party	Desai	Morarji Desai
10		Karan Singh (born 1931); MP for Udhampur	28 July 1979	19 August 1979	22 days	Indian National Congress (Urs)	Charan	Charan Singh
11		Sathiavani Muthu (1923–1999); Rajya Sabha MP for Tamil Nadu	19 August 1979	23 December 1979	126 days	All India Anna Dravida Munnetra Kazhagam	Charan	Charan Singh
12		Shankarrao Chavan (1920–2004); MP for Nanded	19 October 1980	8 August 1981	293 days	Indian National Congress (I)	Indira IV	Indira Gandhi
13		Sheila Kaul (1915–2015); MP for Lucknow (MoS, I/C)	8 August 1981	31 October 1984	3 years, 140 days	Indian National Congress (I)	Indira IV	Indira Gandhi
13		Sheila Kaul (1915–2015); MP for Lucknow (MoS, I/C)	4 November 1984	31 December 1984	3 years, 140 days	Indian National Congress (I)	Rajiv I	Rajiv Gandhi
Minister of Women and Social Welfare
14		Maragatham Chandrasekar (1917–2001); MP for Sriperumbudur (MoS, I/C)	31 December 1984	25 September 1985	268 days	Indian National Congress (I)	Rajiv II	Rajiv Gandhi
15		Rajendra Kumari Bajpai (1925–1999); MP for Sitapur (MoS, I/C)	25 September 1985	2 December 1989	4 years, 68 days	Indian National Congress (I)	Rajiv II	Rajiv Gandhi
Minister of Welfare
16		Ram Vilas Paswan (1946–2020); MP for Hajipur	6 December 1989	10 November 1990	1 year, 4 days	Janata Dal	Vishwanath	Vishwanath Pratap Singh
–		Chandra Shekhar (1927–2007); MP for Ballia (Prime Minister)	21 November 1990	21 June 1991	212 days	Samajwadi Janata Party (Rashtriya)	Chandra Shekhar	Chandra Shekhar
17		Sitaram Kesri (1919–2000); Rajya Sabha MP for Bihar	21 June 1991	16 May 1996	4 years, 330 days	Indian National Congress (I)	Rao	P. V. Narasimha Rao
18		Kariya Munda (born 1936); MP for Khunti	16 May 1996	1 June 1996	16 days	Bharatiya Janata Party	Vajpayee I	Atal Bihari Vajpayee
19		Balwant Singh Ramoowalia (born 1942); Rajya Sabha MP for Uttar Pradesh	1 June 1996	21 April 1997	1 year, 291 days	Independent	Deve Gowda	H. D. Deve Gowda
19		Balwant Singh Ramoowalia (born 1942); Rajya Sabha MP for Uttar Pradesh	21 April 1997	19 March 1998	1 year, 291 days	Independent	Gujral	Inder Kumar Gujral
20		Maneka Gandhi (born 1956); MP for Pilibhit (MoS, I/C)	19 March 1998	23 May 1998	65 days	Independent	Vajpayee II	Atal Bihari Vajpayee
Minister of Social Justice and Empowerment
21		Maneka Gandhi (born 1956); MP for Pilibhit (MoS, I/C)	23 May 1998	13 October 1999	3 years, 101 days	Independent	Vajpayee II	Atal Bihari Vajpayee
21		Maneka Gandhi (born 1956); MP for Pilibhit (MoS, I/C)	13 October 1999	1 September 2001	3 years, 101 days	Independent	Vajpayee III	Atal Bihari Vajpayee
22		Satyanarayan Jatiya (born 1946); MP for Ujjain	1 September 2001	22 May 2004	2 years, 264 days	Bharatiya Janata Party	Vajpayee III	Atal Bihari Vajpayee
23		Meira Kumar (born 1945); MP for Sasaram	23 May 2004	28 May 2009	5 years, 5 days	Indian National Congress	Manmohan I	Manmohan Singh
24		Mukul Wasnik (born 1959); MP for Ramtek	28 May 2009	27 October 2012	3 years, 152 days	Indian National Congress	Manmohan II	Manmohan Singh
26		Selja Kumari (born 1962); MP for Ambala	28 October 2012	28 January 2014	1 year, 92 days	Indian National Congress	Manmohan II	Manmohan Singh
27		Mallikarjun Kharge (born 1941); MP for Gulbarga	28 January 2014	26 May 2014	118 days	Indian National Congress	Manmohan II	Manmohan Singh
28		Thawar Chand Gehlot (born 1948); Rajya Sabha MP for Madhya Pradesh	27 May 2014	30 May 2019	7 years, 41 days	Bharatiya Janata Party	Modi I	Narendra Modi
28		Thawar Chand Gehlot (born 1948); Rajya Sabha MP for Madhya Pradesh	31 May 2019	7 July 2021	7 years, 41 days	Bharatiya Janata Party	Modi II	Narendra Modi
29		Virendra Kumar Khatik (born 1954); MP for Tikamgarh	7 July 2021	9 June 2024	5 years, 45 days	Bharatiya Janata Party	Modi II	Narendra Modi
29		Virendra Kumar Khatik (born 1954); MP for Tikamgarh	10 June 2024	Incumbent	5 years, 45 days	Bharatiya Janata Party	Modi III	Narendra Modi

== Ministers of State ==
No.	Portrait	Minister (Birth-Death) Constituency	Term of office			Political party	Ministry	Prime Minister
No.	Portrait	Minister (Birth-Death) Constituency	From	To	Period	Political party	Ministry	Prime Minister
Minister of State of Social Security
1		Ramchandra Martand Hajarnavis (1908–1976); MP for Bhandara	29 October 1965	11 January 1966	74 days	Indian National Congress	Shastri	Lal Bahadur Shastri
Minister of State of Social Welfare
2		Phulrenu Guha (1912–2006); Rajya Sabha MP for West Bengal	13 March 1967	26 June 1970	3 years, 105 days	Indian National Congress	Indira II	Indira Gandhi
3		Kotha Raghuramaiah (1912–1979); MP for Guntur	18 March 1967	14 February 1969	1 year, 333 days	Indian National Congress	Indira II	Indira Gandhi
4		Jagannath Rao; MP for Chatrapur	27 June 1970	18 March 1971	264 days	Indian National Congress (R)	Indira II	Indira Gandhi
5		Saiyid Nurul Hasan (1921–1993); Rajya Sabha MP for Uttar Pradesh	4 October 1971	24 March 1972	172 days	Indira III		Indira Gandhi
6		Dhanna Singh Gulshan; MP for Bathinda	14 August 1977	28 July 1979	1 year, 348 days	Janata Party	Desai	Morarji Desai
7		Renuka Devi Barkataki (1932–2017); MP for Gauhati	16 August 1977	28 July 1979	1 year, 346 days	Janata Party	Desai	Morarji Desai
8		Rashida Haque Choudhury; MP for Silchar	30 July 1979	24 August 1979	25 days	Indian National Congress (Urs)	Charan	Charan Singh
9		Sheila Kaul (1915–2015); MP for Lucknow	19 October 1980	8 August 1981	293 days	Indian National Congress (I)	Indira IV	Indira Gandhi
Minister of State for Welfare
10		Aslam Sher Khan (born 1953); MP for Betul	15 September 1995	16 May 1996	244 days	Indian National Congress (I)	Rao	P. V. Narasimha Rao
Minister of State for Social Justice and Empowerment
11		Satyabrata Mookherjee (1932–2023); MP for Krishnanagar	1 July 2002	29 January 2003	212 days	Bharatiya Janata Party	Vajpayee III	Atal Bihari Vajpayee
12		Sanjay Paswan (born 1962); MP for Nawada	29 January 2003	24 May 2003	115 days	Bharatiya Janata Party	Vajpayee III	Atal Bihari Vajpayee
13		Kailash Chandra Meghwal (born 1934); MP for Tonk	24 May 2003	22 May 2004	364 days	Bharatiya Janata Party	Vajpayee III	Atal Bihari Vajpayee
14		Nagmani (born 1953); MP for Chatra	24 May 2003	22 May 2004	364 days	Bharatiya Janata Party	Vajpayee III	Atal Bihari Vajpayee
15		Subbulakshmi Jagadeesan (born 1947); MP for Tiruchengode	23 May 2004	22 May 2009	4 years, 364 days	Dravida Munnetra Kazhagam	Manmohan I	Manmohan Singh
16		Napoleon (born 1963); MP for Perambalur	28 May 2009	20 March 2013	3 years, 296 days	Dravida Munnetra Kazhagam	Manmohan II	Manmohan Singh
17		Porika Balram Naik (born 1964); MP for Mahabubabad	28 October 2012	26 May 2014	1 year, 210 days	Indian National Congress	Manmohan II	Manmohan Singh
18		Manikrao Hodlya Gavit (1934–2022); MP for Nandurbar	17 June 2013	26 May 2014	343 days	Indian National Congress	Manmohan II	Manmohan Singh
19		Sudarshan Bhagat (born 1969); MP for Lohardaga	27 May 2014	9 November 2014	166 days	Bharatiya Janata Party	Modi I	Narendra Modi
20		Krishan Pal Gurjar (born 1957); MP for Faridabad	9 November 2014	30 May 2019	4 years, 202 days	Bharatiya Janata Party	Modi I	Narendra Modi
21		Vijay Sampla (born 1961); MP for Hoshiarpur	9 November 2014	30 May 2019	4 years, 202 days	Bharatiya Janata Party	Modi I	Narendra Modi
22		Ramdas Athawale (born 1959); Rajya Sabha MP for Maharashtra	5 July 2016	30 May 2019	2 years, 329 days	Republican Party of India (Athawale)	Modi I	Narendra Modi
(20)		Krishan Pal Gurjar (born 1957); MP for Faridabad	31 May 2019	7 July 2021	2 years, 37 days	Bharatiya Janata Party	Modi II	Narendra Modi
(22)		Ramdas Athawale (born 1959); Rajya Sabha MP for Maharashtra	31 May 2019	9 June 2024	5 years, 9 days	Republican Party of India (Athawale)	Modi II	Narendra Modi
23		Rattan Lal Kataria (1951–2023); MP for Ambala	31 May 2019	7 July 2021	2 years, 37 days	Bharatiya Janata Party	Modi II	Narendra Modi
24		A. Narayanaswamy (born 1957); MP for Chitradurga	7 July 2021	9 June 2024	2 years, 338 days	Bharatiya Janata Party	Modi II	Narendra Modi
25		Pratima Bhoumik (born 1969); MP for Tripura West	7 July 2021	9 June 2024	2 years, 338 days	Bharatiya Janata Party	Modi II	Narendra Modi
(22)		Ramdas Athawale (born 1959); Rajya Sabha MP for Maharashtra	11 June 2024	Incumbent	2 years, 71 days	Republican Party of India (Athawale)	Modi III	Narendra Modi
26		B. L. Verma (born 1961); Rajya Sabha MP for Uttar Pradesh	11 June 2024	Incumbent	2 years, 71 days	Bharatiya Janata Party	Modi III	Narendra Modi

== See also ==
- National Award for the Empowerment of Persons with Disabilities
- Department of Adi Dravidar and Tribal Welfare (Tamil Nadu)
- Department of Backward Classes, Most Backward Classes and Minorities Welfare (Tamil Nadu)
- Reservation in India
