= National Backward Classes Finance and Development Corporation =

Indian non-profit organization

National Backward Classes Finance & Development Corporation (NBCFDC) was incorporated 13 January 1992 as a non profit company under the Ministry of Social Justice and Empowerment, Government of India to improve and develop the economic activities for the members of Backward Classes who are living below double the poverty line.

The corporation can assist loan for their self-employment ventures in the sectors like agriculture, transport and service etc. NBCFDC also provides Micro Financing through SCAs/ Self Help Groups (SHGs). The corporation can assist a wide range of income generating activities to assist the poorer section of these classes in skill development and self-employment ventures under following broad sectors.

== See also ==
- National Scheduled Castes Finance and Development Corporation
