= National Institute for the Empowerment of Persons with Visual Disabilities =

Blindness organization based in India

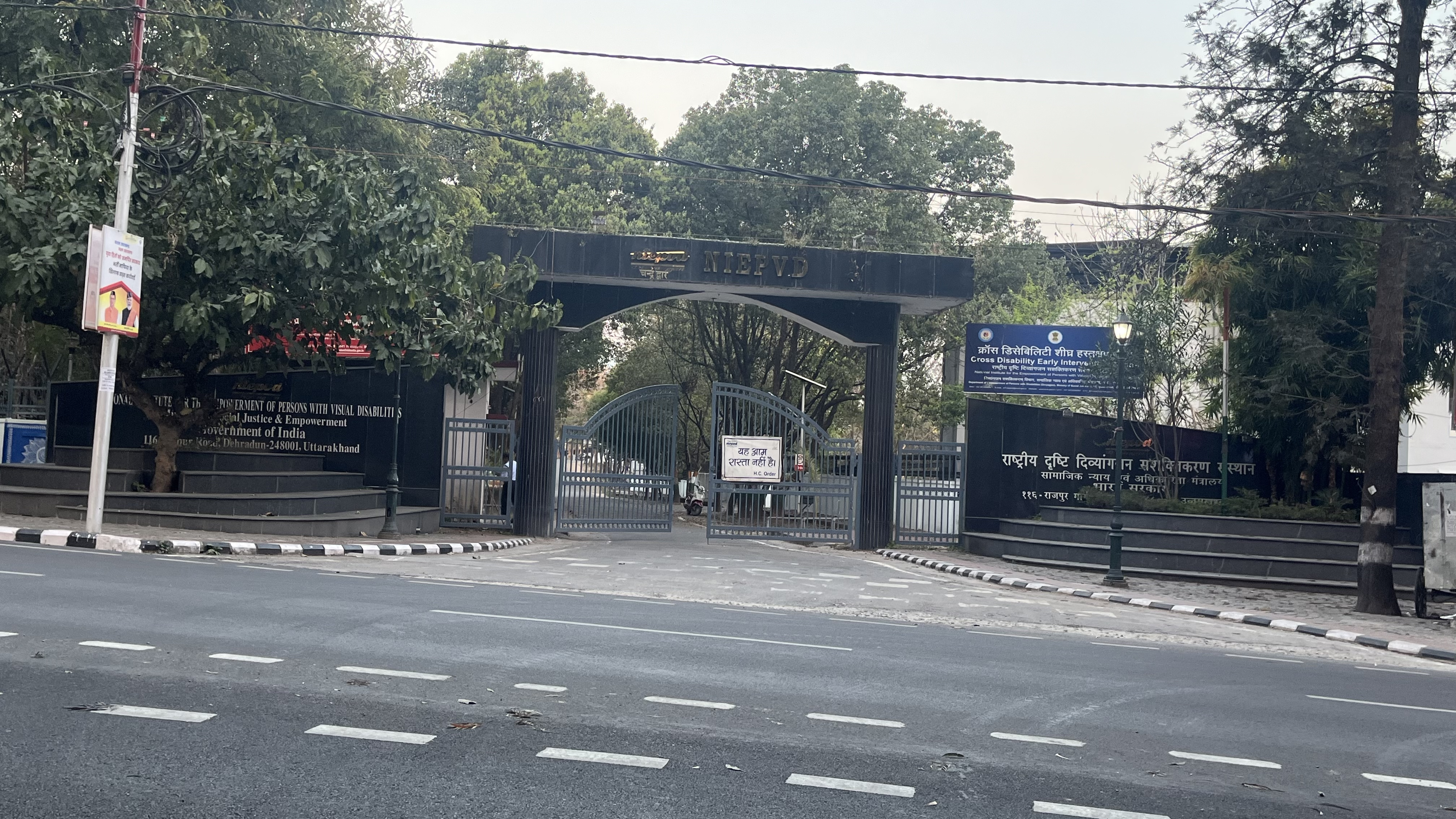
Entrance of NIPEVD

National Institute for the Empowerment of Persons with Visual Disabilities (Divyangjan), Dehradun (formerly known as National Institute for the Visually Handicapped) is a premier organisation under the administrative control of Department of Empowerment of Persons with Disabilities (Divyangjan), Ministry of Social Justice and Empowerment, Government of India. The institute is a training centre for the blind, located in an area of about 43 acres on Mussoorie-Dehradun Highway. It is also engaged in production of Braille literature, aids and appliances for visually disabled people. It also undertakes research and developmental activities ensuring emergence of disability inclusive policies, programmes and practices. The institute is governed by the Management & Advisory Bodies.

== Organisation, aims and objectives ==
The aims and objectives of the NIVH as stated in the Memorandum of Association are as follows:

- To conduct, sponsor, co-ordinate and/or subsidize research in collaboration with other NGOs and research organizations including Universities into various dimensions of the education and rehabilitation of the visually impaired.
- To undertake, sponsor, co-ordinate or subsidise research into biomedical engineering leading to the effective evaluation of special appliances/instruments or suitable surgical or medical procedures or the development of new special appliances/instruments.
- To undertake or sponsor the training of trainees and various specialized professionals including Teachers, Employment Officers, Psychologists, Vocational Counsellors and such other personnel as deemed necessary.
- To distribute, promote, or subsidise the manufacture of prototypes and to manage distribution of any or all devices designed to promote any aspect of the education, rehabilitation or employment of the Visually Impaired.

Departments:

- Special Education and Research
- Skill Development (TCAB)
- Model School
- National Accessible Library
- Rehabilitation Psychology & Research
- Technology Application & Research
- Braille Development

== History ==
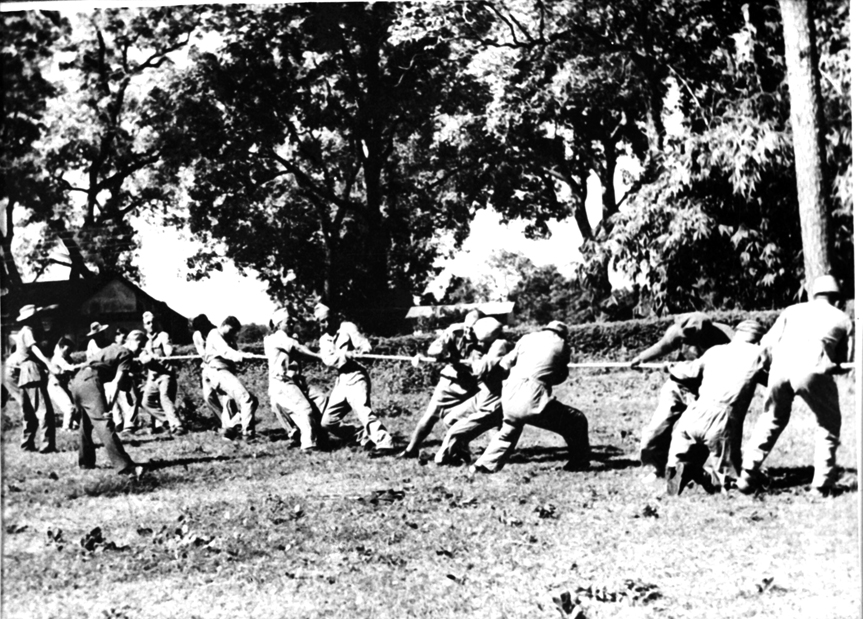
Blind persons at the Training Centre for the Adult Blind at Dehradun play Tug-of-War, 1951

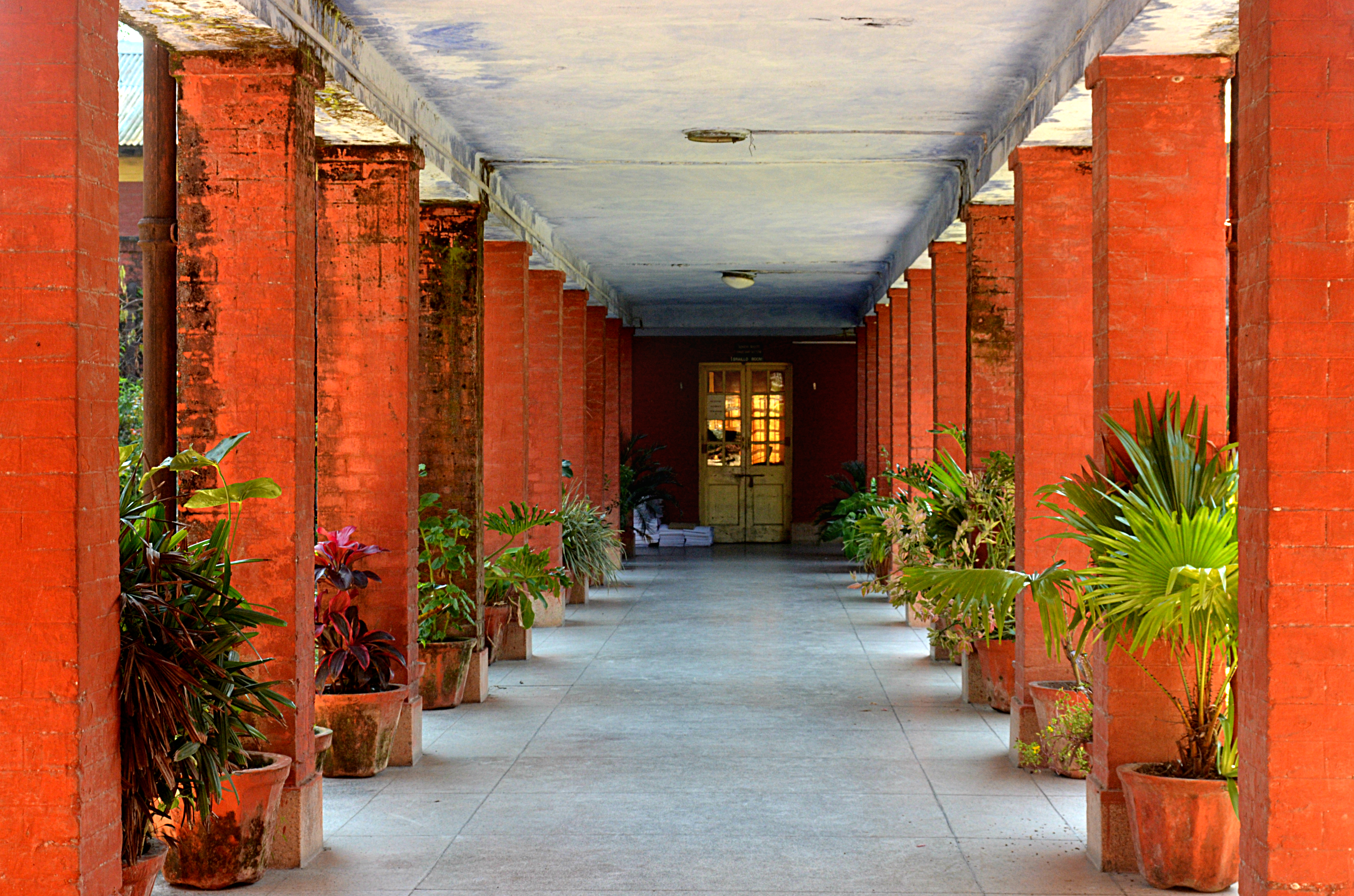
Central Braille Press, Dehradun

The first institution was the St. Dunstan's Hostel for Indian War Blinded established by St. Dunstan of London in 1943, which offered a basic set of rehabilitation services to the soldiers and sailors blinded in the World War II. In 1950, the Government of India took over the St. Dunstan's Hostel and entrusted the Ministry of Education with the responsibility of developing comprehensive services for the rehabilitation of blind persons. In the same year, the Government established the Training Centre for the Adult Blind to ensure reintegration of blind soldiers including other persons in the world of work. In 1951, the Government established Central Braille Press; in 1952, Workshop for the manufacturing of Braille Appliances; in 1954, Sheltered Workshop; in 1975 Training Centre for the Adult Blind Women and in 1959, Model School for the Visually Handicapped. In 1963, National Library for the Print Handicapped was established out of which National Talking Book Library was carved out in the year 1990. On integration of all the Units in 1967, the Government established National Centre for the Blind (NCB). This centre was further upgraded as National Institute for the Visually Handicapped in the year 1979. In October 1982 it was registered under the Societies Registration Act, 1860 and gained the status of an Autonomous Body.

== Regional service ==
The institute has its regional center in Chennai, Tamil Nadu (National Institute for the Empowerment of Persons with Visual Disabilities (Divyangjan), Regional Center) to provide rehabilitation services in the southern states of India. It renders vocational training at par with NIEPVD. It also provides rehabilitation services to the rural-based visually impaired persons through its Community Based Rehabilitation activities. The Regional Centre in Chennai was established in 1988 and two Regional Chapters at Kolkata (W.B.) and Secunderabad (Telangana, then: Andhra Pradesh) - in 1997. These Chapters provide peripheral services and are being served by a small component of Officers and Staff transferred from the Headquarters, whereas, Regional Centre at Chennai is a full-fledged Institute with staff strength of 30 headed by a Regional Director. The institute also coordinates and supervises Composite Regional Centre for Persons with Disabilities, Sundernagar (H.P.) established in the year 2001.
