= Article 15 of the Constitution of India =

Anti-discrimination article

Article 15 of the Constitution of India forbids discrimination on grounds only of religion, race, caste, sex, or place of birth or any of them. It applies Article 14's general principle of equality in specific situations by forbidding classifications made on protected grounds. While prohibiting discrimination based on prejudice, the Article is also the central issue in a large body of judicial decisions, public debate, and legislation revolving around affirmative action, reservations, and quotas. As of the 103rd Amendment of the Constitution of India, Article 15 has six clauses. Clause (1) prohibits discrimination against citizens on protected grounds. Clause (2) mandates that citizens may access various public or commercial spaces or utilities without discrimination on protected grounds. Clauses (3)-(6) allow the State to create 'special provisions' for women, children, socially and educationally backward classes, scheduled castes and scheduled tribes and economically weaker sections.

== Background ==
On 29 November 1948, the Constituent Assembly debated the first version of Article 15 as Article 9 of the revised Draft Constitution, 1948. Draft Article 9 read:

(1) The State shall not discriminate against any citizen on grounds only of religion, race, caste, sex or any of them. In particular, no citizen shall, on grounds only of religion, race, caste, sex or any of them, be subject to any disability, liability, restriction or condition with regard to

(a) Access to shops, public restaurants, hotels and places of public entertainment, or
(b) The use of wells, tanks, roads and places of public resort maintained wholly or partly out of the revenues of the State or dedicated to the use of the general public.

(2) Nothing in this article shall prevent the State from making any special provision for women and children.

Some members of the Assembly wanted additional protected grounds, including a prohibition on discrimination based on family and descent. Other members argued further that gardens, roads, and tramways should be included as places where denial of access is prohibited. However, B. R. Ambedkar, the chairman of the Drafting Committee, clarified that the general nature of the text was sufficient to cover a large variety of spaces not specifically included in the Article. Prof. K.T. Shah, a member of the Assembly, proposed that Clause 2 of the Draft Article be amended to provide for special provisions for 'Scheduled Castes or backward tribes for their advantage, safeguard, or betterment.' However, the proposal was rejected, with Ambedkar arguing that adopting the amendment would perpetuate the segregation of these groups. After debate and amendment, the original text remained largely intact and became Article 15 of the Constitution of India.

== Clauses 1-2: Prohibition of discrimination on protected grounds ==
The first two clauses of Article 15 prohibit discrimination 'on grounds only' of religion, race, caste, sex, place of birth or any of them. In interpreting the phrase 'on grounds only', the Supreme Court has held that the effect of the statute is relevant, not the motive. The phrase was initially interpreted as meaning that an act or law that was based on any ground in addition to the five protected grounds, it would not be prohibited. For example, in 1989, a Regulation that required air hostesses of the national carrier to retire earlier, or under certain conditions including pregnancy or marriage, was only partially struck down. The Supreme Court held that it was discrimination not just on the basis of sex, but other considerations such as working conditions and employment routes. This was criticised by academics and feminists for failing to take the social role of gender into account. However, in 2007, the Court recognised that discrimination on the basis of sex should include discrimination based on stereotypes associated with sex and struck down a law that prevented women from working in premises where liquor was served. Article 15 has since received broader interpretations, and been used to read down a law that criminalised consensual sexual intercourse between persons of the same sex as discriminatory, and provide protections on the grounds of sexual orientation and gender identity. The Court has also recognised that Article 15 should be interpreted through the lens of intersectionality, taking multiple and intersecting identities into account.

=== General prohibition against state discrimination ===
(1) The State shall not discriminate against any citizen on grounds only of religion, race, caste, sex, place of birth or any of them

Clause 1 of the Article prohibits the State from discriminating against citizens on five protected grounds.

Within three years of the adoption of the Constitution, the Supreme Court used Article 15 to invalidate a State law which provided for elections which had separate electorates for members of different religious communities. Similarly, courts have found discrimination on the basis of religion under Article 15 in the context of special provisions for Muslims, and reservation of a State legislature seat for one religious community.

The Supreme Court has held that the Article 15 prohibition on race discrimination should be read along with the International Convention on the Elimination of All Forms of Racial Discrimination. The provision was used to direct the Union to set up a committee to address racial discrimination against people from North-East India. Some courts have connected race to protections for Scheduled Tribes. Courts have on occasion struck down discriminatory legislation on the basis of race such as in the case of a law which required members of a particular community to report daily to the police. Courts have also struck down discriminatory legislation on the basis of caste, as in the case of a notification which exempted all Harijan and Muslim residents from a compulsory levy in a locality.

Similarly, the Article has been used to invalidate sex discrimination by legislation, such as prohibitions on proprietresses holding property or working in premises where liquor was served. The Supreme Court has interpreted 'sex' as including both 'sexual orientation' and 'gender identity' which has extended the protection of Article 15 to Gay, Lesbian, Bisexual and Transgender persons.

Like the other protected grounds, 'place of birth' has also been a source of some ambiguity. In 1955, the Supreme Court distinguished between 'place of birth' and 'residence', holding that discrimination on the basis of 'residence' was not prohibited outright by Article 15. In that ruling, the Court upheld a State Medical College's decision to require a capitation fee from students residing outside the region on the grounds that the decision discriminated on the basis of residence or domicile and not on 'place of birth'. The Court diluted that decision in Pradeep Jain v. Union of India, holding that residence requirements (while not prohibited outright by Article 15(1)) were inconsistent with the idea of national unity and integration, and limited residence-based reservations to not more than seventy percent of total seats at the MBBS level.

For much of its history, Article 15 did not prohibit indirect discrimination. For example, in 1951, the Madras High Court held that the Evacuation Property Ordinance, 1949 did not violate clause (1), though most individuals affected by the ordinance were Muslim, as the operation of the ordinance was not restricted to Muslims alone on the ground of religion. However, in 2021, the Supreme Court in Lt. Col. Nitisha v. Union of India invalidated a facially neutral criteria for the grant of Permanent Commissions to women on the grounds that it was indirectly discriminatory.

=== Horizontal prohibition of denial of access ===
(2) No citizen shall, on grounds only of religion, race, caste, sex, place of birth or any of them, be subject to any disability, liability, restriction or condition with regard to (a) access to shops, public restaurants, hotels and places of public entertainment; or (b) the use of wells, tanks, bathing ghats, roads and places of public resort maintained wholly or partly out of State funds or dedicated to the use of the general public

Unlike Clause 1 which is addressed to the State, Clause 2 creates a broader prohibition on disability, liability, restriction, or condition with regard to accessing various public spaces and commercial establishments. Sub-clause (a) uses the word 'shop' broadly, to mean premises where goods are sold in any capacity, and including everything from hairdressing saloons to educational institutions. Therefore, there cannot be shops, public restaurants, or spaces of public entertainment which are reserved on the basis of any of the protected grounds. Some scholarship argues that the definition of 'shop' in sub-clause (a) should extend to all private economic market transactions, including exclusionary covenants for the lease of property. Sub-clause (b) relates to the use of wells, bathing ghats, roads and places of public resort maintained wholly or partly out of State funds or dedicated to the use of the general public. Accordingly, private wells and tanks are not regulated by sub-clause (b), unless they are dedicated to the use of the general public.

== Clauses 3-6: Special provisions for disadvantaged groups ==
Article 15, in Clauses (3-6), allows for positive discrimination in favour of disadvantaged groups. These clauses exist to allow the Indian state's expansive programme of affirmative action.

=== Women and children ===
(3) Nothing in this article shall prevent the State from making any special provision for women and children

While Article 15 prohibits discrimination on the grounds of sex, special provisions for women and children are permissible. State institutions created exclusively for women, or special places reserved for women in public transport or places of entertainment do not violate Article 15. However, a 'special provision' does not mean that less favourable treatment may be given to women on a gender-based criterion.

=== Socially and educationally backward classes ===
(4) Nothing in this article or in clause (2) of Article 29 shall prevent the State from making any special provision for the advancement of any socially and educationally backward classes of citizens or for the Scheduled Castes and the Scheduled Tribes

==== Reservations in educational institutions ====
(5) Nothing in this article or in sub-clause (g) of clause (1) of Article 19 shall prevent the State from making any special provision, by law, for the advancement of any socially and educationally backward classes of citizens or for the Scheduled Castes or the Scheduled Tribes insofar as such special provisions relate to their admission to educational institutions including private education institutions, whether aided or unaided by the State, other than the minority educational institutions referred to in clause (1) of Article 30.

=== Economically weaker sections ===
(6) Nothing in this article or sub-clause (g) of clause (1) of article 19 or clause (2) of article 29 shall prevent the State from making,— (a) any special provision for the advancement of any economically weaker sections of citizens other than the classes mentioned in clauses (4) and (5); and (b) any special provision for the advancement of any economically weaker sections of citizens other than the classes mentioned in clauses (4) and (5) in so far as such special provisions relate to their admission to educational institutions including private educational institutions, whether aided or unaided by the State, other than the minority educational institutions referred to in clause (1) of article 30, which in the case of reservation would be in addition to the existing reservations and subject to a maximum of ten percent of the total seats in each category.
Explanation.—For the purposes of this article and article 16, "economically weaker sections" shall be such as may be notified by the State from time to time on the basis of family income and other indicators of economic disadvantage.

Clause (6) was inserted by the 103rd Constitutional Amendment in 2019. The provision allows for the State to provide for affirmative action including reservations for economically weaker sections (EWS). Various States have introduced schemes to implement reservations for EWS on the basis of Clause (6). In 2021, the Union government issued a notification to introduce EWS reservation in the medical postgraduate entrance exam. This decision was challenged at the Supreme Court.

==== Challenge to constitutionality and Supreme Court decision ====
Various parties challenged the 103rd Amendment at the Supreme Court. They argued that it violates the basic structure of the Indian Constitution, which in their view does not allow reservations on purely economic criteria. On 7 November 2022, a five-judge bench of the Supreme Court of India held, in Janhit Abhiyan v Union of India, that the 103rd Amendment did not violate the basic structure. Justices Maheshwari, Trivedi, and Pardiwala wrote separate judgments for the majority. Justice Bhat wrote a dissenting opinion on behalf of himself and Chief Justice U.U Lalit, that has been praised in progressive quarters.
