= National Commission for Scheduled Castes =

Indian constitutional body

Commission overview
- Formed: 19 February 2004; 22 years ago
- Preceding Commission: National Commission for Scheduled Castes and Scheduled Tribes 1978
- Jurisdiction: Ministry of Social Justice and Empowerment, Government of India
- Headquarters: New Delhi
- Minister responsible: Ministry of Social Justice and Empowerment
- Commission executives: Kishor Makwana, Chairman; Love Kush Kumar, Member; Vaddepalli Ramchander, Member
- Website: ncsc.nic.in

The National Commission for Scheduled Castes (NCSC) is a constitutional body under the Ministry of Social Justice and Empowerment, Government of India, established in 2004. It is responsible for the protection, welfare, development, and advancement of Scheduled Castes in India. Article 338 of the Indian constitution deals with National Commission for Scheduled Castes. Article 338 A deals with National Commission for Scheduled Tribes.

== History ==
=== Commission for Scheduled Castes and Scheduled Tribes ===
The first Commission for Scheduled Castes and Scheduled Tribes was set up in August 1978 with Bhola Paswan Shastri as chairman and other four members. In addition to the chairman, members of the commission include a vice chairman and four other members. It was set up as a national level advisory body to advise the government on broad policy issues and levels of development of Scheduled Castes and Scheduled Tribes. The president of India appoints the chairman of commission. The fifth schedule of Indian constitution deals with the administration and control of Scheduled Castes and Scheduled Tribes. Service condition and tenure is determined by president of India. Article 341 deals with notification of Scheduled Castes and Article 342 deals with notification of Scheduled Tribes.

The first Commission was constituted in 1992 with S. H. Ramdhan as chairman.

The second Commission was constituted in October 1995 with H. Hanumanthappa as chairman.

The third Commission was constituted in December 1998 with Dileep Singh Bhuria as the chairman.

The fourth Commission was constituted in March 2002 with Dr. Bizay Sonkar Shastri as the chairperson.

Consequent upon the Constitution (Eighty-Ninth Amendment) Act, 2003 the erstwhile National Commission for Scheduled Castes and Scheduled Tribes has been replaced by:

- National Commission for Scheduled Castes and
- National Commission for Scheduled Tribes.

=== National Commission for Scheduled Castes ===
The first National Commission for Scheduled Castes was constituted in 2004 with Suraj Bhan as the chairman. The second was constituted in May 2007 (chairperson: Buta Singh); the third from October 2010 (P. L. Punia); and the fourth from 2013, also with Punia as chairperson. The fifth National Commission for Scheduled Castes began work in 2017 under chairmanship of Ram Shankar Katheria. L Murugan was made vice chairman with K.Ramulu, Dr Yogendra Paswan and Dr. Swaraj Vidwan as members. The President has appointed Shri Vijaya Sampla as the chairman of the sixth National Commission for Scheduled Castes. Shri Arun Halder is the vice-chairman. Shri Subhash Ramnath Pardhi and Smt. Anju Bala are the other members of the sixth NCSC.

== Functions ==
The following are the functions of the commission:

- To investigate and monitor all matters relating to the safeguards provided for the Scheduled Castes under this Constitution or under any other law for the time being in force or under any order of the Government and to evaluate the working of such safeguards
- To inquire into specific complaints with respect to the deprivation of rights and safeguards of the Scheduled Castes
- To participate and advise on the planning process of socio-economic development of the Scheduled Castes and to evaluate the progress of their development under the Union and any State
- To present to the President, annually and at such other times as the Commission may deem fit, reports upon the working of those safeguards
- To make in such reports recommendations as to the measures that should be taken by the Union or any State for the effective implementation of those safeguards and other measures for the protection, welfare and socio-economic development of the Scheduled Castes
- To discharge such other functions in relation to the protection, welfare and development and advancement of the Scheduled Castes as the President may, subject to the provisions of any law made by Parliament, by rule specify

== List of Chairman ==
#	Portrait	Name	State	Tenure			Commission	Vice-chairman
1		Suraj Bhan	Haryana	24 February 2004	6 August 2006	2 years, 163 days	1st	Fakir Vaghela
2		Buta Singh	Punjab	25 May 2007	24 May 2010	2 years, 364 days	2nd	N. M. Kamble
3		P. L. Punia	Haryana	15 October 2010	14 October 2013	2 years, 364 days	3rd	Raj Kumar Verka
3		P. L. Punia	Haryana	22 October 2013	21 October 2016	2 years, 365 days	4th	Raj Kumar Verka
4		Ram Shankar Katheria	Uttar Pradesh	31 May 2017	30 May 2020	2 years, 365 days	5th	L. Murugan
5		Vijay Sampla	Punjab	18 February 2021	18 July 2023	348 days	6th	Arun Halder
6		Kishor Makwana	Gujarat	2 years, 194 days	Incumbent		7th	

== See also ==
- National Commission for Backward Classes
- National Commission for Scheduled Tribes
- National Human Rights Commission of India
