= Deendayal Upadhyaya Institute for the Physically Handicapped =

Pandit Deendayal Upadhyaya National Institute for Persons with Physical Disabilities (Divyangjan) (P.D.U.N.I.P.P.D.) is an autonomous organisation under the administrative and financial control of Ministry of Social Justice and Empowerment, government of India. Dr Jitendra Sharma is the current Director.

It is a premier institute for healthcare

== History ==
It was started by the late Shri Nirankar Swaroop as a non-governmental organisation in the late 1950s to cater comprehensive rehabilitation services to children and persons with disabilities. It started pioneering work of manpower development in the fields of physical and occupational therapy in the northern part of country.

This institute came into being when the erstwhile Jawahar Lal Nehru Institute of Physical Medicine and Rehabilitation and other allied institution run by the council for the aid of persons with physical disabilities were taken over by the government of India on 22 May 1975 and converted into an autonomous body in 1976. The erstwhile voluntary organisation was taken over by Ministry of Social Welfare in 1975 and converted into a registered society in 1976.

== Aims and objectives ==
Human resource development in the fields of:

- Physiotherapy or Physical Therapy
- Occupational Therapy
- Prosthetics and orthotics

Rehabilitation by the way of Outpatient Services in the fields of Orthopedics, Physiotherapy, Occupational Therapy, Prosthetics and Orthotics, Speech Therapy and other rehabilitation services as the society may deem fit to orthopaedically disabled persons with associated intellectual disability.

Research and development:

- To undertake, initiate, sponsor or stimulate research aimed at developing more effective techniques for the education and rehabilitation of the disabled persons.
- To co-operate with national, regional or local agencies in research or such other activities as may be designed to promote the development of services for the disabled persons.

== Services ==
The institute aims to serve the physically disabled of all age groups. In this pursuit of alleviating the suffering of disabled people, the institute runs the following programme:

- Bachelor of Physical Therapy, Bachelor of Occupational Therapy and Bachelor of Prosthetics & Orthotics, 4-½ years duration course and Masters in Prosthetics & Orthotics, 2 years course in affiliation with University of Delhi.
- Outpatient clinical services in Physical Therapy, Occupational Therapy and Speech Therapy.
- Workshop for the fabrication of Orthotic and Prosthetic appliances including calipers, splints, artificial limbs, surgical boots and customized wooden furniture for the persons with locomotor impairments.
- Out-reach camps for the economically weaker disabled persons, living in far-flung and remote areas, with the help of district administration and locally active non-governmental organizations.
- Extend institutional comprehensive rehabilitation services to persons with disabilities by establishing and operationalizing of Southern Regional Rehabilitation Centre (SRC), secunderabad (AP), District Disability Rehabilitation Centres (DDRCs) and facilitating the establishment of Regional Spinal Injury Centre.
- Integrated School for orthopaedically disabled children up to Vth standard approved by the Municipal Corporation of Delhi.
- Social, psychological and vocational counseling services for people with disabilities.
- Printing press to cater to the printing needs of the Institute and Ministry for dissemination of information and generation of awareness.
