= National Institute for the Empowerment of Persons with Intellectual Disabilities =

Indian organization

National Institute for the Empowerment of Persons with Intellectual Disabilities (NIEPID) is an autonomous organization functioning under the aegis of Indian Ministry of Social Justice and Empowerment with the primary objective of empowering people with intellectual disabilities. NIEPID was formerly known as National Institute for the Mentally Handicapped (NIMH). NIEPID has three regional centers located at Noida/ New Delhi, Kolkata, & Mumbai. Maj (Dr) B. V. Ram Kumar is the current Director.

== History ==
Based in Secunderabad in Hyderabad, the organization was registered in 1984 and began offering its services since 1985. In 2009, the organization celebrated its 25 years of inception.

== Activities ==
The organization aims to work in the direction of human resources development, perform research and development, development of models of care and rehabilitation, prepare documentation and dissemination, offer consultancy services to voluntary organizations, conduct community-based rehabilitation and organize extension and outreach programs. The organization is ISO 9001:2000 certified.

The organization conducts various activities in order to achieve its objectives. In 2004, the organization collaborated with United States–based National Institute on Disability and Rehabilitation Research for a workshop on autism. During the same time of year, the organization began offering a master's degree program in disability rehabilitation—said to be one of its kind. The organization has also carried out initiatives against discrimination of people with disabilities. The institute has trained 35,000 parents since its inception by organising group parent training programs based on child characteristics and parent demographic features. In 2011, Lady Gaga visited the organization and discussed ideas to support disabled children.
