= National Institute for Empowerment of Persons with Multiple Disabilities =

Indian government agency

National Institute for Empowerment of Persons with Multiple Disabilities (NIEPMD) is an Indian government agency providing services to persons with multiple disabilities. It was established by Government of India under the aegis of the Department of Disability Affairs within the Ministry of Social Justice and Empowerment at Chennai. It runs HRD programs to train rehabilitation professionals. The institute provides services such as physiotherapy, speech therapy, occupational therapy, psychological intervention, vocational training, and special education. The institute is the first of its kind in Asia dedicated exclusively to persons with multiple disabilities.
