= Rajiv Goswami =

Indian activist (1971–2004)

- Born: 12 June 1971
- Died: 24 February 2004 (aged 32)
- Occupation: Student leader

Rajiv Goswami (12 June 1971 – 24 February 2004) was an Indian activist and a former commerce student at the Deshbandhu College, Delhi University who came into prominence when he attempted self-immolation on 19 September 1990 to protest against Prime Minister V. P. Singh's implementation of the Mandal Commission recommendations for job reservations for backward castes in India. Goswami spearheaded a formidable movement against the Mandal Commission and his act of self-immolation led to larger protests and a series of self-immolations by college students throughout India. During Mandal commission agitation, the AIIMS intersection in Delhi was temporarily renamed by students to Rajiv Chowk in a celebration of his act.

Subsequently, he was elected to the position of the Delhi University Students Union president. He later gave up active politics due to health problems and started his own business. In the following years he was frequently in and out of hospitals because of severe health complications resulting from his self-immolation bid.

== Personal life ==
Rajiv Goswami was the only son of Madan Lal, a clerk in the Indian Postal Department, and belonged to a middle-class Punjabi Brahmin family with six sisters.

He was a resident of Gomti Apartments at Kalkaji in New Delhi. While at Deshbandhu College, a constituent institution of the University of Delhi, Goswami engaged in student politics as a member of the Delhi University Students' Union (DUSU) central panel.

He died on 24 February 2004 at the age of 32 in Holy Family Hospital Okhla, New Delhi. His mother, Nandrani Goswami, was one of the speakers at anti reservation protests in 2006.

== See also ==
- Mandal Commission protests of 1990
