= National Commission for Scheduled Tribes =

Indian constitutional body

Commission overview
- Formed: 19 February 2004; 22 years ago
- Preceding Commission: National Commission for Scheduled Castes and Scheduled Tribes 1978
- Jurisdiction: Government of India
- Headquarters: Delhi
- Minister responsible: Ministry of Tribal Affairs
- Commission executives: Antar Singh Arya, Chairman; Dr. Asha Lakra, Member; Shri Jatothu Hussain, Member; Nirupam Chakma, Member
- Website: https://ncst.nic.in (https://ncst.gov.in)

National Commission for Scheduled Tribes (NCST) is an Indian constitutional body that was established through Constitution (89th Amendment) Act, 2003.

== History ==
On the 89th Amendment of the Constitution coming into force on 19 February 2004, the National Commission for scheduled Tribes has been set up under Article 338A on bifurcation of erstwhile National Commission for Scheduled Castes and Scheduled Tribes to oversee the implementation of various safeguards provided to Scheduled Tribes under the Constitution.

With this amendment, the erstwhile National Commission for Scheduled Castes and Scheduled Tribes was replaced by two separate Commissions namely- (i) The National Commission for Scheduled Castes (NCSC), and (ii) The National Commission for Scheduled Tribes (NCST).

The First commission was constituted in 2004 with Kunwar Singh as the chairperson.

The present chairman of NCST is Antar Singh Arya.

== Composition ==
The Commission comprises a Chairperson, a Vice-Chairperson and three full-time Members (including one female Member). The term of all the Members of the Commission is three years from the date of assumption of charge.

== Functions ==
The following are the functions of the commission:

- To investigate and monitor all matters relating to the safeguards provided for the Scheduled Tribes under the Constitution or under any other law for the time being in force or under any order of the Government and to evaluate the working of such safeguards;
- To inquire into specific complaints with respect to the deprivation of rights and safeguards of the Scheduled Tribes;
- To participate and advise in the planning process of socio-economic development of the Scheduled Tribes and to evaluate the progress of their development under the Union and any State;
- To present to the President, annually and at such other times as the Commission may deem fit, reports upon the working of those safeguards;
- To make in such reports, recommendations as to the measures that should be taken by the Union or any State for effective implementation of those safeguards and other measures for the protection, welfare and socio-economic development of the Scheduled Tribes, and
- To discharge such other functions in relation to the protection, welfare and development and advancement of the Scheduled Tribes as the President may, subject to the provisions of any law made by Parliament, by rule specify.
- The Commission would also discharge the following other functions in relation to the protection, welfare and development & advancement of the Scheduled Tribes, namely:-
  - Measures that need to be taken over conferring ownership rights in respect of minor forest produce to the Scheduled Tribes living in forest areas.
  - Measures to be taken to safeguard rights to the Tribal Communities over mineral resources, water resources etc. as per law.
  - Measures to be taken for the development of tribals and to work for move viable livelihood strategies.
  - Measures to be taken to improve the efficacy of relief and rehabilitation measures for tribal groups displaced by development projects.
  - Measures to be taken to prevent alienation of tribal people from land and to effectively rehabilitate such people in whose case alienation has already taken place.
  - Measures to be taken to elicit maximum cooperation and involvement of Tribal Communities for protecting forests and undertaking social afforestation.
  - Measures to be taken to ensure full implementation of the Provisions of Panchayats (Extension to Scheduled Areas) Act, 1996.
  - Measures to be taken to reduce and ultimately eliminate the practice of shifting cultivation by Tribals that lead to their continuous disempowerment and degradation of land and the environment.

== List of Chairpersons ==
No.	Name	Portrait	Term of office		Commission
1	Kunwar Singh Tekam		2004	2007	1st
2	Urmila Singh		2007	2010	2nd
3	Rameshwar Oraon		2010	2013	3rd
4	Rameshwar Oraon		2013	2017	4th
5	Nand Kumar Sai		2017	2020	5th
6	Harsh Chouhan		2021	2023	6th
7	Antar Singh Arya		2024		7th

== See also ==
- National Commission for Backward Classes
- National Commission for Scheduled Castes
