= National Commission for Backward Classes =

Specialized body of Government of India

- NCBC राष्ट्रीय पिछड़ा वर्ग आयोग

Commission overview
- Formed: 14 August 1993; 33 years ago Constitutional status granted on 11 August 2018; 8 years ago
- Jurisdiction: Government of India
- Headquarters: New Delhi
- Minister responsible: Virendra Kumar Khatik, Minister of Social Justice and Empowerment
- Commission executive: Sadhvi Niranjan Jyoti, Chairman; Vice Chairman
- Website: www.ncbc.nic.in

The National Commission for Backward Classes (NCBC) is a constitutional body under the Ministry of Social Justice and Empowerment, Government of India. It was originally a statutory body established in 1993 through the National Commission for Backward Classes Act of 1993. In 2018, through the 102nd constitutional amendment, it was granted constitutional status under Article 338B of the Constitution of India.

The main work of the commission is to participate in and advise actively on the socio-economic development of the socially backward classes (OBCs) along with evaluating the progress of their development.

== History ==
=== Statutory backing ===
The commission was the outcome of Indra Sawhney & Others v. Union of India, a public interest litigation before the Supreme Court of India. In its Judgement dated 16.11.1992 in Writ Petition (Civil) No. 930 of 1990 – Indra Sawhney & Ors. Vs. Union of India and Ors., reported in (1992) Supp. 3 SCC 217 the Supreme Court directed the Government of India, State Governments and Union Territory Administrations to constitute a permanent body in the nature of a Commission or Tribunal for entertaining, examining and recommending upon requests for inclusion and complaints of over-inclusion and under-inclusion in the list of OBCs. The Supreme Court held that the Constitution recognised only social and educational – and not economic – backwardness.

The number of backward castes in Central list of OBCs has now increased to 5,013+ (without the figures for most of the Union Territories) in 2006 as per National Commission for Backward Classes. In October 2015, National Commission for Backward Classes proposed that a person belonging to OBC with an annual family income of up to ₹15 lakhs should be considered as minimum ceiling for OBC. NCBC also recommended sub-division of OBCs into 'backward', 'more backward' and 'extremely backward' blocs and divide 27% quota amongst them in proportion to their population, to ensure that stronger OBCs don't corner the quota benefits.

=== Constitutionality ===
According to article 340 of the Indian Constitution, President shall establish a commission to examine the condition of social and backward class.

== Composition ==
According to Article 338B :-

- (2) Subject to the provisions of any law made in this behalf by Parliament, the Commission shall consist of a Chairperson, Vice-Chairperson and three other Members and the conditions of service and tenure of office of the Chairperson, Vice-Chairperson and other Members so appointed shall be such as the President may by rule determine.
- (3) The Chairperson, Vice-Chairperson and other Members of the Commission shall be appointed by the President by warrant under his hand and seal.
- (4) The Commission shall have the power to regulate its own procedure.

=== Current members ===
The commission currently consists of following members

Position	Member
Chairperson	Sadhvi Niranjan Jyoti
Vice Chairman	N.A
Member	Mr. Bhuvan Bhusahan Kamal
Member	Mr. Kaushlendra Singh Patel
Member	Mr. Thalloju Achary
Legal Advisor	Mr. Ramesh Babu Vishwanathula
Law Consultant	Mr. Vishvendra Singh

== List of Chairman ==
#	Name	Portrait	State	Tenure		
1.	Hansraj Gangaram Ahir		Maharashtra	2 December 2022	18 March 2026	3 years, 106 days
2.	Sadhvi Niranjan Jyoti		Uttar Pradesh	18 March 2026	Incumbent	191 days

== Functions and power ==
The commission considers inclusions in and exclusions from the lists of communities notified as backward for the purpose of job reservations and tenders the needful advice to the Central Government as per Section 9(1) of the NCBC Act, 1993. Similarly, the states have also constituted commissions for BC's. As of 24 July 2014 over two thousand groups have been listed as OBCs. The National Commission for Backward Classes, National Commission for Scheduled Castes as well as National Commission for Scheduled Tribes have the same powers as a Civil Court. Initially National Commission for Backward Classes was not empowered to look into the grievances of persons of Other Backward Classes (under Article 338(5) read with Article 338(10) of the Constitution, National Commission for Scheduled Castes was the competent authority to look into all the grievances, rights and safeguards relating to Backward Classes). But consequent to the 102nd Constitutional Amendment Act and the insertion of Article 338B, these powers are now vested in NCBC.

According to Article 338B(5) It shall be the duty of the Commission—

1. to investigate and monitor all matters relating to the safeguards provided for the socially and educationally backward classes under this Constitution or under any other law for the time being in force or under any order of the Government and to evaluate the working of such safeguards;
2. to inquire into specific complaints with respect to the deprivation of rights and safeguards of the socially and educationally backward classes;
3. to participate and advise on the socio-economic development of the socially and educationally backward classes and to evaluate the progress of their development under the Union and any State;
4. to present to the President, annually and at such other times as the Commission may deem fit, reports upon the working of those safeguards;
5. to make in such reports the recommendations as to the measures that should be taken by the Union or any State for the effective implementation of those safeguards and other measures for the protection, welfare and socio-economic development of the socially and educationally backward classes; and
6. to discharge such other functions in relation to the protection, welfare and development and advancement of the socially and educationally backward classes as the President may, subject to the provisions of any law made by Parliament, by rule specify.

== See also ==
OBCs

- Creamy layer
- Mandal Commission
- Other Backward Classes

Ministry

- Ministry of Social Justice and Empowerment
- National Commission for Scheduled Castes
- National Commission for Scheduled Tribes

Others

- Reservation in India
- Caste system in India
- Socio Economic and Caste Census 2011
- Scheduled Castes and Scheduled Tribes
