= National Scheduled Castes Finance and Development Corporation =

National Scheduled Castes Finance and Development Corporation (NSFDC) was set up in 1989 as a non profit company under Ministry of Social Justice and Empowerment, Government of India for financing, facilitating and mobilizing funds for the economic empowerment of persons belonging to the Scheduled Castes families living below double the Poverty Line.
