= Mandal Commission =

Indian commission to identify socially and educationally backward ethnic groups

The Mandal Commission or the Socially and Educationally Backward Classes Commission (SEBC), was established in India in 1979 by the Janata Party government under Prime Minister Morarji Desai with a mandate to "identify the socially or educationally backward classes" of India. It was headed by B. P. Mandal, an Indian member of parliament, to consider the question of reservations for people to address caste discrimination, and to use eleven social, economic, and educational indicators to determine backwardness. In 1980, based on its rationale that OBCs ("Other Backward Class") identified on the basis of caste, social, economic indicators made up 52% of India's population, the commission's report recommended that members of Other Backward Classes (OBC) be granted reservations to 27% of jobs under the central government and public sector undertakings and seats in the higher education institutions, thus making the total number of reservations for SC, ST and OBC to 49.5%.

Though the report had been completed in 1980, the V. P. Singh government declared its intent to implement the report in August 1990, leading to widespread student protests. As per the Constitution of India, Article 15 (4) states, " Nothing in this Article or in clause (2) of Article 29 shall prevent the State from making any provision for the advancement of any socially or educationally backward classes of citizens or for Scheduled Castes and Scheduled tribes". The Mandal Commission had therefore created a report using the data of the 1931 census, the last caste-aware census, extrapolated with some sample studies.

V. P. Singh was accused of using the Mandal Report despite it having previously been ignored by the Congress government. With almost 75% of the Indian population to receive preferential treatment in government employment, up from 25%, caused social unrest. Earlier 25% population of India which is Scheduled Castes and Scheduled Tribes, was covered and now, more than 25% of Other Backward Class came under reservation. The decision of V.P Singh government led to Mandal Commission protests of 1990. The upper caste youth went for massive protest in large numbers in the nation's campuses, resulting in self immolations by a student.

Indra Sawhney challenged the Mandal Commission and government decision to implement it in the Supreme Court in front of a nine Judge bench. The case was known as Indra Sawhney and Others v. Union of India. After hearing both sides the bench upheld the decision of government of reserving 27% of jobs under the central government and public sector undertakings with a provision that there will be ceiling of 50 per cent quotas and emphasized the concept of "social backwardness", and prescribed 11 indicators to ascertain backwardness. Also, the bench held that creamy layer of income will be applicable for the Other Backward Classes quota. Presently the creamy layer limit is Family income of ₹8 lakhs per year. It was implemented in 1992.

The second recommendation of Mandal Commission to implement discriminatory OBC reservations in higher educational institutions was implemented in 2006. The Union Minister of Human Resource Development at that time, Arjun Singh promised to reserve 27% seats for Other Backward Class in All India Institutes of Medical Sciences (AIIMS), Indian Institutes of Technology (IITs), National Institutes of Technology (NITs), Indian Institutes of Management (IIMs), Indian Institute of Science (IISc) and other central institutions of higher education. The Ninety-third Amendment of the Constitution of India that was introduced by the First Manmohan Singh ministry, granted a 27% reservation for Other Backward Classes in all Central Government institutions.

This decision of government led to 2006 Indian anti-reservation protests. The protests ended when on 10 April 2008, in the Ashoka Kumar Thakur v. Union of India case, the Supreme Court upheld the Ninety-third Constitutional Amendment and Central Educational Institutions(CEIs) (Reservation in Admission) Act, 2006, for the provision of 27% quota for candidates belonging to the Other Backward Classes in IITs, NITs, IIMs, AIIMS, IISc and other premier educational institutions.

== Historical background of India ==
The primary objective that the Mandal Commission had in India was to Identify the conditions regarding social and educational backward classes to consider the question of reservations of seats and quotas.

Leading to the formation of the Mandal Commission, Indian society was based largely on the principles of Jaati and Varna, and to that extent a partially closed system. As the result of colonialism, the artisan and similar classes had been impoverished. This created a social stratification that played a dominant role within Indian society, laying the context for the Mandal Commission to be formed. Therefore, during the late 1900s India witnessed caste and class to stand for different patterns of distribution of properties/occupations for individuals. This directly affected Scheduled Castes and Scheduled Tribes that were known collectively as Other Backward Classes (OBC), which were the focal groups that experienced the severities of colonial exploitation and the resultant caste/class stratification within the social organization found within traditional India.

The extent of how embedded the caste system is in India, coupled with the colonial impoverishment that many groups such as Scheduled Castes and Scheduled Tribes experience, paved the path towards the Indian state to recognize/attempt to redress caste discrimination. Other Backward Class have historically been excluded from opportunities and duties that lead to socioeconomic advancement in Indian society. The artisans, peasants, farmers, and owners of cottage industries bore the direct brunt of exploitation under the British Raj. Many self sufficient cottage industries were destroyed to serve colonial needs. The rise of Industrialisation and Globalization changed the economic structures in rural India and was another factor leading to the impoverishment of the artisan classes. Combined with social mobility - social is hereditary, and marrying outside one's group is rare.

However, two different types of change that were prevalent during the lead up to the Mandal Commission was: Change in the relative positions of the groups in the caste hierarchy and the Change in how the tendency of how hereditary groups were ranked. Respectively, the first did not impair the caste system as a form of "social stratification" and the second type of change lead to the caste system to transform entirely. Educational background in relation to occupation between two generations were found to be directly correlated. Thus, educational facilities played a critical role among Other Backward Class, and the opportunities for those who received poor/well education contributed to the overall social stratification of India. Additionally, the overlap between caste and economics became more apparent.

== Setting up the Mandal Commission ==
Appointment of a commission to investigate the conditions of backward classes in India every 10 years, for the purpose of Articles 15 (Prohibition of Discrimination on grounds of religion, race, caste, sex or place of birth). The First Backward Classes Commission had a broad-based membership, the Second Commission seemed to be shaped on partisan lines, composed of members only from the backward castes. Of its five members, four were from the OBCs; the remaining one, L.R. Naik, was from the Dalit community, and the only member from the scheduled castes in the commission. It is popularly known as the Mandal Commission for its chairman being B. P. Mandal

== Reservation policy ==
The Mandal Commission adopted various methods and techniques to collect the necessary data and evidence. In order to identify who qualified as an "other backward class," the commission adopted eleven criteria which could be grouped under three major headings: social, educational and economic. 11 criteria were developed to identify OBCs.

=== Social ===
1. Castes/classes considered as socially backward by others,
2. Castes/classes which mainly depend on manual labour for their livelihood,
3. Castes/classes where at least 25 per cent females and 10 per cent males above the state average get married at an age below the 17 years in rural areas and at least 10 per cent females and 5 per cent males do so in urban areas.
4. Castes/classes where participation of females in work is at least 25 per cent above the state average.

=== Educational ===
1. Castes/classes where the number of children in the age group of 5–15 years who never attended school is at least 25 per cent above the state average.
2. Castes/classes where the rate of student drop-out in the age group of 5–15 years is at least 25 per cent above the state average,
3. Castes/classes amongst whom the proportion of matriculates is at least 25 per cent below the state average,

=== Economic ===
1. Castes/classes where the average value of family assets is at least 25 per cent below the state average,
2. Castes/classes where the number of families living in kuccha houses is at least 25 per cent above the state average,
3. Castes/classes where the source of drinking water is beyond half a kilometre for more than 50 per cent of the households,
4. Castes/classes where the number of households having taken consumption loans is at least 25 per cent above the state average.

=== Weighting indicators ===
As the above deginal's family says that three groups are not of equal importance for the purpose, separate weightage was given to indicators in each group. All the Social indicators were given a weightage of 3 points each, educational indicators were given a weightage of 2 points each and economic indicators were given a weightage of 1 point each. Economic, in addition to social and educational Indicators, were considered important as they directly flowed from social and educational backwardness. This also helped to highlight the fact that socially and educationally backward classes are economically backward also.

Thus, the Mandal Commission judged classes on a scale from 0 to 22. These 11 indicators were applied to all the castes covered by the survey for a particular state. As a result of this application, all castes which had a score of 50% (i.e. 11 points) were listed as socially and educationally backward and the rest were treated as 'advanced'.

== Observations and findings ==
The commission estimated that 52% of the total population of India (excluding SCs and STs), belonging to 3,743 different castes and communities, were ‘backward’. Figures of caste-wise population are not available beyond. So the commission used 1931 census data to calculate the number of OBCs. The population of Hindu OBCs was derived by subtracting from the total population of Hindus, the population of SC and ST and that of forward Hindu castes and communities, and it worked out to be 52 per cent. Assuming that roughly the proportion of OBCs amongst non-Hindus was of the same order as amongst the Hindus, the population of non-Hindu OBCs was considered as 52 per cent.

Number of communities identified as OBC by the commission
State/UT	No. of Other Backward Class	No. of Depressed Backward Class
Andhra Pradesh	292	155
Assam	135	96
Bihar	168	97
Gujarat	105	61
Haryana	76	40
Himachal Pradesh	57	35
Jammu and Kashmir	63	40
Karnataka	333	204
Kerala	208	128
Madhya Pradesh	279	160
Maharashtra	272	164
Manipur	49	35
Meghalaya	37	13
Nagaland	0	0
Odisha	224	181
Punjab	83	34
Rajasthan	140	85
Sikkim	10	10
Tamil Nadu	288	171 (Note: the 171 figures for Depressed Backward Classes includes both Tamilnadu and Pondicherry)
Tripura	136	76
Uttar Pradesh	116	67
West Bengal	177	113
Andaman and Nicobar Islands	17	8
Arunachal Pradesh	10	6
Chandigarh	93	54
Dadra and Nagar Haveli	10	12
Delhi	82	40
Goa, Daman And Diu	18	18
Lakshadweep	0	0
Mizoram	5	5
Pondicherry	260	–
Aggregate Total	3,743	1,937
Pct. of India's population	52%	20.56%

The commission made various observation, including;

- Assuming that a child from an advanced class family and that of a backward class family had the same intelligence at the time of their birth, then owing to vast differences in social, cultural and environmental factors, the former will beat the latter by lengths in any competitive field. Even if an advanced class child's intelligence quotient was much lower compared to the child of backward class, chances are that the former will still beat the latter in any competition where selection is made on the basis of 'merit'.
- In fact, what we call 'merit' in an elitist society is an amalgam of native endowments and environmental privileges. A child from an advanced class family and that of a backward class family are not 'equals' in any fair sense of the term and it will be unfair to judge them by the same yard-stick. The conscience of a civilised society and the dictates of social justice demand that 'merit' and 'equality' are not turned into a fetish and the element of privilege is duly recognised and discounted for when 'unequal' are made to run the same race.
- To place the amalgams of open caste conflicts in proper historical context, the study done by Tata institute of Social Sciences Mumbai observes. "The British rulers produced many structural disturbances in the Hindu caste structure, and these were contradictory in nature and impact .... Thus, the various impacts of the British rule on the Hindu caste system, viz., near monopolisation of jobs, education and professions by the literati castes, the Western concepts of equality and justice undermining the Hindu hierarchical dispensation, the phenomenon of Sanskritisation,∅ Gentile Reform movement from above and militant reform movements from below, emergence of the caste associations with a new role set the stage for the caste conflicts in modern India. Two more ingredients which were very weak in the British period, viz., politicisation of the masses and universal adult franchise, became powerful moving forces after the Independence.

The introduction to the Recommendations section in the report presents the following argument:

As the commission had concluded that 52 per cent of the country's population consisted of OBCs, it initially argued that the percentage of reservations in public services for backward classes should also match that figure. However, as this would have gone against the earlier judgement of the Supreme Court of India which had laid down that reservation of posts must be below 50 per cent, the proposed reservation for OBCs had to be fixed at a figure, which when added to 22.5 per cent for SCs and STs, remains below the cap of 50 per cent. In view of this legal constraint the commission was obliged to recommend a reservation of 27 per cent only for backward castes. The overlap between caste and economic backwardness became even more tenuous as a result being that it extended to include the OBC.

== Implementation ==
Prior to the establishment of the Mandal Commission in India, the state of India faced caste discrimination in terms of social, economic, and political context. Living standards, scheduled castes, scheduled tribes, and OBC households were viewed to be significantly lower than in the mainstream population, comprising Hindu forward castes and other religious groups. In December 1980, the Mandal Commission submitted its Report which described the criteria it used to indicate backwardness, and stated its recommendations in light of its observations and findings. By then, the Janata government had fallen. The following Congress governments under Indira Gandhi and Rajiv Gandhi were not willing to act on the Report due to its politically contentious nature. After being neglected for 10 years, the Report was accepted by the National Front government led by V. P. Singh. On 7 August 1990, the National Front government declared that it would provide 27 per cent reservations to "socially and educationally backward classes" for jobs in central services and public undertaking. Having released the Government Order on 13 August, V. P. Singh announced its legal implementation in his Independence Day speech two days later.

That same year in September, a case was brought before the Supreme Court of India which challenged the constitutional validity of the Government Order for the implementation of the Mandal Report recommendations. Indra Sawhney, the petitioner in this case, made three principal arguments against the Order:

- The extension of reservation violated the Constitutional guarantee of equality of opportunity.
- Caste was not a reliable indicator of backwardness.
- The efficiency of public institutions was at risk.

The five-judge Bench of the Supreme Court issued a stay on the operation of the Government Order of 13 August until the final disposal of the case. On 16 November 1992, the Supreme Court, in its verdict, upheld the government order, being of the opinion that caste was an acceptable indicator of backwardness. Thus, the recommendation of reservations for OBCs in central government services was finally implemented in 1992.

== Protest ==
A decade after the commission gave its report, V. P. Singh, the Prime Minister at the time, tried to implement its recommendations in 1989. The criticism was sharp and colleges across the country held massive protests against it. These protests were known as Mandal Commission protests of 1990. On 19 September 1990, Rajiv Goswami, a student of Deshbandhu College, Delhi, attempted self-immolation in protest of the government's actions. His act made him the face of the Anti-Mandal agitation then. This further sparked a series of self-immolations by other upper-caste college students like him, whose own hopes of getting a government job were now at threat, and led to a formidable student movement against job reservations for Backward Castes in India. Altogether, nearly 200 students committed self-immolations; of these, 62 students succumbed to their burns. The first student protester who died due to self-immolation was Surinder Singh Chauhan on 24 September 1990.

Across northern India, normal business was suspended. Shops were kept closed, and schools and colleges were shut down by student agitators. They attacked government buildings, organised rallies and demonstrations and clashed with the police. Incidents of police firing was reported in six states during agitation, claiming more than 50 lives.

The mountainous region (present day Uttarakhand) of Uttar Pradesh saw multiple protests after the implementation of OBC reservation in Uttar Pradesh (covering current Uttarakhand). The Hills had abysmal educational infrastructure with Govt Job the only option. Although, OBC constituted a major chunk of population in the plains of Uttar Pradesh, the Demography was quite different in the Hills. The population in Hills mainly consisted of Upper Caste, SC and ST with hardly any OBC presence. However, the implementation meant 27% seats in Schools/colleges/Govt Jobs would now go on to the people from Plains. The implementation was one of the reason that intensified the statehood movement of Uttarakhand.

However, according to Ramachandra Guha, the agitation did not gain as much traction in southern India as it did in the North due to certain reasons. Firstly, people in the South were more agreeable to the implementation of the Mandal report recommendations as affirmative action programmes had long been in existence there. Furthermore, while in the South the upper castes constituted less than 10 per cent of the population, the figure in the North was in excess of 20 per cent. Lastly, as the region had a thriving industrial sector, the educated youth in the South were not as dependent on government employment as those in the North.

The first recommendation to implement OBC reservation in 27% of jobs under the central government and public sector undertakings was implemented by V. P. Singh. However, the second recommendation to implement OBC reservation in 27% of seats in higher education institutions was implemented in 2006 under UPA government.

After the State Assembly elections in Tamil Nadu, Kerala, Puducherry, Assam and West Bengal in 2006, the Union Minister of Human Resource Development, Arjun Singh promised to reserve 27% seats for Other Backward Class in All India Institutes of Medical Sciences (AIIMS), Indian Institutes of Technology (IITs), National Institutes of Technology (NITs), Indian Institutes of Management (IIMs), Indian Institute of Science (IISc) and other central institutions of higher education. The Ninety-third Amendment of the Constitution of India that was introduced by the First Manmohan Singh ministry, granted a 27% reservation for Other Backward Classes in all Central Government institutions.

The 2006 Indian anti-reservation protests took place in opposition to the decision of the Union Government of India to implement reservations for the Other Backward Classes (OBCs) in central and private institutes of higher education.

Finally, the protests ended when the Supreme Court of India upheld the reservations in its landmark judgement. On 10 April 2008, in the Ashoka Kumar Thakur v. Union of India case, the Supreme Court upheld the Ninety-third Constitutional Amendment and Central Educational Institutions(CEIs) (Reservation in Admission) Act, 2006, for the provision of 27% quota for candidates belonging to the Other Backward Classes in IITs, NITs, IIMs, AIIMS, IISc and other premier educational institutions. But it directed the government to exclude the "creamy layer", families whose annual salary in more than ₹4,50,000, among the OBCs while implementing the law. However, the "creamy layer" exclusion would not be applied to the SC/STs.

== Criticisms ==
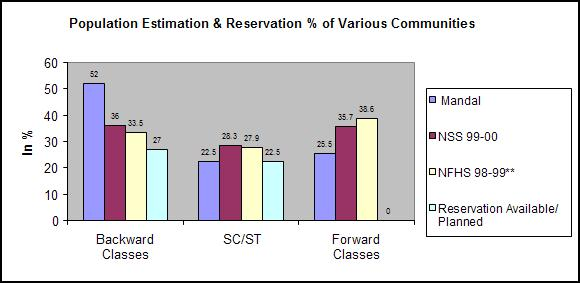
**NFHS Survey estimated only Hindu OBC population. Total OBC population derived by assuming Muslim OBC population in same proportion as Hindu OBC population.

The National Sample Survey puts the figure at 32%. There is substantial debate over the exact number of OBC's in India, with census data compromised by partisan politics. It is generally estimated to be sizeable, but lower than the figures quoted by either the Mandal Commission or the National Sample Survey.

There is also a debate about the estimation logic used by the Mandal Commission for calculating OBC population. Yogendra Yadav, psephologist turned politician, agrees that there is no empirical basis to the Mandal figure. According to Yadav, "It is a mythical construct based on reducing the number of SC/ST, Muslims and others and then arriving at a number." Yadav argues that government jobs were availed to those who by their own means had got higher education, and that reservation for OBC's was only one of the many recommendations of the Mandal Commission, which largely remain unimplemented after 25 years.

The National Sample Survey's 1999–2000 round estimated around 36 percent of the country's population as belonging to the Other Backward Class (OBC). The proportion falls to 32 per cent on excluding Muslim OBCs. A survey conducted in 1998 by National Family Health Statistics (NFHS) puts the proportion of non-Muslim OBCs as 29.8 per cent.

L R Naik, the only Dalit member in the Mandal Commission refused to sign the Mandal recommendations. Naik argued that intermediate backward classes are relatively powerful, while depressed backward classes, or most backward classes (MBCs) remain economically marginalised.

As the debate on OBC reservations spreads, a few interesting facts which raise pertinent question are already apparent. To begin with, figures on the proportion of OBCs in the Indian population vary widely. According to the Mandal Commission (1980) it is 52 percent. According to 2001 census of India, out of India's population of 1,028,737,436 the Scheduled Castes account for 166,635,700 and Scheduled Tribes 84,326,240; that is 16.2% and 8.2% respectively. There is nocoss data on OBCs in the census. However, according to National Sample Survey's 1999–2000 round around 36 per cent of the country's population is defined as belonging to the Other Backward Classes (OBC). The proportion falls to 32 per cent on excluding Muslim OBCs. A survey conducted in 1998 by National Family Health Statistics (NFHS) puts the proportion of non-Muslim OBCs as 29.8 per cent. The NSSO data also shows that already 23.5 per cent of college seats are occupied by OBCs. That's just 8.6 per cent short of their share of population according to the same survey.

Moreover, as per 2006 National Commission for Backward Classes report the number of backward castes in Central list of OBCs has increased to 5,013 (without the figures for most of the Union Territories) from 3,743 identified by the Mandal commission.

== See also ==
- Backwardism
- Forward caste
- Mandal Commission protests of 1990
- 2006 Indian anti-reservation protests
- Reservation in India
- Dalit
