= One Hundred and Third Amendment of the Constitution of India =

The Constitution (One Hundred and Third Amendment) Act, 2019

Parliament of India
- Long title: An Act further to amend the Constitution of India.
- Citation: 103rd Amendment Act of the Indian Constitution
- Territorial extent: India
- Passed by: Lok Sabha
- Passed: 8 January 2019
- Passed by: Rajya Sabha
- Passed: 9 January 2019
- Assented to: 12 January 2019
- Commenced: 14 January 2019

Legislative history

Initiating chamber: Lok Sabha
- Bill title: The Constitution (One Hundred and Twenty-fourth Amendment) Bill, 2019
- Bill citation: Bill No. 3 of 2019
- Introduced by: Thawar Chand Gehlot
- Introduced: 8 January 2019
- Status: In force

The One Hundred and Third Amendment of the Constitution of India, officially known as the Constitution (One Hundred and Third Amendment) Act, 2019, introduces 10% reservation for Economically Weaker Sections (EWS) of society for admission to Central Government-run educational institutions and private educational institutions (except for minority educational institutions), and for employment in Central Government jobs. The Amendment does not make such reservations mandatory in State Government-run educational institutions or State Government jobs. However, some states have chosen to implement the 10% reservation for economically weaker sections.

Currently, the quota can be availed by persons with an annual gross household income of up to ₹800,000 (US$8,300). Families that own over 5 acres of agricultural land, a house over 1,000 square feet, a plot of over 100-yards in a notified municipal area or over a 200-yards plot in a non-notified municipal area cannot avail the reservation. Persons belonging to communities that already have reservations such as Scheduled Castes, Scheduled Tribes and the "non creamy layer" of Other Backward Classes are also not eligible for reservation under this quota(creamy layer of OBC crosses 800,000 limit).

== Legislative history ==
The bill of Constitution (One Hundred and Third Amendment) Act, 2019 was introduced in the Lok Sabha on 8 January 2019 as the Constitution (One Hundred and Twenty-fourth Amendment) Bill, 2019. It was introduced by Thawar Chand Gehlot, Minister of Social Justice and Empowerment. The bill sought to amend Articles 15 and 16 of the constitution.

The bill was passed by the Lok Sabha on 9 January 2019, the last day of the House's winter session. The bill received overwhelming support from the 326 members present with 323 votes in favour and only 3 members voting against. Prime Minister Narendra Modi called the passage of the bill a "landmark moment in our nation's history".

The Bill was tabled in the Rajya Sabha the following day. The House rejected 5 amendments proposed by members of the Opposition. Dravida Munnetra Kazhagam (DMK) MP Kanimozhi moved a motion, supported by Left parties, to refer the Bill to a parliamentary select committee. The motion was rejected receiving 18 votes in favour, 155 against, and one abstention. The Bill, as passed by the Lok Sabha, was passed by the Rajya Sabha on 10 January 2019 with 165 votes in favour and 7 against.

The Bill received assent from President Ram Nath Kovind on 12 January 2019. It was notified in The Gazette of India on the same date. The 103rd Amendment came into effect on 14 January 2019.

== Constitutional challenge ==
Within hours of the bill passing the Rajya Sabha, non-governmental organization Youth For Equality filed a PIL challenging the Bill in the Supreme Court. The NGO argues that the Bill violates the basic structure of the Constitution which they claim does not permit reservation based on economic factors. They also argue that a previous Supreme Court judgement had fixed the maximum reservation allowed under all quotas at 50%. The 103rd Amendment raises the total reservation quota to 59.5%. The DMK filed a motion in the Madras High Court challenging the Amendment on 18 January 2019. The party argues that reservations should be based on the community to which an individual belongs and not their economic status.

On 8 February 2019, a Supreme Court bench headed by Chief Justice Ranjan Gogoi declined to pass a stay on the Amendment, but agreed to hear the petitions challenging the Amendment.

Attorney-General K. K. Venugopal defended the government's position before a three judge bench of the Supreme Court on 31 July 2019 arguing that the 103rd Amendment was "necessitated to benefit the economically weaker sections of the society who were not covered within the existing schemes of reservation, which as per statistics, constituted a considerably large segment of the Indian population." Venugopal noted that Article 46 of the Directive Principles of State Policy commands the State to promote with special care the educational and economic interests of the weaker sections of the population and protect them from social injustice. The Attorney-General also added, "In the country’s higher educational system, private unaided institutions play an important role providing education to over 13.4 million students in various programmes. It is therefore essential that the socially and economically weaker section gets access to these facilities as mandated in the Constitution." The bench led by Justice S.A. Bobde declared that the Court would reserve its orders and decide whether to refer the matter to a Constitution Bench. The Court declined to pass a stay order and the 103rd Amendment remains in effect. In August 2020, the case was referred to five-judge Constitution Bench for hearing.

== Implementation ==
Gujarat Chief Minister Vijay Rupani announced that Gujarat would implement the 10% reservation policy beginning 14 January 2019, becoming the first state to implement the law. Telangana Chief Secretary S.K. Joshi said on 14 January that the state would also implement the Amendment, but would consider making some changes that differ with the Amendment.

== Supreme Court verdict ==
On 7 November 2022, Supreme Court of India by a 3:2 verdict in Janhit Abhiyan vs Union Of India Writ Petition (Civil) No(S). 55 OF 2019, upheld the validity of the 103rd constitutional amendment carried out to provide legal sanction carve out 10% reservation for the economically weaker sections from unreserved classes for admission in educational institutions and government jobs and held that the 50% cap on quota is not inviolable and affirmative action on economic basis may go a long way in eradicating caste-based reservation. This constitutional amendment pushed the total reservation to 59.50% in central institutions.

== See also ==
- 101st Constitution Amendment
- 102nd Constitution Amendment
