= One Hundred and Second Amendment of the Constitution of India =

The Constitution (One Hundred and Second Amendment) Act, 2018

Parliament of India
- Long title: An Act further to amend the Constitution of India.
- Citation: Act No. ? of 2018
- Territorial extent: India
- Passed by: Lok Sabha
- Passed: 2 August 2018
- Passed by: Rajya Sabha
- Passed: 8 August 2018
- Assented to: 11 August 2018

Legislative history

Initiating chamber: Lok Sabha
- Bill title: The Constitution (One Hundred and Twenty-third Amendment) Bill, 2017
- Bill citation: Bill No. 71 of 2017
- Introduced by: Thawar Chand Gehlot
- Introduced: 5 April 2017

Revising chamber: Rajya Sabha
- Bill title: The Constitution (One Hundred and Twenty-third Amendment) Bill, 2017
- Received from the Lok Sabha: 11 April 2017
- Member(s) in charge: Thawar Chand Gehlot
- Committee report: Report of the Select Committee

Final stages
- Reported from conference committee: 19 July 2017
- Conference committee bill passed by Rajya Sabha: 31 July 2017

Related legislation
- National Commission for Backward Classes (Repeal) Act, 2018
- Status: In force

The One Hundred and Second Amendment of the Constitution of India, officially known as the Constitution (One Hundred and Second Amendment) Act, 2018, granted constitutional status to the National Commission for Backward Classes (NCBC).

== Legislative history ==
The bill of the Constitution (One Hundred and Second Amendment) Act, 2018 was introduced in the Lok Sabha on 5 April 2017 as the Constitution (One Hundred and Twenty-third Amendment) Bill, 2017. It was introduced by Thawar Chand Gehlot, Minister of Social Justice and Empowerment.

The bill was passed by the Lok Sabha on 10 April 2017. The bill was introduced in the Rajya Sabha the following day. The House adopted a motion to refer the Bill to a Standing Committee composed of 25 members and chaired by Bhupender Yadav. The Select Committee tabled its report before the Rajya Sabha on 19 July 2017.

The Rajya Sabha passed the Bill on 31 July 2017, after making one amendment. The Bill was transmitted back to the Lok Sabha for concurrence. However, the House did not adopt the amendment made by the Rajya Sabha and instead adopted alternate amendments to the Bill and passed it on 2 August 2018. The Bill, as passed by the Lok Sabha, was passed unanimously by the Rajya Sabha on 8 August 2018 receiving 156 ayes from all members present and voting.

The Bill received assent from President Ram Nath Kovind on 11 August 2018. It was notified in The Gazette of India on the same date.

=== Judicial pronouncements ===
On May 5, 2021, in the hearing of Maharashtra State Reservation for Socially and Educationally Backward Classes (SEBC) Act, 2018 which extends reservation to the Maratha community in public education and employment the Supreme Court of India upheld this constitutional amendment.

== See also ==
- 101st Constitution Amendment
- 103rd Constitution Amendment
