= Mandal Commission protests of 1990 =

Protest against reservation in India

Mandal commission protests of 1990 were against reservation in government jobs based on caste in India.

== Background ==
=== Mandal Commission ===
Mandal Commission was set up in 1977 January by Morarji Desai government to identify the socially or educationally backward classes to consider the question of seat reservations and quotas for people to redress caste discrimination, and used eleven social, economic, and educational indicators to determine backwardness. It was chaired by B. P. Mandal. The commission submitted the report to the President on 30 December 1980. It recommended 27% reservation quota for OBC resulting in total 49.5% quota in government jobs and public universities. V. P. Singh, the Prime Minister implemented the recommendations in August 1990, by reserving 27% of jobs under the central government and public sector undertakings which led to protests.

== Protests ==
These protests were against giving government jobs to certain castes to rectify historical injustices they faced. These protests closed roads, highways, transportation services, government services, schools, and businesses of India. Anti-reservationists protested. Student protests were planned publicly, and in advance. Protest events were photographed for many published articles of newspapers locally and nationally. Protests began during the year when the eleven-year-old Mandal Commission was opened to bring into effect new government employment opportunities, reservation for backwards classes.

Between the failure to effectively control the political cost of the protests escalating enough to close parts of the nation, and an eleven-year-old human rights improvement project, were causes that ultimately led to accepting the resignation of the Janata Dal party's Prime Minister of India, V. P. Singh.

Culturally unique features of the protests and riots were bandhs (a version of a strike), hartals (a version of a municipal shut-down), dharnas (a version of swarming). Incidents of destruction of public property, looting, and intimidation for bandhs, hartals and dharnas were published and listed geographically as travel information in newspaper articles. Articles also highlighted politicians and victims of rioting during the protests. Although not advisable, late summer travel by airline and vehicle during the protests was possible without delays, between capitals New Delhi and Chandigarh, and Shimla for example. Police prevented extending the range and duration of the strikes, and some strike activity from even occurring. The strike helped to give large popularity to Mandal Commission report and fueled the political grouping of the OBC castes, which later helped a lot for the strengthening of regional political parties and stronger parties other than Congress and BJP.

== Self immolations ==
=== Rajiv Goswami ===
Rajiv Goswami was the first student to attempt self-immolation while a student at Deshbandhu College, Delhi University in October, 1990 to protest against Prime Minister V.P. Singh's implementation of the Mandal Commission laws for Affirmative Action (reservation) recommendations. His action sparked a series of self-immolations by college students and led to a formidable movement against job reservations for backward classes, as recommended by the Mandal Commission. He was later elected as the President of Delhi University's Student Union, he died after about a decade of suffering because of the 70% burns he had suffered.

=== Wave of suicide protests ===
While Goswami survived, he became the face of the agitation, and more immolation bids followed soon. The historian Ramachandra Guha puts that number at 200; more than 60 succumbed to their burns. Some other reports put these suicide attempts to 159, with 63 succumbing to their injuries. Other prominent victims include Monica Chadha (19, New Delhi), Anil Kumar (15, Tekri, Haryana), Saurabh Verma (20, Indore), Surinder Singh Chauhan (22, New Delhi; first fatality), Susarla Vamsee Mohan (20, Hyderabad), Narinder Kaur (16, Pathankot), Saroj Saini (15, Chandigarh), Shama Gupta (Chandigarh), Chetan Gautam (13), Aparna Deshpande (Jabalpur), and Ravindra Kumar (Jabalpur).

== Popular culture ==
- 2010 TV series Armanon Ka Balidaan-Aarakshan had backdrop of these protests.
- Hurdang (2022) by Nikhil Nagesh Bhat is set in the backdrop of the protests.

== See also ==
- Influence of Jat-Political conciliation
- Rise of Jotedar principalities
- Patidar reservation agitation
