= Ashoka Kumar Thakur v. Union of India =

Indian public interest litigation case

Ashoka Kumar Thakur v. Union of India is an Indian public interest litigation case challenging the Ninety-third Constitutional Amendment and the Central Educational Institutions (CEIs) (Reservation in Admission) Act, 2006. Reservations for underprivileged persons in public institutions is one of the policies devised by the Indian Legislature to espouse the cause of the disadvantaged.

In the year of 2006, the United Progressive Alliance government, under Human Resource Development Minister, Arjun Singh introduced an additional 27% reservation for Other Backward Classes in higher educational institutions. The said move was met with some severe criticism from certain quarters of the society especially from the student community and was challenged in the Supreme Court of India.

== Facts ==
In April 2006, the United Progressive Alliance government, under Human Resource Development Minister, Arjun Singh decided to reserve nearly 27% of seats for students from the OBC segment in institutes of higher learning in India. This would have reduced the seats for a general, unreserved candidate to about 50% (after taking into account other reserved seats). The Indian parliament passed a bill to bring out an amendment in the constitution in this regard. Thakur challenged the validity of the amendments.

The Supreme Court of India in response to the PIL refused to stay the constitutional amendment but issued notice to the government. The government which had faced strong anti reservation protests on its turn stated that the reservation policy would not be implemented until a bill (The Central Educational Institutions (Reservation in Admission) Bill, 2006) introduced in the parliament in August 2006 for this purpose becomes a law. The bill was later approved by the parliament.

The Supreme Court, as an interim measure, stayed the operation of admission to medical and professional institutions for OBC's under the 27% quota category for the year 2007-2008 and directed that all cases (including this one) should be listed for the third week of August for final hearing and disposal on the issue. The Court held that the 1931 census could not be a determinative factor for identifying OBCs for the purpose of providing reservation. However, it clarified that the benefit of reservation for the Scheduled Castes and Scheduled Tribes could not be withheld and the Centre can go ahead with the identification process to determine the backward classes.

On 10 April 2008, the Supreme Court of India upheld the Government's 27% OBC quotas in Government funded institutions. The Court categorically reiterated its prior stand that "Creamy Layer" should be excluded from the ambit of reservation policy and private institutions are also not to be included in. The verdict produced mixed reactions. Several criteria to identify creamy layer has been recommended, which are as follows:

Those with family income above Rs 250,000 a year should be in creamy layer, and excluded from the reservation quota. Also, children of doctors, engineers, chartered accountants, actors, consultants, media professionals, writers, bureaucrats, defence officers of colonel and equivalent rank or higher, high court and Supreme Court judges, all central and state government Class A and B officials. The court has requested Parliament to exclude MPs’ and MLAs’ children, too.

== Judgement ==
1. The Supreme Court upheld that the Constitution (Ninety-Third Amendment) Act, 2005 does not violate the "basic structure" of the Constitution so far as it relates to 27% reservation for Other Backward Classes in the state maintained institutions and aided educational institutions.

2. The Court emphasized that the "creamy layer" (the wealthier and more socially advanced members of OBCs) should be excluded from the benefits of reservations. This was done to ensure that the benefits of reservations reach the most disadvantaged sections of OBCs.

3. The Court balanced the need for social justice through reservations with the principle of merit, stating that reservations do not violate the fundamental right to equality as enshrined in the Constitution. It also highlighted that merit should not be seen solely through marks but also in the context of social and economic inequalities.

4. The Court rejected the argument that the 1931 census data, which was outdated, could serve as the sole basis for determining the OBC population. It encouraged the government to gather more current and reliable data to implement reservations.

5. While upholding the 27% reservation policy, the Court stressed the need for periodic review to ensure that the policy serves its intended purpose.

== See also ==
- 2006 Indian anti-reservation protests
