= Youth For Equality =

Indian organisation

- Abbreviation: YFE
- Formation: April 4, 2006
- Founded at: New Delhi. India
- Type: National policy influencing Body
- Location: India
- Website: www.youthforequality.in

Youth For Equality is an Indian organisation against caste-based policies and reservations, i.e. affirmative action. It was founded by students in a number of Indian universities in 2006. It organises demonstrations and legal challenges against caste-based policies.

== History ==
Youth for Equality was founded on April 4, 2006 by students from All India Institutes of Medical Sciences, Indian Institutes of Technology, Jawaharlal Nehru University, Indian Institutes of Management, and other central universities, amidst the protests against The Constitution (93rd Amendment) Act 2005 and Central Educational Institutions(CEIs) (Reservation in Admission) Act, 2006 that was introduced by the First Manmohan Singh ministry, which had granted a 27% reservation for Other Backward Classes in all Central Government institutions. Youth for Equality organised massive anti-reservation demonstrations, where students engage in street protests across India.

Later on, Youth for Equality took legal action against the Act, claiming that it violated the Basic Structure of the Constitution of India. In March 2007, the Supreme Court of India granted an injunction to suspension of OBC reservations. In April 2008, an 11-member constitutional bench of the Supreme Court upheld and reinstated the Act in a 7-4 judgement delivered by Chief Justice India K. G. Balakrishnan, with Justice Dalveer Bhandari providing the dissenting opinion. OBC reservations were implemented in all central universities and institutions, but the government was required to exclude the creamy layer from the OBC (but not SC/ST) reservations.

Youth For Equality contested in the Jawaharlal Nehru University Students' Union elections in 2006 and 2009 and Lok Sabha elections in 2009.

In 2014, Youth For Equality challenged the Maratha reservations instituted by the Government of Maharashtra.

On 10 January 2019, the group petitioned the Supreme Court against the Constitution (124th Amendment) Bill 2019, which had increased the cap on reservations from 50% to 60%, to accommodate the newly defined Economically Weaker Sections, arguing that the law would violate the Supreme Court ruling in Indra Sawhney & Others v. Union of India. On 6 August 2020, the court decided that a 5-member bench would hear the case. In 2023, Youth for Equality group petitioned against Bihar caste-based survey 2023.
