= 2006 elections in India =

Elections in India
- 2006

== Results ==
Date(s)	State	Government before election	Chief Minister before election	Government after election	Chief Minister after election	Maps
4 and 11 April 2006	Assam	Indian National Congress	Tarun Gogoi	Indian National Congress	Tarun Gogoi	
4 and 11 April 2006	Assam	Indian National Congress	Tarun Gogoi	Bodoland People's Front	Tarun Gogoi	
22 April, 29 April and 3 May 2006	Kerala	Indian National Congress	Oommen Chandy	Communist Party of India (Marxist)	V. S. Achuthanandan	
8 May 2006	Pondicherry	Indian National Congress	N. Rangaswamy	Indian National Congress	N. Rangaswamy	
8 May 2006	Pondicherry	Dravida Munnetra Kazhagam	N. Rangaswamy	Dravida Munnetra Kazhagam	N. Rangaswamy	
8 May 2006	Tamil Nadu	All India Anna Dravida Munnetra Kazhagam	J. Jayalalithaa	Dravida Munnetra Kazhagam	M. Karunanidhi	
8 May 2006	Tamil Nadu	All India Anna Dravida Munnetra Kazhagam	J. Jayalalithaa	Indian National Congress	M. Karunanidhi	
17 April – 8 May 2006	West Bengal	Communist Party of India (Marxist)	Buddhadeb Bhattacharya	Communist Party of India (Marxist)	Buddhadeb Bhattacharya	

== Legislative Assembly elections ==
Indian states of Assam, West Bengal, Kerala and Tamil Nadu

The State Assembly elections in India of 2006 took place between April 3, 2006, and May 8, 2006. The Indian states that went into poll are Assam, Kerala, Tamil Nadu, West Bengal and Puducherry.

Counting of votes for all the states was completed on May 11, 2006, and results were declared on May 20, 2006.

=== Assam ===
Assam, India

Elections in Assam for 65 ACs occurred on April 3, 2006, and another 61 ACs on April 10, 2006.

=== Jammu and Kashmir ===
Winner, runner-up, voter turnout, and victory margin in every constituency
Assembly Constituency		Turnout	Winner				Runner Up				Margin
#k	Names	%	Candidate	Party	Votes	%	Candidate	Party	Votes	%	Margin
1	Sangrama	63.31%	Shuib Nabi	Independent	18,526	.88%	Javid Hassan Beigh	JKPDP	12,208	6.61%	6,318
2	Pattan	68.97%	Sheikh Mustafa Kamal	JKNC	26,736	1.89%	Iftikhar Hussain Ansari	JKPDP	23,969	45.51%	2,767
3	Rafiabad	75.52%	Mohammad Dilawar Mir	JKPDP	28,138	2.46%	Mohammed Maqbool Mir	JKNC	19,479	55.59%	8,659
4	Bhaderwah	72.54%	Ghulam Nabi Azad	INC	62,072	6.13%	Dhantar Singh	Independent	4,057	93.87%	58,015

=== Kerala ===
Kerala, India

Political Alliance	No. of Seats	Popular Vote %
LDF	98	48.63%
UDF	42	42.98%
Source: Indian Elections / Election Commission of India.

Elections in Kerala for 65 ACs occurred on April 22, 2006, 61 ACs on April 29, 2006, and 15 ACs on May 3, 2006. The Communist Party of India (Marxist) (CPI(M))-led Left Democratic Front beat the incumbent Indian National Congress-led United Democratic Front by a margin of 56 seats (out of a total of 140 seats). V.S. Achuthanandan, of CPI (M) was sworn in as the 20th Chief Minister of Kerala, on May 18, 2006.

=== Tamil Nadu ===
Tamil Nadu, India

Political Alliance	No. of Seats	Assembly Seat %
DMK+	163	69.6%
AIADMK+	69	29.4%
Independent/Other	2	0.8%
Source: Indian Elections / Election Commission of India.

Elections in Tamil Nadu for 234 ACs occurred in a single phase on May 8, 2006. The Dravida Munnetra Kazhagam (DMK)-led front won the elections, beating the incumbent All India Anna Dravida Munnetra Kazhagam (AIADMK)-led government. The DMK leader, M Karunanidhi was sworn in as chief minister.

=== West Bengal ===
West Bengal, India

Elections in West Bengal for 45 ACs occurred on April 17, 2006, 66 ACs on April 22, 2006, 77 ACs on April 27, 2006, 57 ACs on May 3, 2006, 49 ACs on May 8, 2006.

=== Puducherry ===
Elections in Puducherry for 3 ACs occurred on May 3, 2006, and 27 ACs on May 8, 2006.
