= Goan Sports Association =

Association in Mumbai, India

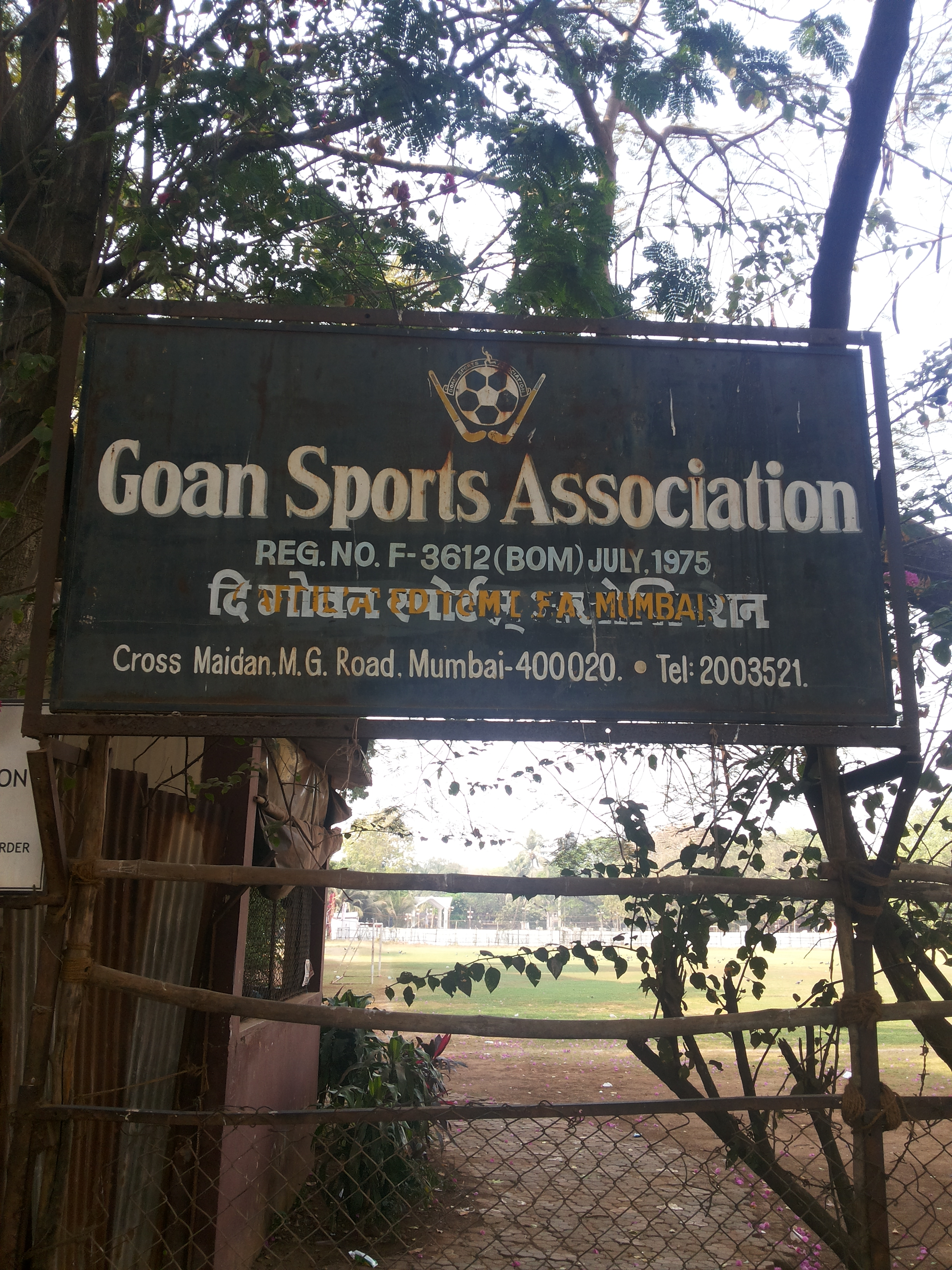
Goan Sports Association at the city that used to be called Bombay.

The Goan Sports Association is the name of a club (later association) and sporting grounds founded in 1929 in Mumbai (formerly known as Bombay), India

== Location ==
It is located at Cross Maidan at Dhobi Talao in Mumbai 400002, behind Fashion Street, in the central and downtown part of the city.

== History ==
This association, earlier known as a club, had been established in 1929 to promote sports in the bustling megapolis and was the apex body of several sports associations. Football, being a popular sport in the "parent State of Goa", here too the club had been promoting this sport on the ground for the past four-and-half decades. This had meant "thousands of players, schools and colleges in Mumbai have benefited from using the playground", it was claimed by supporters of this group.

In a petition made before the courts, the supporters of this association said the players trained by the association were participating in various international and national sport events. The lease was extended in 2004 for 30 years up to 2033.

In 2012, news reports spoke about the upgraded medical facilities there.

== Home for competition ==
Goan Sports Association (GSA) grounds has been the venue for a number of football tournaments. For instance, in March 2012, it was the venue for the 15th Goan Sports Association (GSA) veterans’ football tournament for the Late Aniceto Fernandes Memorial Trophy, the Super Division play-off matches, among others.

Goa Sports Association has its hockey team too, which was in the Third Division in 2013. This hockey team was in the Mumbai first division in 2016.

== Court case ==
In March 2013, however, news reports said the Bombay High Court was to then hear a petition by the Goan Sports Association challenging the termination of its lease from a 1,40,000 square feet plot near Cross Maidan. Judges S J Vazifdar and Justice Mridula Bhatkar were to then hear the association's petition challenging the 21 December 2012 government resolution terminating the lease dead of the plot and directing the deputy director of the Sports and Youth Service, Mumbai division, to take further action for recovery of dues and taking possession of the ground.
