= Shitole =

Maratha clan

Shitole is a landed gentry Maratha clan found largely in Maharashtra, Karnataka and nearby regions of India.The Shitole (शितोळे) family is a prominent Maratha clan with roots in the Maratha Empire, known for their involvement in military and political affairs. They were descendants of the same lineage as the famous Bhosale family, with the Shitole family branch being associated with Pune and Hinganis, a region known for its military service under the Maratha rulers.

== History ==
Under the Sultanates of Deccan during the pre-Shivaji era, Shitoles were administrators of more than three hundred villages near Pune. They were the Maratha's revenue collector in Maratha history.

== Branches ==
The Shitoles served Kolhapur Princely State of Chhatrapatis through Sardar Sultanji Shitole, Sardar Appajirao Shitole, Sardar khetroji Shitole, Sardar Mahadaji Shitole Sardar Naroji Shitole Sardar Baji Shitole and Sardar Tukoji Shitole, Baburao Anandrao Shitole Nowadays they carry clan names of Shitole, Davne, Aalat, Kawalkar, Jane, Jalambakar, Jawalkar, Davte, Dahee, Dandghor, Daoodpure, Datarkar, Danee, Dave, Dhandar, Bhagde, Bhunvar, Bhete, Bhute, Munjewar, Murkute, Murkund, Male, Rahane, Lambat, Lat, Avhale.

== See also ==
- Maratha clan system

== Sources ==
- Adarsh Seva Sangha (1977). Rural India. Vol. 40. R. G. Gupta.
- George Kurian (1974). The family in India: a regional view. Vol. 12. Mouton.
- R.S. Chaurasia (1 January 2004). History of the Marathas. Atlantic Publishers & Dist. pp. 44–. ISBN 978-81-269-0394-8.
- Govind Sakharam Sardesai. New History of the Marathas: The expansion of the Maratha power, 1707–1772. Phoenix Publications.
