= Maratha reservation agitation =

Movement for Maratha caste reservations

Maratha Aarakshan Chalwal (English: Maratha reservation movement), also known as Maratha Aarakshan movement, is a long-running campaign by the Maratha community in Maharashtra, seeking to be recognized as OBC to avail quotas in education and government jobs. The demand, which began in the early 1980s, intensified after incidents of violence and social unrest, notably following the Kopardi gang rape and murder of a Maratha girl in Kopardi. The Maharashtra government granted 16% reservation to the Maratha community in 2018, but legal challenges have repeatedly affected its implementation. In 2021, the Supreme Court ruled the reservation unconstitutional, leading to further political and legal battles. As of 2023, the state government has been working on issuing Kunbi caste certificates to Marathas to help them access benefits under the Other Backward Classes (OBC) quota.

== Background ==
The Marathas, a prominent community in Deccan, have historically been regarded as a farmer/warrior caste. Over time, however, the economic conditions of many Marathas, particularly those in lower and middle classes, have declined. The demand for Maratha reservation began in 1981, when Annasaheb Patil, a leader of the Mathadi Labour Union, organised a rally in Mumbai advocating for the cause. Despite this early push, the issue remained largely dormant until the early 2000s.

In 2004, the Maharashtra government included Maratha-Kunbis and Kunbi-Marathas in the Other Backward Class (OBC) category. However, this did not extend to those who identified solely as Marathas, leaving a significant portion of the community without benefits.

The issue gained renewed urgency in 2016 and 2017, particularly following the tragic death of a minor in Kopardi village, Ahmednagar. The Maratha Kranti Morcha led peaceful protests across the state, calling for both reservation and justice for the victim, along with support for farmers. In response, the Maharashtra government formed the NG Gaikwad Commission in 2017 to assess the viability of granting Marathas reservation. The Commission recommended that Marathas be included in the Socially and Educationally Backward Class (SEBC) category.

In 2018, the Maharashtra State Socially and Educationally Backward Class Act was passed, providing 16% reservation for Marathas in education and employment. The move garnered support from various political parties, including the Congress and NCP. However, legal challenges were raised in the Bombay High Court regarding the constitutionality of the reservation, particularly the issue of exceeding the 50% limit for total reservations. The High Court upheld the reservation but reduced it to 13% for jobs and 12% for education.

In 2020, the Supreme Court intervened, ruling that the Maratha quota was unconstitutional and violated the provisions of the Indian Constitution, particularly Article 14. The Court issued a stay, and in May 2021, it quashed the Maratha reservation entirely. Following this, the Maharashtra government instructed economically weaker members of the Maratha community to avail benefits from the Economically Weaker Sections (EWS) quota until the matter was resolved.

== Maratha Kranti Morcha ==
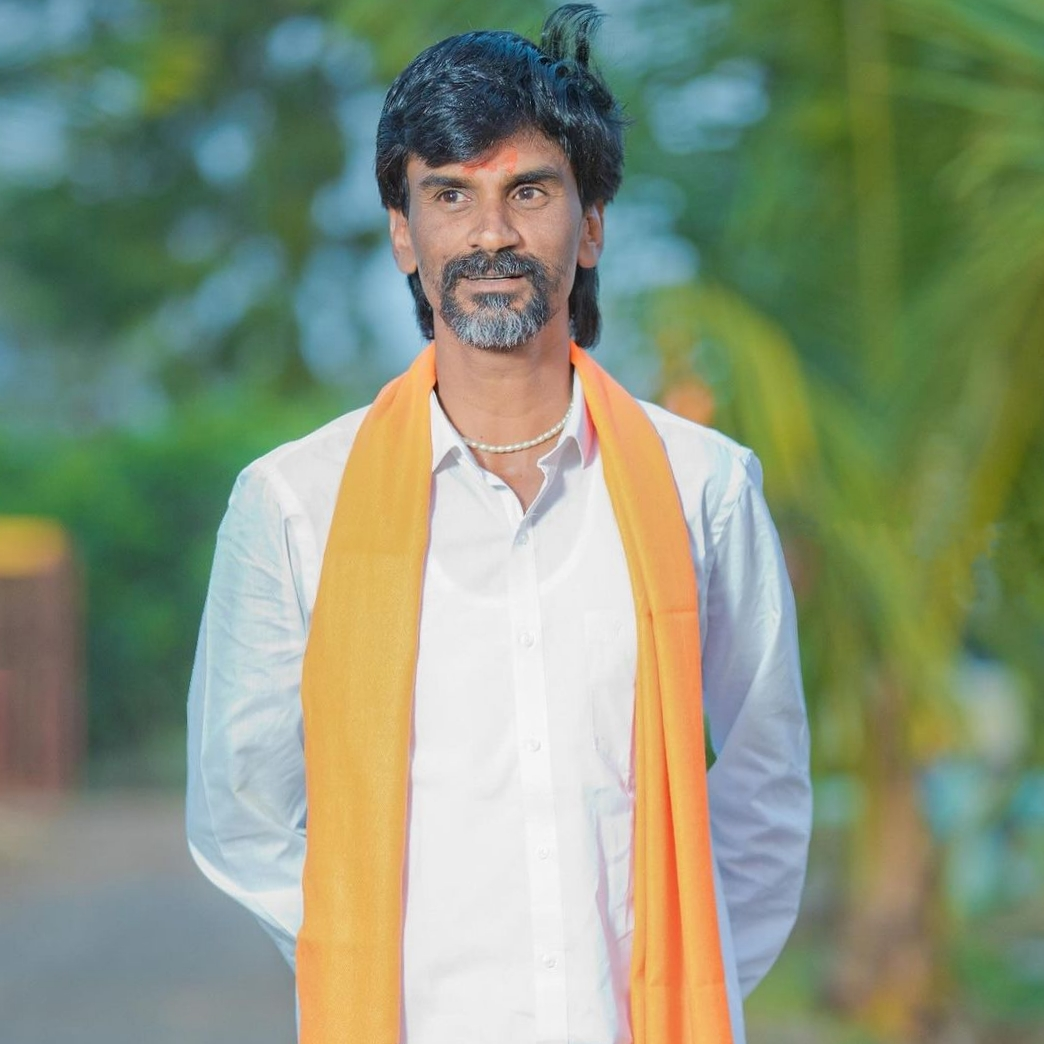
Manoj Jarange Patil

Manoj Jarange, a prominent Maratha social-activist has been working hard to give voice to his fellow Maratha Kunbi community members.

In September 2025, under his leadership thousands of Maratha citizens rushed to Mumbai to protest.

== Timeline ==
- 1980: The demand for reservation for Marathas gained momentum following the submission of the Mandal Commission Report.
- March 1983: The first morcha in Mumbai demanding reservation for Marathas was led by the late Annasaheb Patil, a leader of the Mathadi workers from Satara. (Mathadi workers means head-loaders and coolies)
- February 2014: A committee, headed by Narayan Rane, submitted a report to the UPA Government, led by Prithviraj Chavan, recommending reservation for Marathas.
- June 2014: The UPA Government, under Prithviraj Chavan, approved a proposal to reserve 16 percent of government jobs and educational seats for Marathas, and 5 percent for Muslims.
- November 2014: The Bombay High Court stayed the decision of the UPA government to provide 16 percent reservations to Marathas in government jobs and educational institutions. The NDA Government, headed by Devendra Fadnavis, decided to appeal the decision in the Supreme Court.
- 18 December 2014: The Supreme Court refused to vacate the Bombay High Court's interim order that stayed the Maratha reservation in jobs.
- July 2016: The Kopardi gang rape and murder of a Maratha girl in Kopardi, Ahmednagar district, intensified the demand for Maratha rights.
- August 2016 - 2017: A total of 58 large-scale Maratha morchas were held across the state during this period.
- 2017: A commission, headed by retired Justice M G Gaikwad, recommended that Marathas be granted reservation under the Socially and Economically Backward Class (SEBC) category.
- November 2018: Justice (Retd) NG Gaikwad, Chairman of the Maharashtra State Backward Classes Commission, submitted a report to the government. The government decided to create a special category for Marathas called the Socially and Economically Backward Class (SEBC) for the purpose of reservation. The Maharashtra legislature approved a 16 percent reservation for Marathas.
- June 2019: The Bombay High Court upheld the Maratha reservation, but ruled that the 16 percent quota was not justifiable.
- July 2019: The Supreme Court agreed to urgently hear petitions challenging the constitutional validity of the Maratha reservation law. A bench led by Chief Justice Ranjan Gogoi took note of the submissions.
- May 2021: The Supreme Court struck down the Maratha reservation law while the Uddhav Thackeray led MVA Government was in power.
- November 2022: After the Supreme Court upheld the 10 percent quota for Economically Weaker Section (EWS), the state government stated that until the Maratha reservation issue is resolved, economically weaker members of the Maratha community could benefit from the EWS quota.
- August 2023: Shivba Sanghatana founder Manoj Jarange launched a hunger strike demanding the issuance of Kunbi caste certificates to Marathas in the Marathwada.
- October 2023: The Government of Maharashtra established a committee led by Justice Sandeep Shinde (Retd) to review the records of Maratha Kunbi and Kunbi Maratha entries, and to formulate a procedure for issuing certificates that would enable the community to avail reservation under the OBC category (as of October 2023, 57 lakh records have been found.)
- October 2023: The Eknath Shinde led Mahayuti Government filed a curative petition in the Supreme Court.
- October 2023: The government formed a three-member panel of retired judges—Justice Dilip Bhosale, Justice M G Gaikwad, and Justice Sandeep Shinde—to advise on the progress of the curative petition.
- January 2024: The Mahayuti government expanded the scope of Maratha reservation by issuing Kunbi certificates, thereby enabling Marathas to secure benefits under the OBC quota through the definition of ‘sage-soyare’, a Marathi term for 'relatives from the family tree.'

== See also ==
- Court cases related to reservation in India
- Jat reservation agitation
- Mandal Commission protests of 1990
- Patidar reservation agitation
- Women's Reservation Bill, 2010
