= Maratha Kranti Morcha =

Series of silent protests organized by the Maratha community

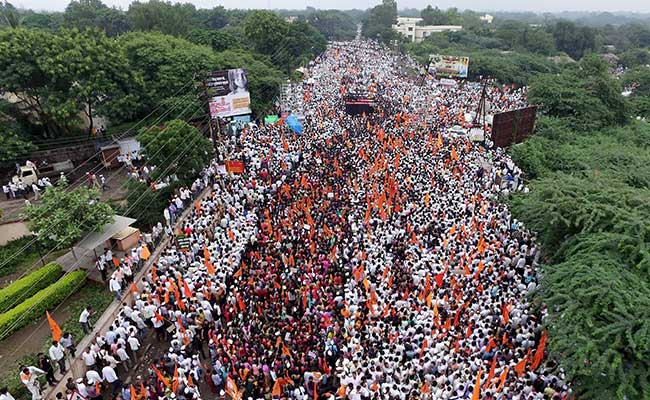
- Organised by: Maratha Community

The Maratha Kranti Morcha, loosely translated as "Maratha revolutionary march" in the Marathi language, was a series of silent and pragmatic protests organized by the Maratha community in various cities across India, and in overseas diaspora communities. Other groups, such as Muslims and other religious minorities, also supported the Morcha. The impetus for the rallies was the rape and murder of a 15-year-old girl in Kopardi village, Maharashtra, on 13 July 2016. The protesters demanded the death sentence for the rapists. The Maratha caste dominate the power and cultural structure in Maharashtra due to the size of their population.

The rallies featured no leaders and no slogans. Millions of people from across Maharashtra came together to protest, and initially no harm was done to any public or private property until January 2017, when a few instances of violence were noted.

The demand for Maratha reservations in educational positions and government jobs were also a part of these protests. At the time, the Bombay High Court had recently upheld the reservations granted to the Maratha community, but also mentioned that the percentage of quotas given wasn't justifiable. Later, the Supreme Court quashed the Maratha community reservations. A large percentage of Marathis are farmers, and the community had been severely affected by droughts and degraded arable land. Due to the lack of reservations, unemployment had become a major problem in the Maratha community. Some castes within the Maratha community, known as Kunbi, did receive the benefits of reservations provided to the Other Backward Class category; however, most people were alleged to have lost their benefits.

== 2016 demands ==
- Punishment of culprits in the Kopardi rape and murder case
- Reservations in educational positions and government jobs
- Implementation of recommendations of the National Commission on Farmers.
- Amendment of Scheduled Caste and Scheduled Tribe (Prevention of Atrocities) Act, 1989 to stop its misuse.

== Influencing factors ==
=== Judicial ===
- On 7 October 2016, 2 month and 24 days after the rape and murder incident, the Ahmednagar Police filed a charge sheet running into over 350 pages before the Ahmednagar sessions court in which the trio was charged under IPC sections 302 (murder), 376 (rape), and relevant sections of the Protection of Children from Sexual Offences Act.
- On 19 October 2016, 3 months to the incident, the Kopardi rape and murder case trial began in the Ahmednagar sessions court. The special public prosecutor and lawyer opened the case by describing the charges of criminal conspiracy to commit rape and murder against all three accused.
- On 18 November 2017, 1 year and 4 months after the incident, the Ahmednagar sessions court convicted the three men on charges of rape, murder, and criminal conspiracy.
- On 29 November 2017, the Ahmednagar sessions court awarded the death sentence to all three convicts.
- On 10 September 2023, the Kopardi rape and murder case convict was found dead inside Pune's Yerawada Jail.

== Silent protests ==
- 9 August 2016 – Aurangabad
- 30 August 2016 – Beed
- 18 September 2016 – Akola
- 19 September 2016 – Jalna
- 21 September 2016 – Navi Mumbai
- 23 September 2016 – Ahmednagar
- 25 September 2016 – Pune
- 25 September 2016 – Yavatmal
- 25 September 2016 – Washim
- 26 September 2016 – Saint Petersburg
- 27 September 2016 – Sangli
- 28 September 2016 – Dhule
- 2 October 2016 – Hyderabad
- 3 October 2016 – Dubai
- 9 October 2016 – Tweet Morcha
- 9 October 2016 – Daman
- 9 October 2016 – Badlapur
- 15 October 2016 – Kolhapur
- 16 October 2016 – Thane
- 16 October 2016 – Chiplun
- 16 October 2016 – New York City
- 19 October 2016 – Chandrapur
- 19 October 2016 – Bidar
- 9 August 2017 – Mumbai

The Maratha Kranti Morcha carried out its largest silent protest in the financial capital of India, Mumbai, on 9 August 2017. Around half a million members of the Maratha community from across the state gathered in Mumbai. The protest started from Jijamata Zoo Byculla and culminated at Azad Maidan in Mumbai. Schools, junior colleges, and about 450 institutes in South Mumbai remained shut. Mumbai's famed Dabbawalas took the day off to participate in the morcha.

During the silent protest, leaders from the Maratha community also warned that they would switch to violent tactics after two weeks if state authorities did not act on their demands.

== Hunger strike ==
=== 2023 ===
Manoj Jarange-Patil, a Maratha quota activist, has been a prominent figure in the Maratha Community's fight for reservation in Maharashtra. He is leading multiple agitations and protests, including dharna and hunger strikes.

=== 2025 ===
Manoj Jarange-Patil demanded reservation for Maratha under the Other Backward Class category. Manoj Jarange-Patil started a hunger strike on 29 August 2025 10:00AM at Azad Maidan in the city of Mumbai to exert pressure on the Chief Minister of Maharashtra Devendra Fadnavis.

- 1st Day: hunger strike was started on 29 August 2025 10:00AM at Azad Maidan Mumbai.

The government provisions were inadequate for basic sanitary facilities for protesters include an adequate supply of clean mobile toilets, regular cleaning and maintenance of these facilities, and provisions for clean drinking water. The essential sanitary facilities were inadequate at all protest sites. An adequate numbers of clean mobile toilets were not provided for all protesters, with a specific focus on the needs of women. The free access to clean drinking water was not provided for all protesters. The waste management system was not implement for regular collection and disposal of solid waste from all protest sites. The basic hygiene items such as bathroom sanitary soap and water was not provided to maintain personal hygiene at all protest sites. The Medical facilities and outreach services with doctors and health professionals was not provided to care and handle referrals. The mental health care and counselling teams was not deployed to support protesters. The climate protection tents or other shelters was not provided to protesters from extreme rainy weather. The street lights were not provided at protest site Azad Maidan Mumbai.

- 2nd Day: hunger strike was continued on 30 August 2025 at Azad Maidan Mumbai.

The Government of Maharashtra rejected Maratha quota reservation under the Other Backward Class category as demanded by Manoj Jarange-Patil Manoj Jarange-Patil warned the Government of Maharashtra that it should not test the patience of the Maratha community.

- 3rd Day: hunger strike was continued on 31 August 2025 at Azad Maidan Mumbai.

As hunger strike of Manoj Jarange-Patil enter in 3rd day, and no prompt action initiated from the Chief Minister of Maharashtra Devendra Fadnavis on Maratha reservations issue, a resentment shown on social media by Maratha commodity with sharing an old statements of Devendra Fadnavis.

"Where there is will, there is a way! Where there is no will, there is survey and report!" - Devendra Fadnavis

- 4th Day: hunger strike was continued on 1 September 2025 at Azad Maidan Mumbai.

Manoj Jarange-Patil renunciate water and continued hunger strike as the Government of Maharashtra not accepting the demands.

- 5th Day: hunger strike was ended on 2 September 2025 at Azad Maidan Mumbai.

Manoj Jarange-Patil hunger strike was continued; a non-violent form of protest to draw judiciary attention to injustices and pressure the Government of Maharashtra to meet demands of reservation for Maratha community under the Other Backward Class category.

The Government of Maharashtra accepted the demands of reservation for Maratha community under the Other Backward Class category by issuing Kunbi caste certificates to eligible individuals of Maratha community as part of the Maratha-Kunbi and Kunbi-Maratha cluster. Manoj Jarange-Patil ended his hunger strike on 5th day after invocation by Radhakrishna Vikhe Patil, the chairman of subcommittee of the Government of Maharashtra.

=== 2026 ===
Manoj Jarange-Patil began again his indefinite hunger strike on date 30 May 2026 morning at his Antarwali Sarati village in Jalna district with demand to provide Kunbi caste certificates based on 5 million Kunbi records that have already been identified by justice Shinde committee. The documents to be displayed at village gram panchayat offices, and that responsibility for implementation should be with the Divisional Commissioner’s office. And disciplinary action should be taken against government officials who fail to issue Kunbi caste certificates despite the existence of valid records. The government should provide financial assistance to families of those who sacrificed their lives during the Maratha reservation movement. The Hyderabad and Satara Gazette records should be implemented. The criminal cases registered against Maratha protesters should be withdraw who participated in the reservation agitation. A separate ministry for the Maratha community should be created.

Manoj Jarange-Patil despite his ill health sat on open ground under scorching summer sun in temperature of 103°F (39°C) and continued his indefinite hunger to put pressure on the Maharashtra government.

In midnight of 30 May 2026 Manoj Jarange-Patil ended his indefinite fast after talk with representatives of Maharashtra government with government decision to implement his demand.

== Rasta Roko Morcha ==
=== 2025 ===
- 31 August 2025 – Hingoli

== Gallery ==
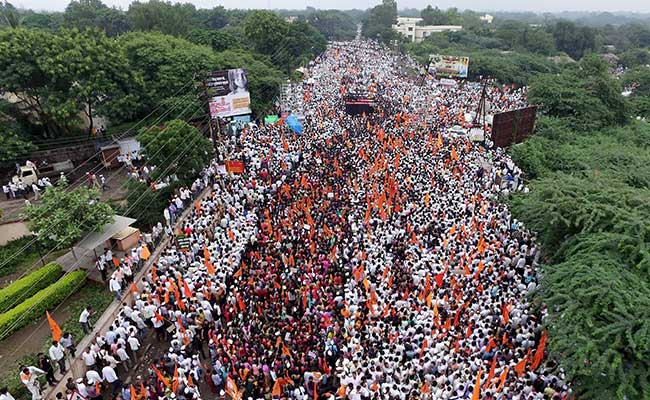

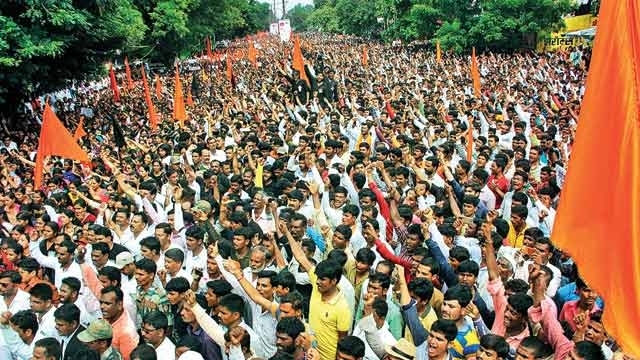

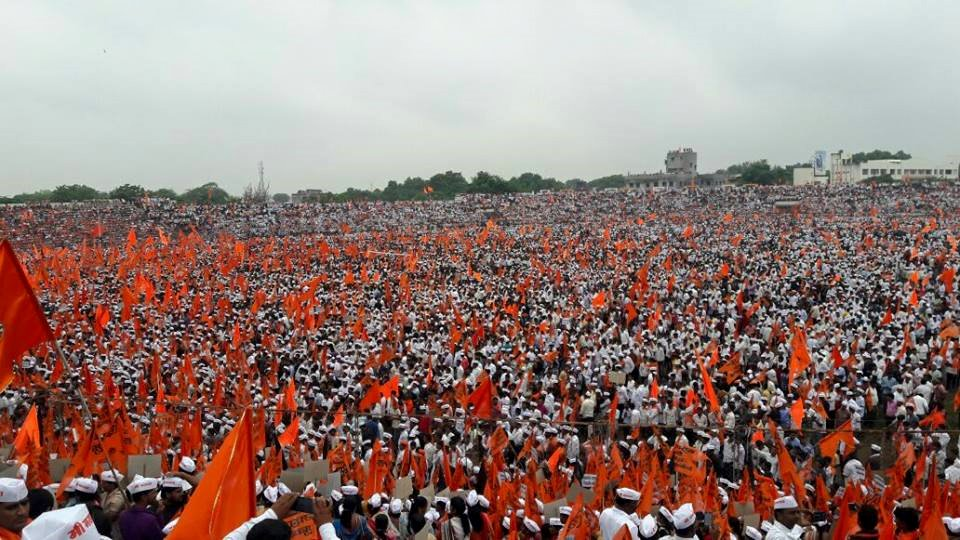

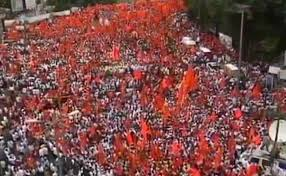

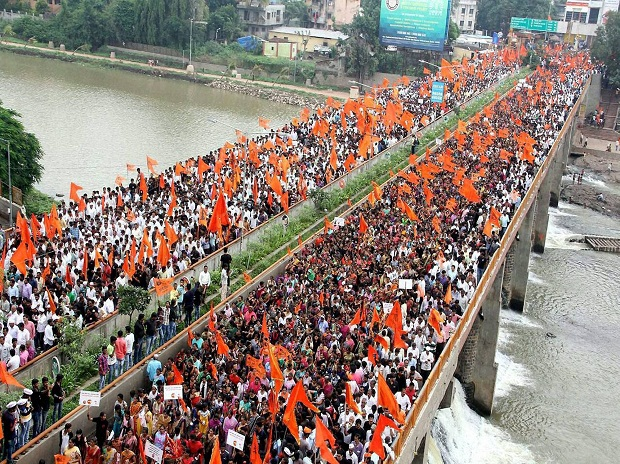

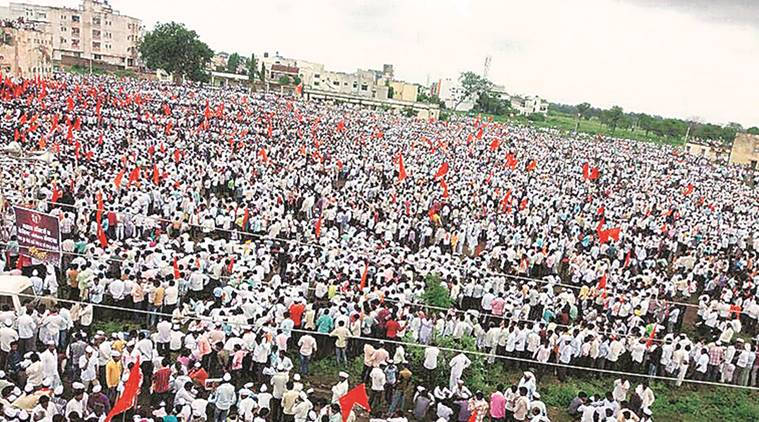

== Violence ==
=== January 2017 ===
Road blockades (chakka jams) were held on 31 January 2017 to gather momentum and mount pressure on the state government before the community's silent rally scheduled in Mumbai on 6 March 2017.

31 January 2017 – Mumbai and across Maharashtra

- Non-fatal injuries: at least 3 citizens
- Arrests: at least 27

=== July 2018 ===
On 23 July 2018, a Maratha Kranti Morcha activist committed suicide; the protesters refuse to collect the body and demanded the resignation of Devendra Fadnavis, the Chief Minister of Maharashtra. Kakasaheb Shinde-Patil, aged 28 committed suicide by jumping into the Godavari River during agitations at the village of Kaygaon Toka in the Gangapur taluka of Aurangabad District. The protesters blamed the district administration for not deploying boats and lifeguards despite being forewarned about the agitations.

On 24 July 2018, protests turned violent; protesters attacked police officers and torched buses, police vehicles, and private cars.

25 July 2018 – Mumbai, Navi Mumbai, Panvel, Thane, Kalyan, Palghar, Raigad

- Self-immolation: 5 protesters
- Non-fatal injuries:two police officers
- Property damage: 160 private cars in Navi Mumbai, 37 public transport buses in Mumbai, 2 fire brigade vehicles in Aurangabad, 16 vehicles torched, 80 vehicles vandalized in Chakan, Pune, 16 buses burned in Solapur

=== August 2018 ===
Maratha groups announced a shutdown across Maharashtra on August Kranti Day 2018 to intensify agitation for reservations. August Kranti Day is celebrated annually on 9 August. The Marathas launched a non-cooperation movement against the Government of Maharashtra and the Government of India. The non-cooperation movement covers non-payment of taxes to government and local bodies until reservations are implemented.

== Impacts ==
After continuously growing protests in each city and millions of people's participation in each Maratha Kranti Morcha, on 13 October 2016 the Government of Maharashtra took the decisions to: and

- Increase the upper limit of the Economically Backward Class (EBC) to Rs.6,00,000, and announced the extension of monetary benefits under this category to students from all castes. Students from the EBC category studying in all professional courses would be eligible for benefits such as fee reimbursement under the Rajshri Shahu Maharaj Scheme, which was named after the Maratha king Rajshri Shahu of Kolhapur, who introduced the first reservation policy in the kingdom of Kolhapur State.
- Create provisions for children of small landholding farmers under the Panjabrao Deshmukh Scheme, named after first State Agriculture Minister of India and Freedom fighter.

As the Bombay high court had stayed the 16% reservation granted to Maratha in government jobs and educational positions on the grounds that the data used by the government was faulty, the Government of Maharashtra on 5 December 2016 filed a 2,800-page affidavit to justify the reservations for Maratha as legal and show that it did not violate constitutional provisions. The affidavit contained documents substantiating the claim that the community is socially and educationally backward.

=== General Election 2024 ===
The threat to the BJP's hegemony is dire, as caste assertion threatens to break through the Hindutva patina.

The impact of the Maratha agitation was such that two MPs from Shinde's Shiv Sena – Hemant Patil and Hemant Godse – announced their resignation from the Lok Sabha in support of the protesters and their demand. BJP MPs openly extended his support to the Maratha community.

In General Election, the Maratha reservation issue damaged the prospects of the BJP-led Maha Yuti thus reducing the overall number of the BJP and the NDA.

=== Civic Elections Maharashtra 2025 ===
The Maratha reservation issue is once again flaring up in Maharashtra this time in the run up for the mega local bodies elections in the state.

== Dynamics of Conflict ==
=== Antagonistic to Maratha Kranti Morcha ===
- Chhagan Bhujbal opposes movement of Maratha Kranti Morcha for reservation demand of Maratha community under the Other Backward Class category despite his constitutional oath to uphold the sovereignty and integrity of India.

Chhagan Bhujbal suggested the Government of Maharashtra to carry out caste wise "Maharashtra Janganana" refers to the caste wise census of Maharashtra during 2027 census of India. The caste wise census will help to assess the actual outcomes of Reservation Schemes and to draft better targeted and equitable policies.

A 2024 report from the Maharashtra State Backward Class Commission (MSBCC) indicated that Maratha make up about 28% of the state's population. The exact percentage of the Kunbi caste in Maharashtra is not precisely reported, but they are often grouped with Maratha as part of the Maratha-Kunbi and Kunbi-Maratha cluster, which accounts for approximately 30% to 40% of the state's population. The Kunbi caste has Reservation in the Other Backward Class category. The exact population percentage for the Other Backward Class (OBC) in Maharashtra is disputed, with estimates ranging from 33.8% (based on 2011 census data) to over 38%, as suggested by recent analyses of educational and administrative datasets. A 2022 report by the Maharashtra State Backward Class Commission (MSBCC) analyzing data from the SARAL and UDISE reports indicated the Other Backward Class (OBC) population exceeding 38%.

- The Government of Maharashtra sets up the sub-committee for welfare of the Other Backward Class category amid protests and appointed Chandrashekhar Bawankule as the chairman of the sub-committee.

== Constitution of India: Part III Fundamental Rights ==
=== Article 15: Clause 5 ===
Nothing in this article or in sub-clause (g) of clause (1) of article 19 shall prevent the State from making any special provision, by law, for the advancement of any socially and educationally backward classes of citizens or for the Scheduled Castes or the Scheduled Tribes in so far as such special provisions relate to their admission to educational institutions including private educational institutions, whether aided or unaided by the State, other than the minority educational institutions referred to in clause (1) of article 30.]

== See also ==
- Maratha Aarakshan Chalwa
- Kunbi
- Maratha (caste)
- Marathi people
- Maratha clan system
- Misuse of Scheduled Caste and Scheduled Tribe (Prevention of Atrocities) Act, 1989
- Jat reservation agitation
- Reservation in India
- Reservation policy in Tamil Nadu
- Mandal Commission protests of 1990
- Socio Economic and Caste Census 2011
- Other Backward Class
- Court Cases Related to Reservation in India
- National Commission for Backward Classes
- National Commission on Farmers
- Fundamental Rights, Directive Principles and Fundamental Duties of India
- Constitution of India

== Integration of India ==
- Marathwada
- Satara State
- Kolhapur State
- Gwalior State
- Baroda State
- Gwalior State
- Indore State
- Maratha Empire
- List of Maratha dynasties and states
- List of princely states of British India (by region)
- Political integration of India
