= Mahadik =

Mahadik is a surname mainly found in Maharashtra and surrounding states of India.

Notable people with the surname Mahadik include:

- Wamanrao Mahadik, Indian politician belonging to the Shiv Sena party
- Dhananjay Mahadik, Indian politician belonging to the Bharatiya Janta Party
- Sunil Mahadik, Indian art director

== See also ==
- Maratha clan system
