= Devane (clan) =

Marathi Surname

Devane (or Devne/Deone/Davane/Davne) (Marathi: देवणे/ दवणे) is a Maratha Toponymic clan surname native to the Indian states of Maharashtra and Karnataka, meaning divine or god/deity-like.

== Etymology ==
Marathi surnames usually end with the suffix 'kar' or 'e', indicating the place of origin. or represents family traditions and professions of ancestors. So they must have originally belonged to Deoni village in Udgir, Maharashtra. Some historians consider Devanagere as the origin city.

== Status ==
They are prominent in the Marathwada and Kolhapur regions of Maharashtra Most of them belong to (Maratha) caste, and trace themselves to Yadav Chandravanshiya dynasty. Some also belong to Vani community. They usually follow Vaishnavism and Veerashaivism with many of them worshipping Lord Veerabhadra as Gotrapurusha.

== Notable people ==
- Datta Raghoba Devane - Indian Freedom Fighter.
- Vijay Devane - Indian Politician.
- Pravin Davane - Marathi Author
- Sushant Davane - Indian Actor.
- Ashwini Devane - Indian Scientist.
- Ramesh Davane- Founder, Bangalore Industrial Technical Consultancy Services Private Limited (BITCON).
- Karan Shamrao Devane - American Professor at Wake Forest University School of Medicine, North Carolina, USA.
- Mahendra Davane - Deputy Director, Directorate of Technical Education, Maharashtra State.
- Nemaji Shriram Devane - Revenue Officer, Govt. of Maharashtra.
- Dr. Gulab V. Devane (1921–1995) - Distinguished Professor and Honorary Director of Kane Research Institute of the Asiatic Society of Bombay.

== See also ==
- Maratha clan system
