= Manoj Jarange =

Indian activist (born 1982)

- Born: Manoj Raosaheb Jarange; 1 August 1982 (age 44); Matori, Beed district, Maharashtra, India
- Occupation: Social activist
- Years active: 2012–present
- Spouse: Sumitra Patil
- Children: One son and 3 daughter

Manoj Raosaheb Jarange (born 1 August 1982), also known as Manoj Jarange Patil, is an Indian activist fighting for the Marathas to be recognized as an OBC group. He is based in the state of Maharashtra, India.

== Early life ==
Jarange, born in Maratha (caste), is originally from the Matori village of Shirur Kasar (previously in Gevrai TQ.) tehsil in Beed district, settled in Shahagad. Jarange Patil and his wife Sumitra are parents to 3 daughters and a son. He is the youngest of four brothers and lives with his mother and father. He joined the Maratha reservation movement 15 years ago. Later, he founded the Shivba Sanghatana (English translation: Shivaji organisation) to organize protests.

== Activism ==
Jarange gained attention during a hunger strike in September 2023 at Antarwali-Sarathi village.

He led a protest march, part of the Maratha Kranti Morcha and Sakal Maratha Samaj, from his hometown in Jalna, originally intended for Azad Maidan in Mumbai starting 26 January 2024. The aim was to advocate for expanding Kunbi Other Backward Class certification to Marathas, enabling them to access OBC benefits, including a 27 percent reservation in government jobs and education in the state. In continuation of the protest, Jarange-Patil began fasting in Vashi, Navi Mumbai. But it ended on 27 January 2024, when Chief Minister of Maharashtra Eknath Shinde assured that the Maratha community would receive OBC benefits until securing a reservation.

On 29 August 2025, he led another protest march across Mumbai. Multiple road closures brought traffic to a standstill, leaving residents to bear the brunt of the chaos. He ended his protest on 2 September 2025 when the Government of Maharashtra finally agreed to his demand.

== In popular culture ==
- Sangharsh Yoddha Manoj Jarange Patil, a 2024 Marathi-language film directed by Shivaji Doltade.
- Aamhi Jarange, a 2024 Marathi-language film starred Makarand Deshpande in the leading role.
