= Oval Maidan =

Recreational activity ground in Mumbai

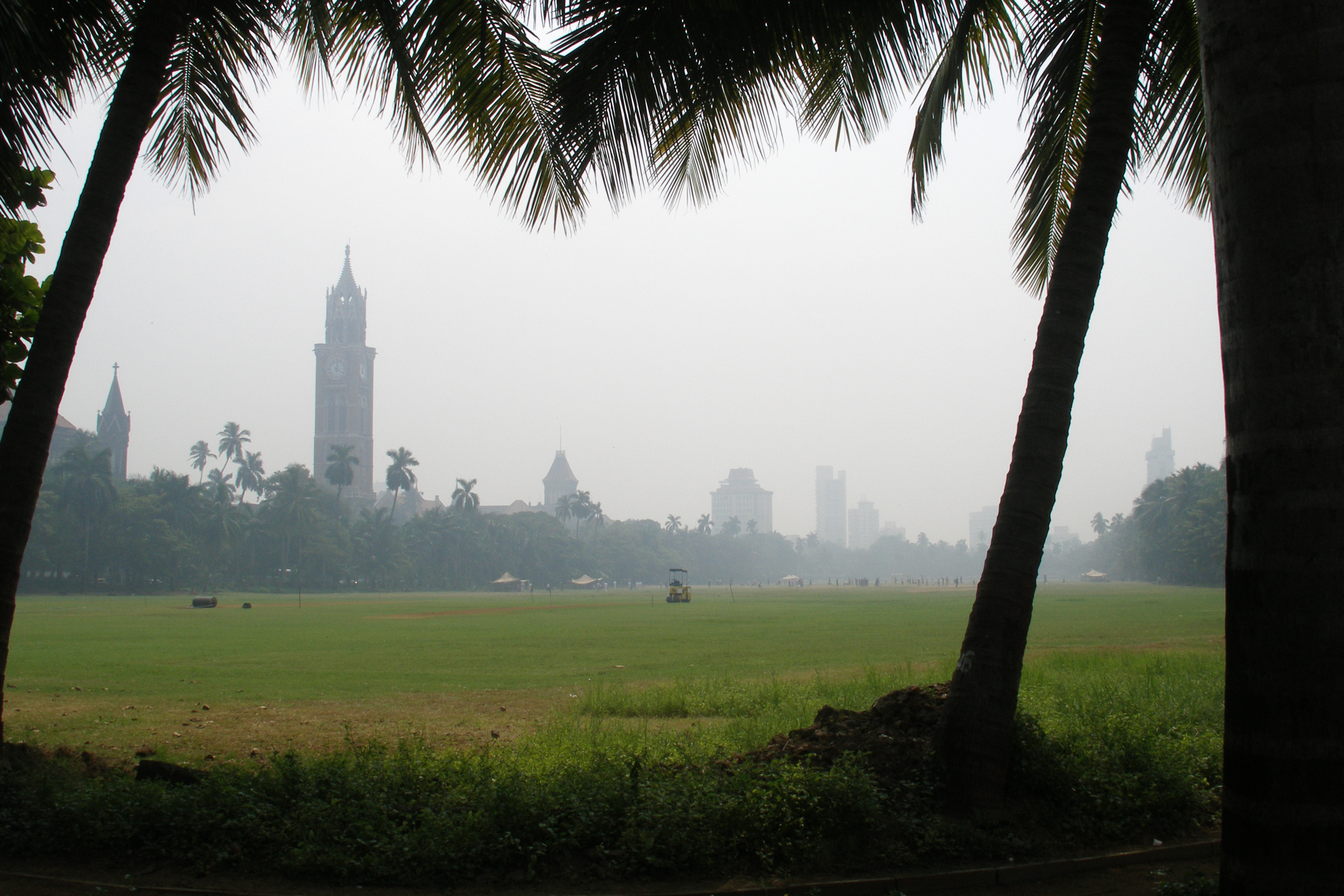
Panoramic view of Oval Maidan

Oval Maidan is a large Grade I recreational ground situated in South Mumbai, India. It is so named because of its oval shape and is situated just south of Churchgate. It is a popular recreation ground, with the most popular sports played there being cricket and football. The ground measures 22 acres (8.9 ha) in area. Political rallies and religious functions are banned in the maidan.

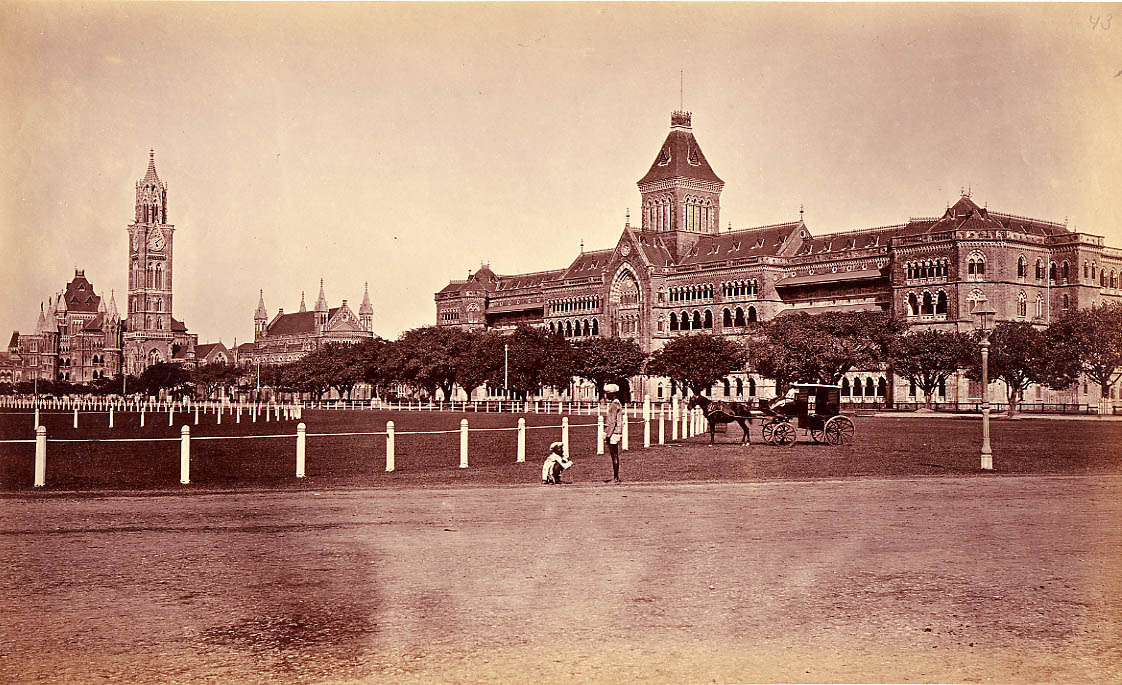
Oval Maidan in 1875

== History ==
Until the early 20th century the vast expanses of the Oval Maidan, Azad Maidan, Cooperage Ground and Cross Maidan formed the area known as Esplanade.

Until the late 20th century the ground was owned and run by the state government and was very poorly maintained. It was frequented by beggars, prostitutes and drug peddlers. Finally, in 1997 the Oval-Cooperage Residents Association (OCRA) was formed as a public charitable trust set up by the residents of the area. OCRA petitioned the Maharashtra government to maintain the Oval maidan. The Maharashtra government did not respond to the petition, leading the group to take it to the Bombay High Court. The Court ruled in their favour, forcing the government to either maintain the maidan or hand it over to OCRA which it subsequently did.

The OCRA then went about fencing the ground and building a jogging course around the periphery. A lane which cut through the diameter of the ground was metalled to facilitate a smoother thoroughfare.

For a few years the former Indian cricketer Dilip Vengsarkar operated the Elf cricket academy to the north of the ground.

== Gallery ==
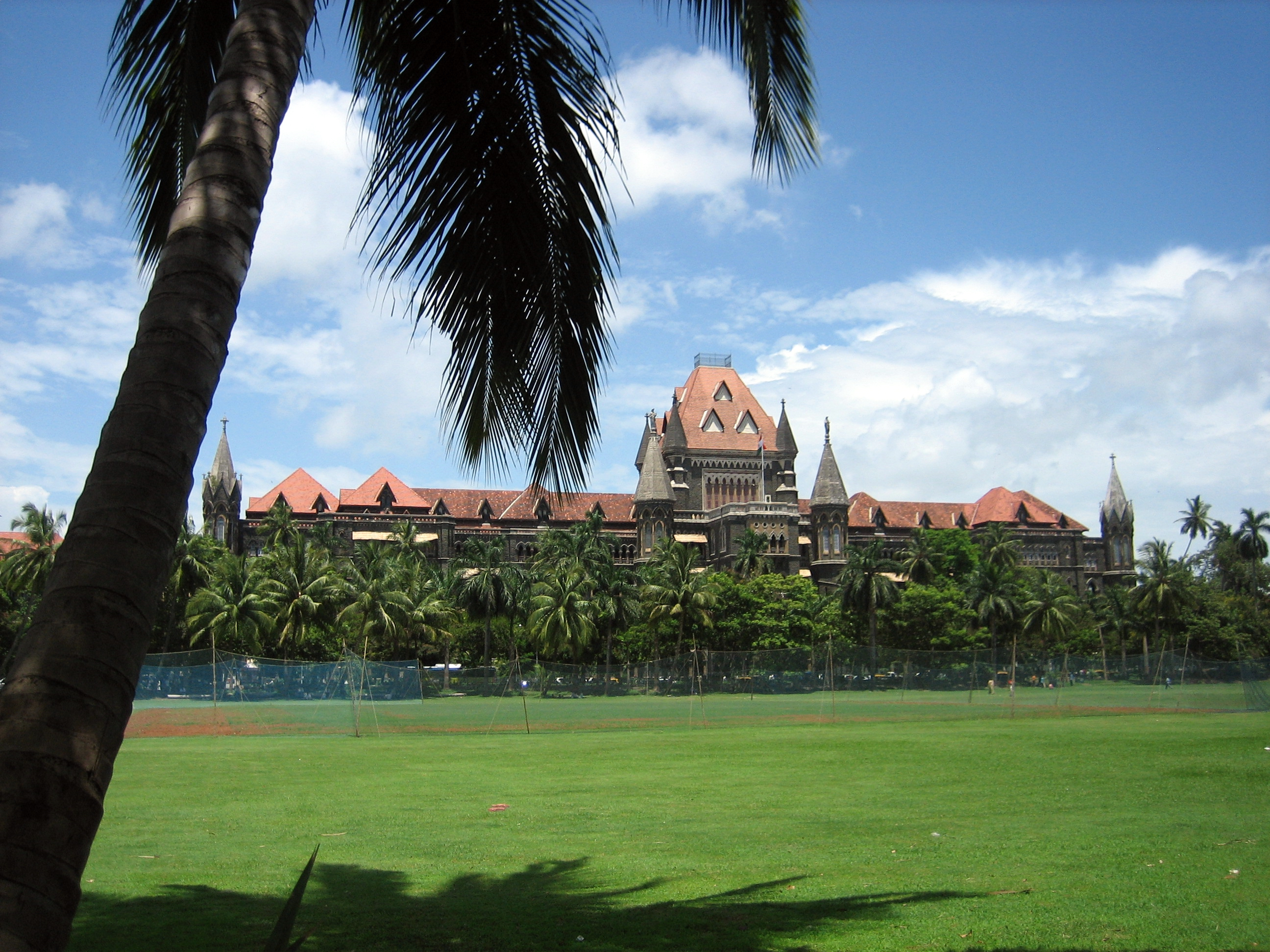
Oval Maidan with the Bombay High Court in the background

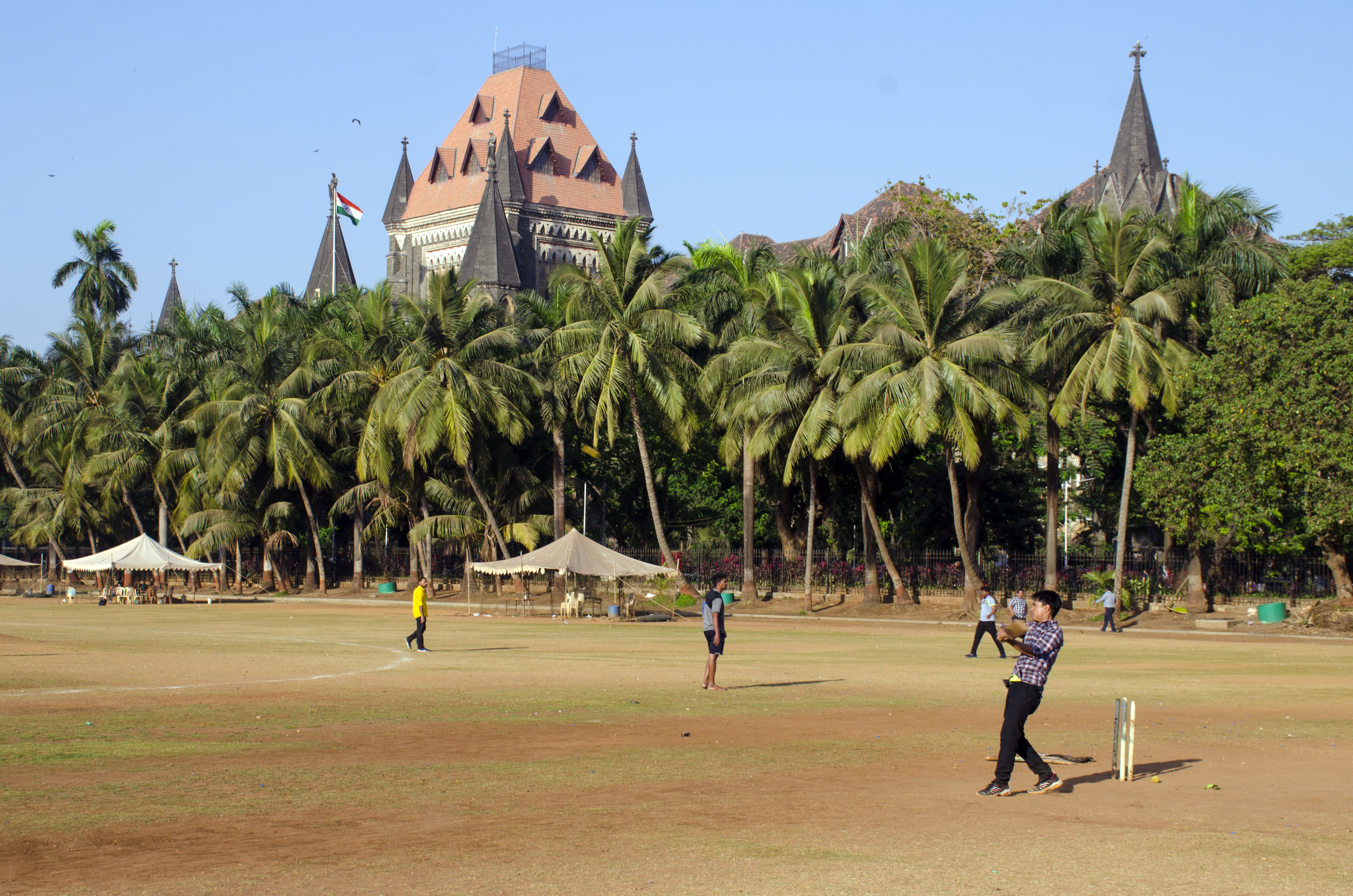
Oval Maidan with the Bombay High Court building

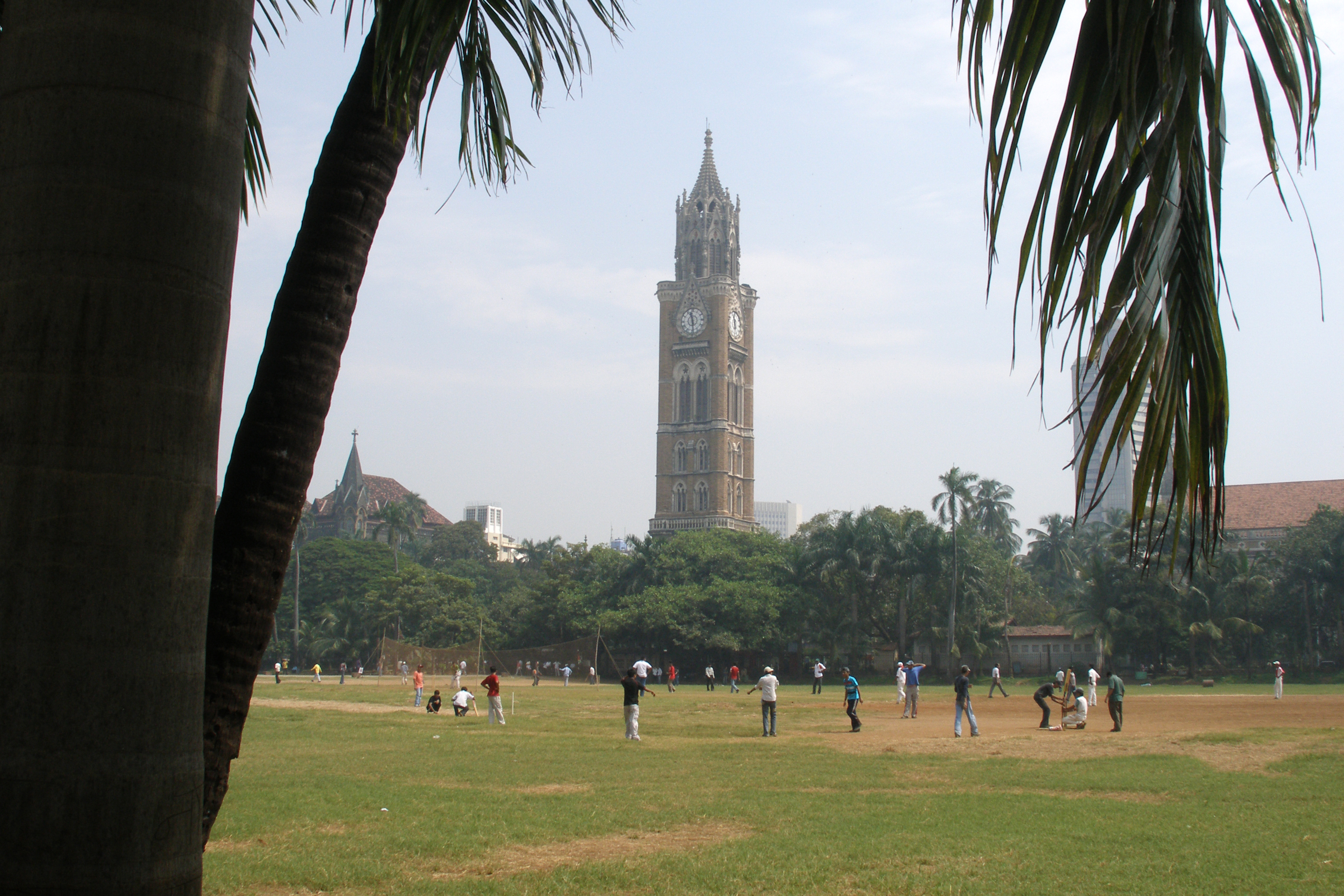
Rajabai Clock Tower

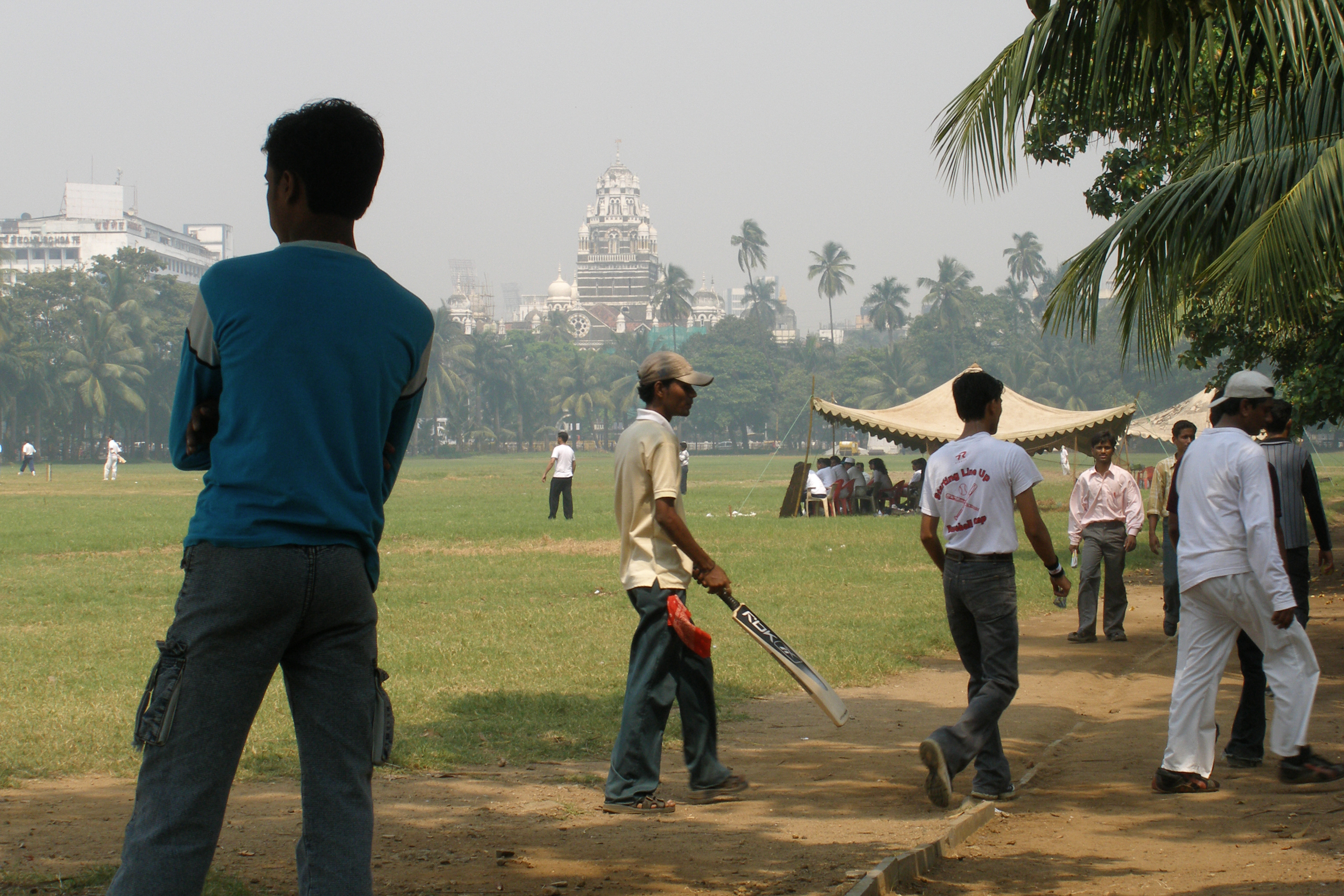
Cricket games

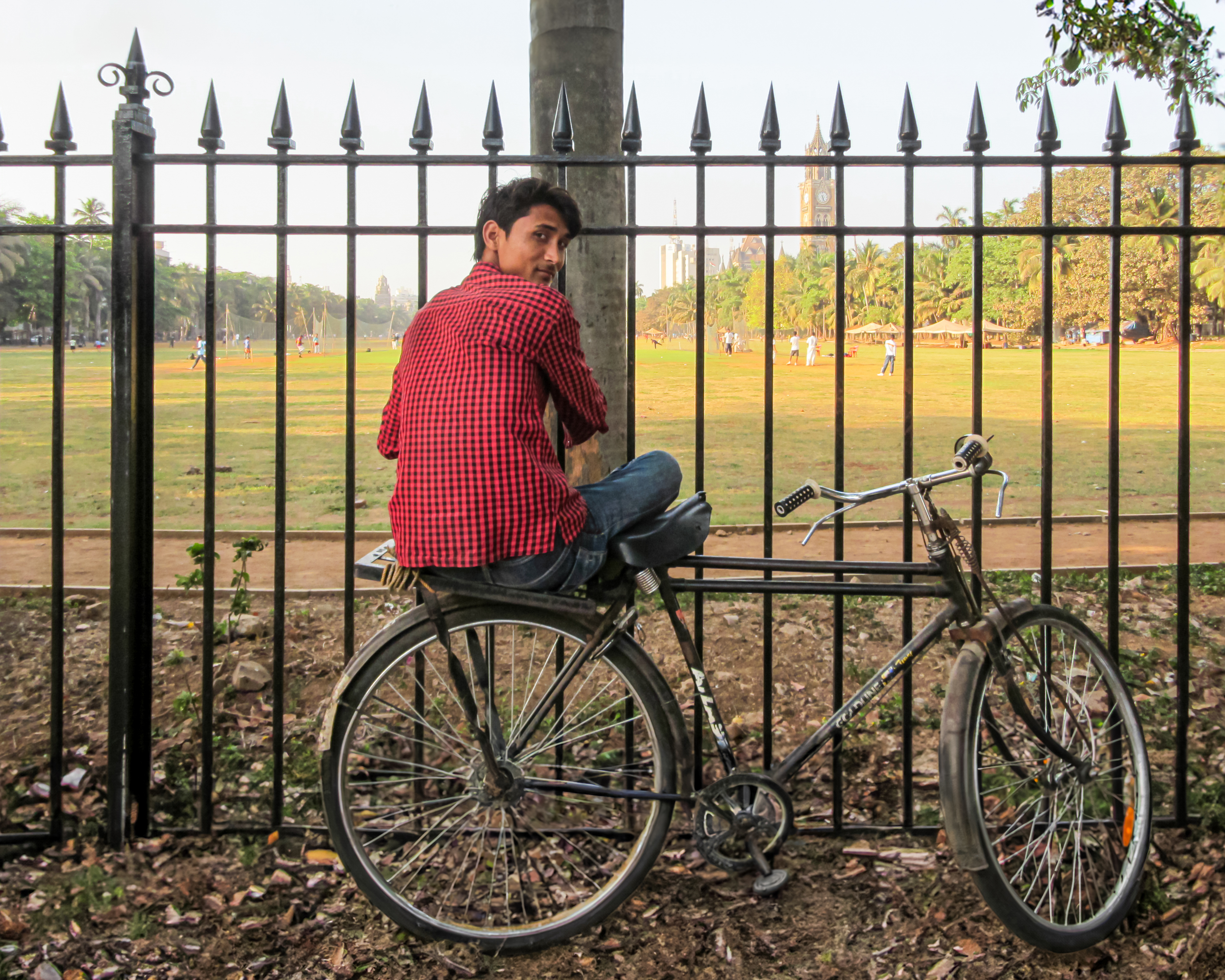
Fence around Oval Maidan

== See also ==
- Cross Maidan
- Azad Maidan
