= Cross Maidan =

Open ground in Mumbai

Coordinates: 18.936297°N 72.829742°E

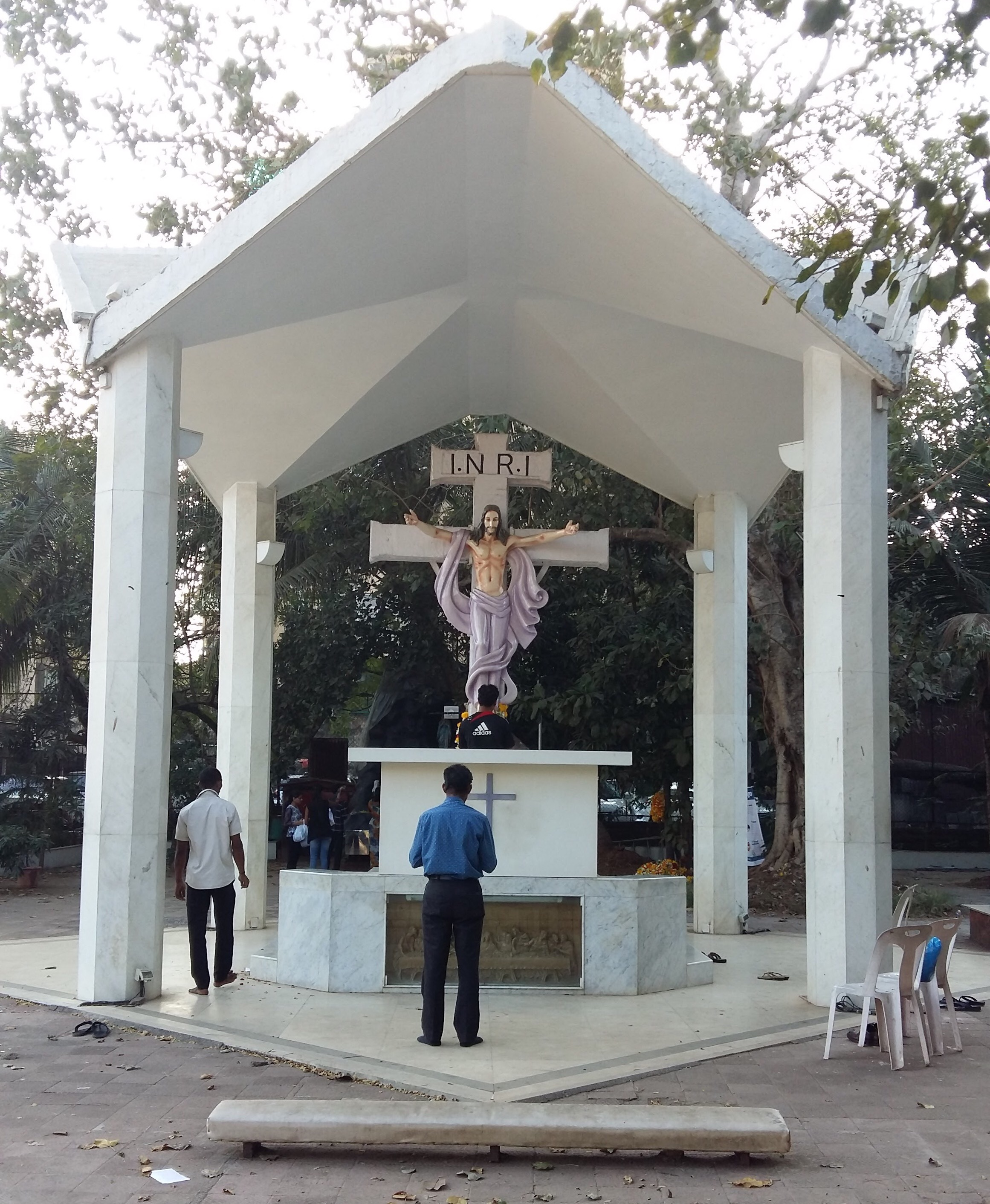
Crucifix at Cross Maidan

Cross Maidan (formerly Parade Ground ) is a vast expanse of land in Mumbai. The term maidan means "playing ground" in Marathi. The ground measures 23,000 m^{2}. The name "Cross" is derived for the old stone Cross (crucifix) built when the city was under Portuguese rule in the 16th century. The maidan is under the jurisdiction of the district collector. In 2009 it was announced that a 30-foot tall steel sculpture inspired by Mahatma Gandhi's charkha would be installed at the maidan. In the same year, the government also announced that it would be laying a water tunnel from the Malabar Hill reservoir to Cross Maidan at the cost of Rs. 940 million. It is claimed that the South Mumbai locality will have adequate water supply once this water tunnel is completed.

== The Maidan ==
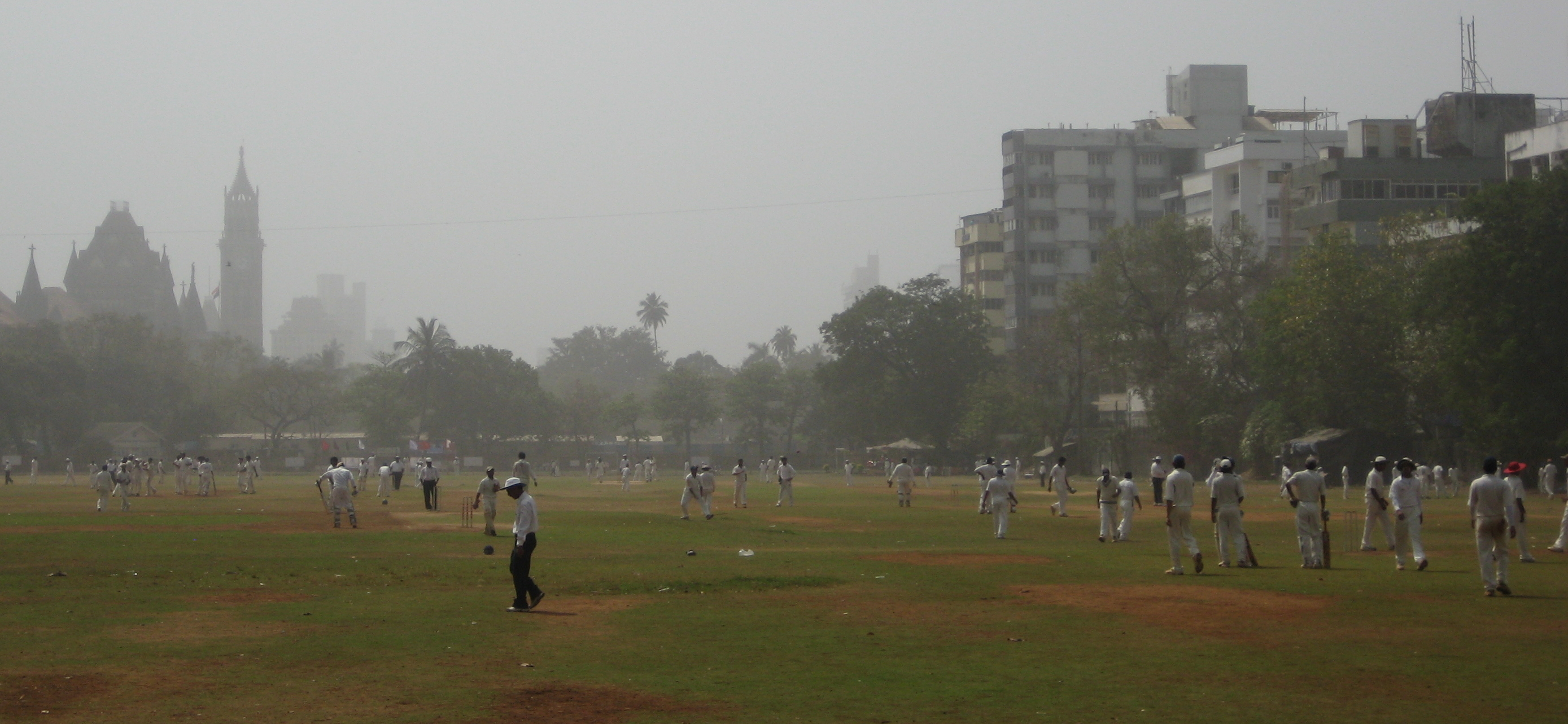
Cricket Pitches at Cross Maidan

The vast expanses of land of the Oval Maidan, Azad Maidan, Cooperage Ground and Cross Maidan until the early 20th century formed the area known as Esplanade. The road which divides Cross Maidan and Azad Maidan which is today called Mahatma Gandhi Road was formerly known as the Esplanade. The term Esplanade is almost obliterated from history books except for the Bombay High Court which still goes by the term esplanade court. The part of MG Road abutting the Cross Maidan is popularly known as Fashion Street, with a range of vogue clothing at throwaway prices.

The rest of the ground is used for cricket in the dry season and football (soccer) during the monsoons. Near the southern end, the Mahindra United Club, a national level club, has undertaken a lease of a small portion of the ground. In the past, traveling circuses have used the ground. The ground hosts eight cricket pitches. In 1986, Reliance Industries Limited held their AGM at the ground with 30,000 company shareholders in attendance. During the pre-independence era, the ground used to hold rallies and parades.

Cutting across the centre of the ground is a shortcut that links the two railway stations of Chhatrapati Shivaji Maharaj Terminus and Churchgate. The lane known as "Khau Galli" meaning Food Lane in Marathi, is traversed by thousands of people rushing to their work places. At times exhibitions and fairs are held in the maidan.

Due to encroachment by Fashion Street hawkers and also mounds of garbage dumped in the southern end of the maidan, it has deteriorated to such an extent that a special committee has been set up to look after the ground, fence it off and clear the garbage and attain a heritage status.

== The Cross ==
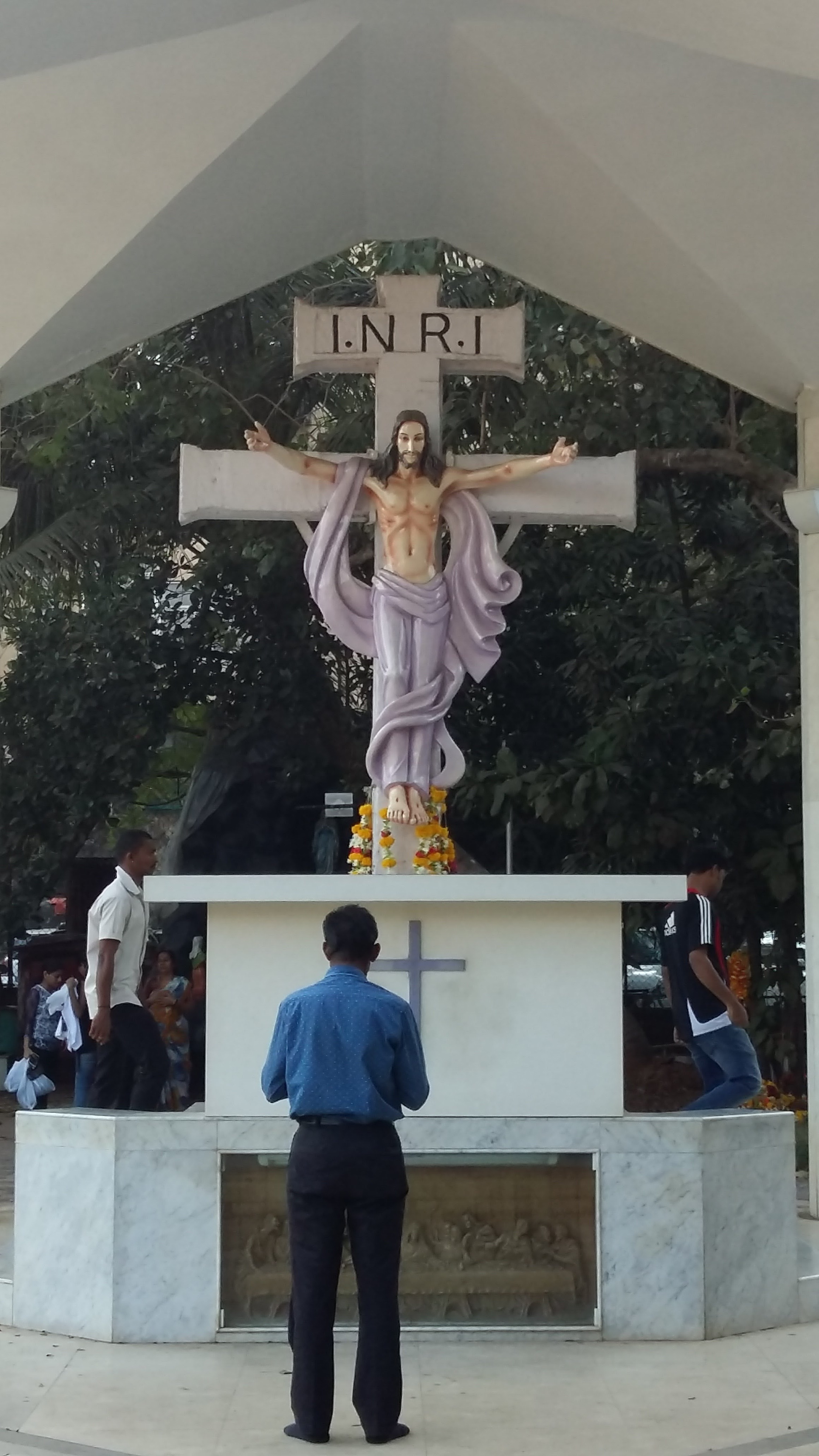
Crucifix

The cross used to stand where the current Elphinstone School currently stands. Currently it stands at the northern end of the ground. The cross is attested to have miraculous powers and devotees come from all over Mumbai and Goa during the feast on 3 May. The cross is adulated by both Christians and non-Christians. Good Friday and Maundy Thursday services are held in an exclusive area around the cross. The cross is maintained by the local diocese.

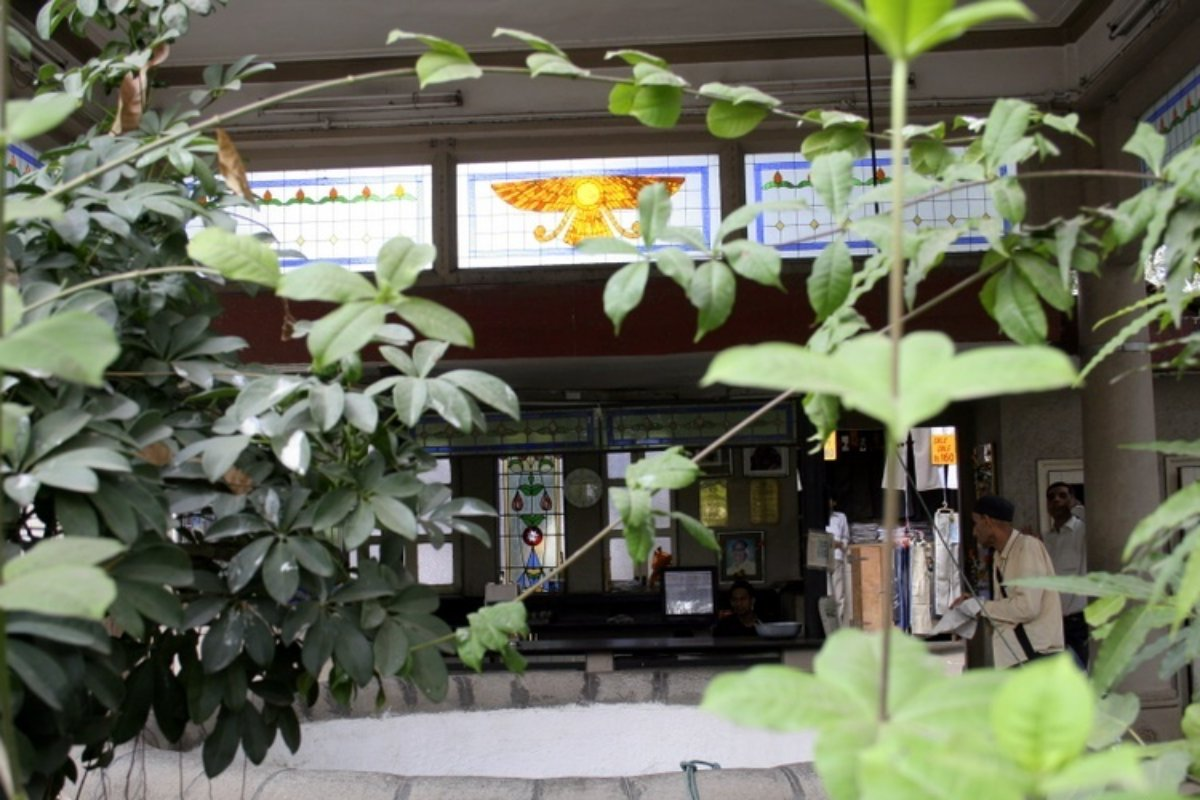
Bhikha Behram Well

== Bhika Behram Well ==
At the southern end of the maidan stands a well built by Bhika Behram in 1725. Behram, a Parsi, was travelling through this region, when he built this well for travellers. The well has a perennial source of sweet water, which is remarkable as most of the water in the area is brackish owing to the proximity to the Arabian Sea. The site is a declared heritage structure and is held sacred by the Parsi community.
