= List of Maratha people =

This article lists people belonging to the Maratha (caste).

== Rulers and Chiefs ==
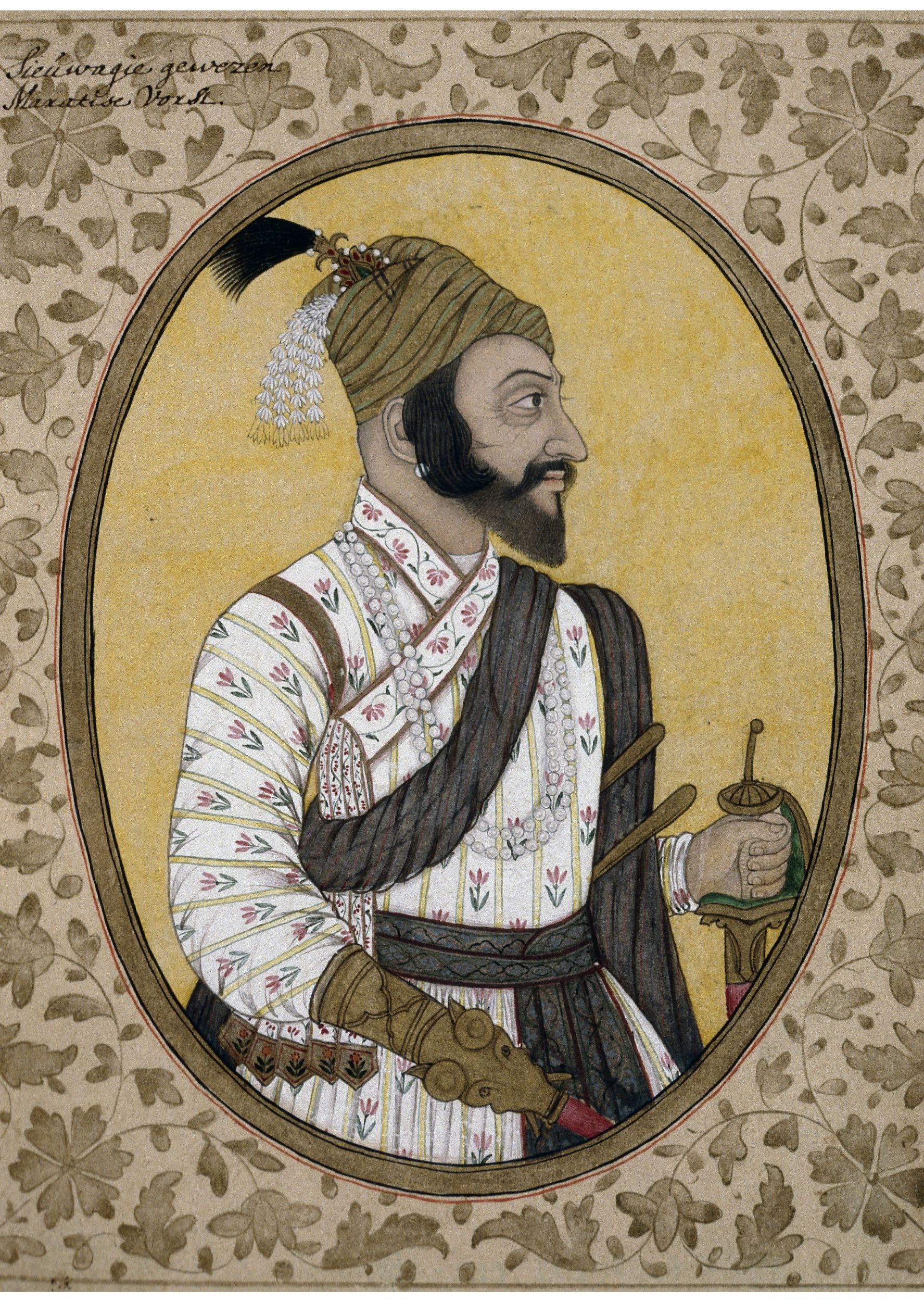
Shivaji, the Maratha jagirdar and founder of the Maratha kingdom.

- Shivaji, (1627/1630–1680), founder and first ruler of the Marathas.
- Venkoji, Founder of the Thanjavur Kingdom, half-brother of Shivaji.
- Sambhaji, (1657–1689), son of Shivaji; second ruler of Marathas.
- Tarabai (née Mohite) (1675–1761), led Maratha resistance against the Mughals after the death of her husband, Rajaram I.Set up the Kolhapur house of Bhonsle and acted as regent for her young son, Shivaji II from 1700 to 1712.
- Shahu I(1682-1749), was in prison until 1707 . Released after aurangzeb's death, he fought and defeated his aunt tarabai and became the fifth ruler of the Marathas. He accepted suzerainty of the Mughal empire.
- Shahu of Kolhapur (1874 – 1922), GCSI GCIE GCVO, ruler of the princely state of Kolhapur and a social reformer.
- Maloji Bhosale (1552–1606, 1620 or 1622), Jagirdar and General under the Ahmadnagar Sultanate, first Bhosale to receive the title of 'Raje.
- Shahaji (1594–1664), father of Shivaji. Jagirdar and General under the Ahmadnagar Sultanate and Adilshahi.
- Jijabai, (1598–1674), wife of Shahaji Raje Bhosale and mother of Shivaji.
- Hambirrao Mohite (1640–1687), Commander-in-chief, also known as Sarnobat, who took the side of Sambhaji even though he was the brother of Soyarabai and fought against the Mughals.
- Santaji Ghorpade (1660–1696), one of the most trusted generals of Rajaram.
- Dhanaji Jadhav (1650[1]–1708), Commander-in-chief of Maratha forces under Rajaram and Tarabai, who led the fight against the Mughal Empire.
- Khanderao Dabhade ( –1729), Commander-in-chief who led the Marathas into Gujarat.
- Mahadaji Shinde (1730–1792), Maratha ruler of the state of Gwalior in central India. He was the fifth and youngest son of Sardar Ranoji Scindia.

== Indian armed forces ==
- Major Rama Raghoba Rane, awarded the Param Vir Chakra

== Modern politics ==
- Sharad Pawar (12 December 1940 –) - former Minister of Agriculture and Minister of Consumer Affairs in the Indian Central Government, formerly Defence Minister of India and thrice Chief Minister of Maharashtra; Food and Public Distribution, India and former BCCI President and ICC President.
- Madhavrao Scindia (10 March 1945 – 30 September 2001)- Former Congress leader, Minister of Human Resource Development, Minister of Tourism and Minister of Civil Aviation
- Yashwantrao Balwantrao Chavan (12 March 1913 – 25 November 1984) - 1st Chief Minister of Maharashtra, 5th Deputy Prime Minister of India, Minister of Home Affairs, Minister of External Affairs, Minister of Defence and Minister of Finance
- Vasantdada Patil (13 November 1917 – 1 March 1989) - 6th Chief Minister of Maharashtra
- Shankarrao Chavan (14 July 1920 – 26 February 2004) - 5th Chief Minister of Maharashtra and 16th Minister of Home Affairs. 11th Minister of Defence,17th Minister of Finance and 13th Minister of Education in Union cabinet.He is the father of 16th Chief Minister of Maharashtra Politician Ashok Chavan
- Vinod Tawde - Former Minister of secondary education in Maharashtra government and National general secretary and rashtriya Mahamantri of BJP
- Patangrao Kadam (8 January 1944 – 9 March 2018) - a prominent Indian politician of Indian National Congress, Forest minister of Maharashtra government; founder of Bharti Vidyapeeth, a deemed university
- Vilasrao Deshmukh (26 May 1945 – 14 August 2012) - former Chief Minister of Maharashtra
- Pratapsingh Rane - former Chief Minister of Goa
- Balasaheb Vikhe Patil (10 April 1932 – 30 December 2016) - former member of the Indian Parliament and member of Indian National Congress
- Ranjitsinh Pratapsinh Gaekwad (8 May 1938 – 10 May 2012) - was an Indian politician and the Maharaja of Baroda
- B. J. Khatal-Patil (26 March 1919 – 16 September 2019) - former Maharashtra Cabinet Minister, Politician and Independence Activist
- Jyotiraditya Scindia is currently Serving as Minister of Information and Broadcasting
- Dr. Shivajirao Patil Nilangekar(9 february 1931 - 5 August 2020) - 10th Chief Minister Of Maharashtra
- Prithviraj Chavan - 17th Chief Minister of Maharashtra and Former Mos for PMO office, he is the son of veteran Politician and Union Minister Dajisaheb Chavan

== See also ==
- List of Marathi Buddhists
- List of Marathi Brahmins
