= Devak =

Hindu totem

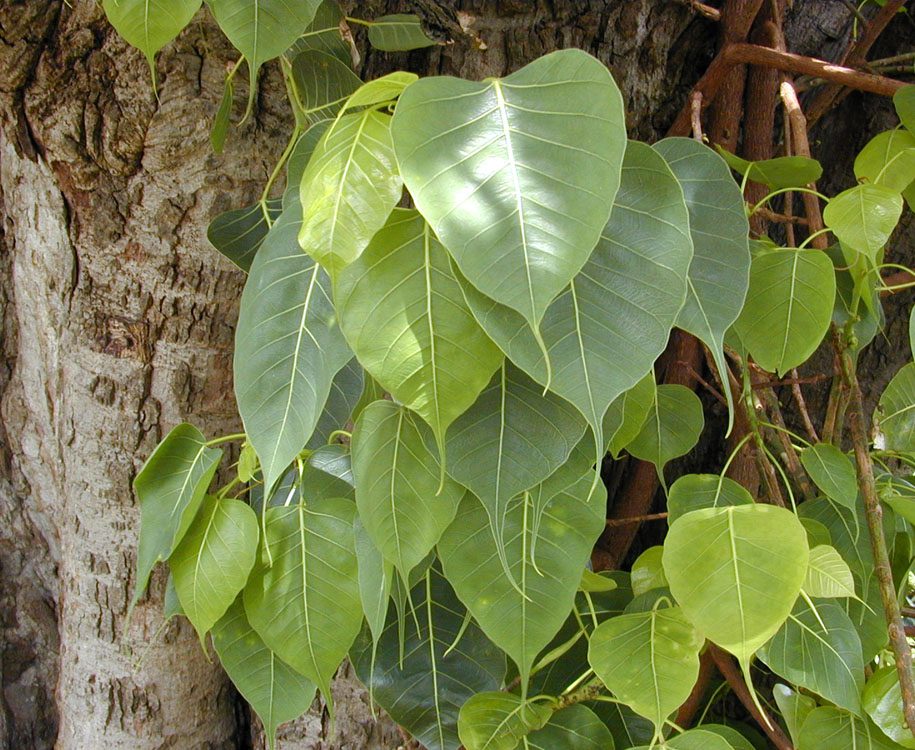
Leaves of Pipal tree, Devak for many Maratha clans

A devak, in Maratha people of Maharashtra, India culture, is a family guardian or totem in the form of a physical object, such as a tree. Some sources define devak as being distinct from the more generic word totem. The word Devak implies god. The devak plays an important role in Maratha marriages, as traditionally a man may not marry a woman whose paternal-lineage totem is the same as his own.

== See also ==
- Pole worship
