= Azad Maidan =

Sports ground in Mumbai, India

Coordinates: 18°56′25″N 72°49′54″E

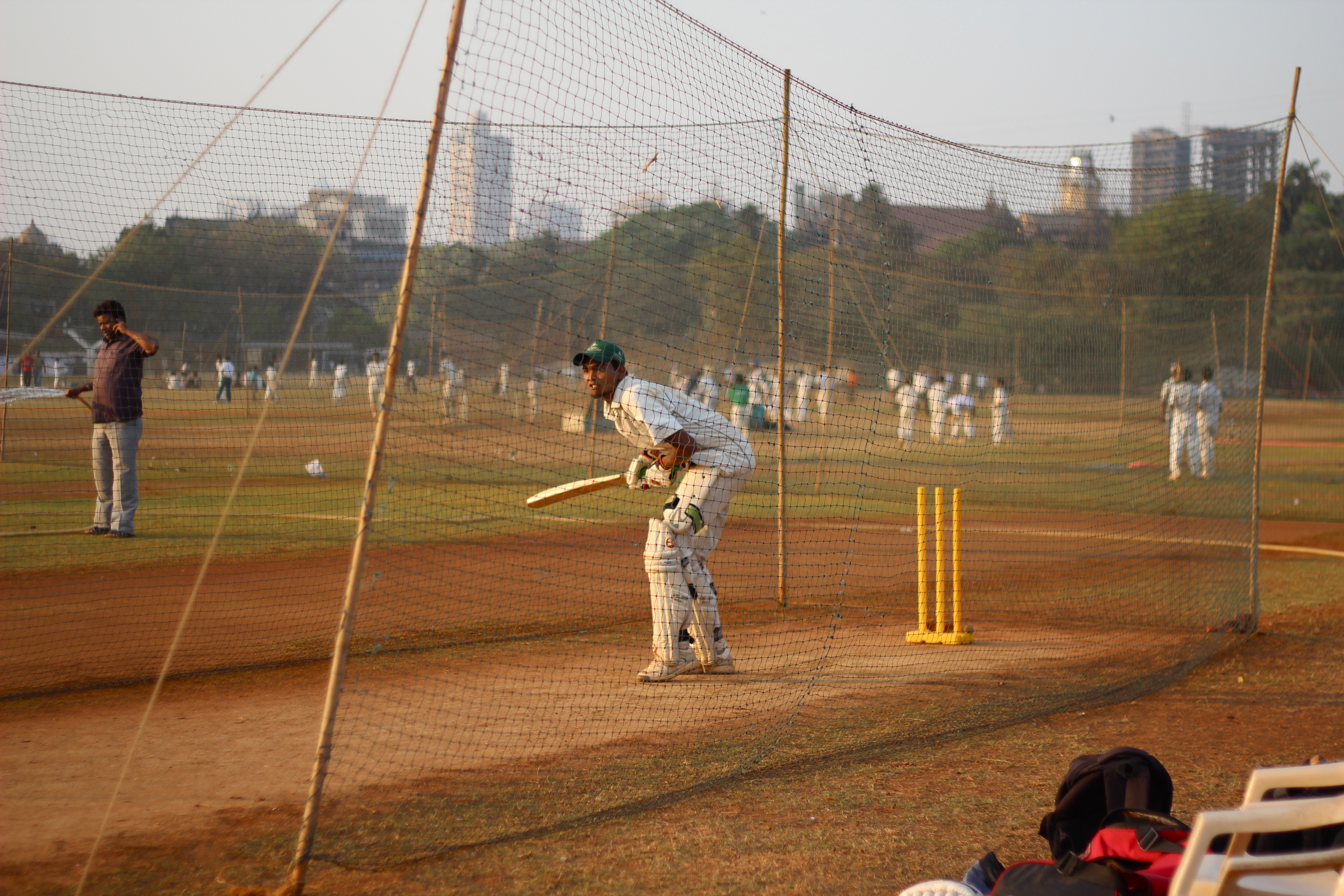
Net practice in session at Azad Maidan

Azad Maidan (formerly known as Bombay Gymkhana Maidan) is a triangular-shaped maidan (sports ground) in the city of Mumbai, India. It is located on 25 acres (10 ha) of land near the Chhatrapati Shivaji Terminus station. It is a regular venue for inter-school cricket matches. The name Azad means "liberty" in Persian. The ground is known for its cricket pitches, for protest meetings, and for political rallies. The Bombay Gymkhana clubhouse was built in 1875, at the southern end of the maidan. Every year, Sunni Annual Ijtema is held at Azad Maidan.

== History ==
The vast expanses of land of the Oval Maidan, Azad Maidan, Cooperage Ground and Cross Maidan until the early 20th century formed the area known as Esplanade.

Mahatma Gandhi addressed the largest ever political meeting at Azad Maidan in December 1931.

== Cricket ==
The ground hosts twenty-two cricket pitches. The cricket pitches at the ground have produced many international cricketers. On 20 November 2013, Prithvi Shaw created history with 546 runs and in 1987 Sachin Tendulkar and Vinod Kambli shared a huge 664 run record partnership during a Harris Shield school match at Azad Maidan. In 2009, Sarfaraz Khan scored 439 runs in a Harris Shield match at Azad Maidan. Azad Maidan plays host to a number of cricket matches throughout the year, including Inter-School and Club matches.

== Other notable events ==
=== CM swearing-in ceremony ===
Mumbai's Azad Maidan, a historic ground known for hosting major political and public events, will witness yet another significant moment 05-12-2024 at 5:30 PM. The iconic venue, synonymous with freedom struggles and mass gatherings, continues to be a symbol of democratic traditions as it prepares to host the swearing-in ceremony amidst grand arrangements and tight security.

=== Hunger strike ===
Manoj Jarange-Patil, a Maratha Kranti Morcha activist, demanded reservation for Marathas under the Other Backward Class (OBC) category. Manoj Jarange-Patil started a Hunger strike on 29 August 2025 10:00AM at Azad Maidan in the city of Mumbai to exert pressure on the Chief Minister of Maharashtra Devendra Fadnavis.

On 2 September 2025; 5th day of hunger strike; the Government of Maharashtra accepted the demands of reservation for Maratha_(caste) community under the Other Backward Class category by issuing Kunbi caste certificates to Maratha_(caste) community. Renounced Manoj Jarange-Patil ended his hunger strike on 5th day.

== See also ==
- Azad Maidan riots
- Cross Maidan
- Oval Maidan
