= Sunil Mahadik =

Sunil Mahadik, an alumnus of Sir J.J. Institute of Applied Art, began his career in advertising as a visualiser with Trikaya. In 1989, he co-founded an advertisement agency called Nexus-Equity. In 1992, he started FX Studios, a design studio which became Flagship Advertising Pvt Ltd in 1995. He also leads the creative team at XOX Design. He is an active member of the Managing Committee of Communication Arts Guild (CAG).

== Awards ==
He was awarded the title of the Art Director of the Year by CAG in 1992 and A&M in 1996 and 1997. Their campaign for Mother’s Recipe pickles was awarded the Best Ad Campaign of the year. He was selected as one of the finalists at the International Advertising Awards in New York, and has been featured in various reputed publications including Luizer’s International Archive.
