= Kopardi gang rape and murder =

Caste based sexual violence against a child in Maharashtra, India

A 15 year old girl from the Maratha (caste) was gang raped and murdered by three Dalit men in the village of Kopardi, in Ahmednagar district of Maharashtra. The victim's teeth and limb were broken and had bite marks all over her body.

Millions of Marathas protested in Western Maharastrian towns. Protests continued for six weeks against the rape murder. The three accused were convicted of the gang rape and murder.
