= Fashion Street =

Shopping district in Mumbai, India

Coordinates: 18.937982°N 72.830300°E

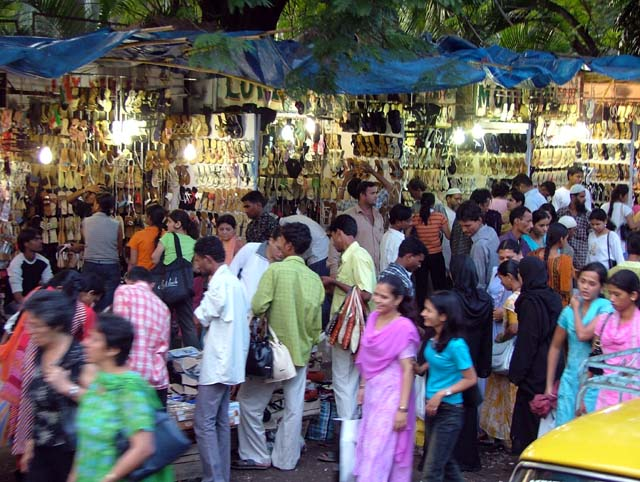

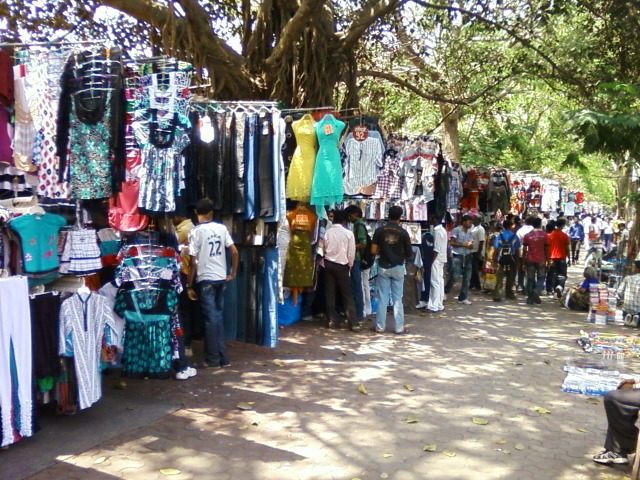

Fashion Street refers to a cluster of over 385 street side clothing shops on MG Road, near Azad Maidan, and is opposite to Bombay Gymkhana, in South Mumbai, India.

The market is located just opposite the VSNL office building at Mahatma Gandhi Road (MG Road). It is a popular tourist destination and is known for bargaining.

In January 2011, as a part of the green drive of BMC along with Fashion Street Shopowners' Association, the market at Fashion Street stopped using plastic bags and switched to paper bags. Now they are again using plastic bags made by the training workshop of the National Association of the Blind.
