= Mathadi =

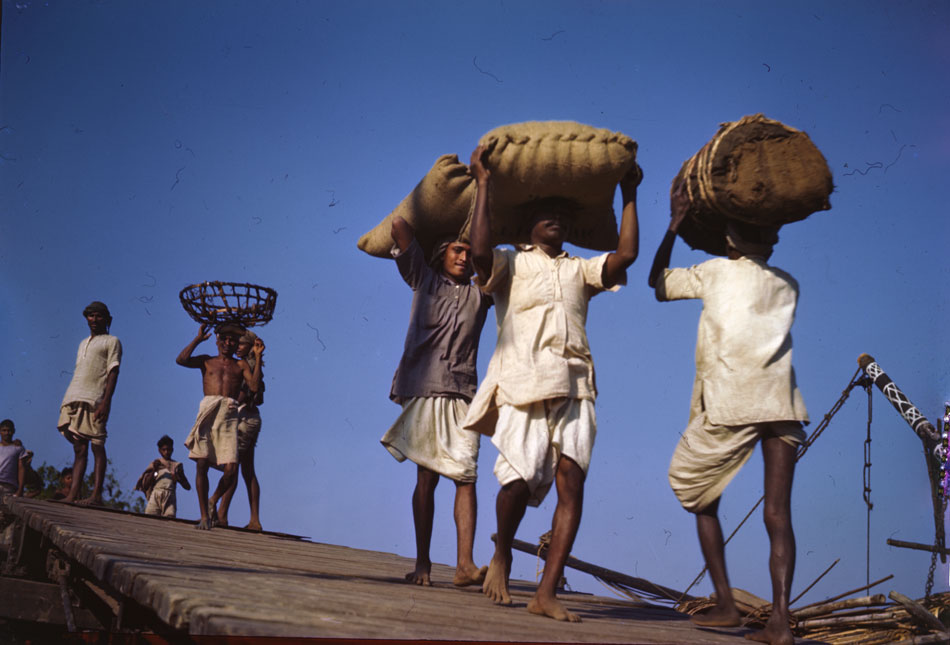
Mathadis

Mathadi is a Marathi language term to denote a head-loader. In Maharashtra, India, the mathadis are organised under a welfare board, set up in compliance to the Maharashtra Hamal, Mathadi and other unprotected workers (Regulation of Employment and Welfare) Act 1969. There are 36 Mathadi boards in Maharashtra.

According to the Act, "Mathadi means a person carrying a load of material either on his head (Matha) or on his back to stack at the appropriate place. These operations include loading unloading stacking, carrying, weighing, measuring or such other works including work preparatory or incidental to such operations."
