= Maratha clan system =

Clan system within Marathas of India

The Maratha clan system (also referred to as Shahannava Kuli Marathas, 96 Kuli Marathas) refers to the 96 Maratha clans. The clans together form the Maratha caste of India. These Marathas primarily reside in the Indian state of Maharashtra, with smaller regional populations in other states.

== Origin ==
The 96 clans that the Maratha caste is divided into were originally formed in the earlier centuries from the amalgamation of families from the (Kunbi), shepherd (Dhangar), pastoral (Gavli), blacksmith (Lohar), carpenter (Sutar), Bhandari and Thakar castes in Maharashtra. The 96 kul(clans) and genealogies were fabricated after they gained political prominence. These clans were flexible enough that most of the Kunbi population got absorbed into these clans even in the 20th century.

Thus, due to the mainly peasant origin, the claim of the 96 clans to the Kshatriya ritual status in the Hindu Varna hierarchy is considered spurious. Jaffrelot calls such claims "Kshatriyatisation", which he considers similar to Sanskritisation.

== Military history ==
Many Maratha clans served as Patils or Deshmukhs for the Bahmani sultanate, and its successors, the Deccan sultanates and the Mughals from 14th century onwards under the watandari system. Influential families from this era include, Sawant of Sawantwadi, Ghorpade of Mudhol, Nimbalkar of Phaltan, Mane, Shirke, Mahadik and Mohite. Shivaji's own Bhosale family came to prominence later than these families. In his quest for swarajya, he had to fight, or subdue these families using a variety of strategies. One of them included killing of Chandrarao More, a fellow Maratha feudatory of Bijapur, and seizing the valley of Javali, near the present-day hill station of Mahabaleshwar. The conquest of Javali allowed Shivaji to extend his raids into south and southwest Maharashtra. Other strategies included forming marital alliances, dealing directly with village Patils to bypass the Deshmukhs, or subduing them by force.

== Kinship, deities and totems ==
In Maratha society, membership of a Kul or clan is acquired in a patrilineal manner. People belonging to a clan usually have a common surname, a common clan deity, and a common clan totem (Devak). Various lists have been compiled, purporting to list the 96 "true Maratha" clans, but these lists vary greatly and are disputed. The list of ninety-six clans is divided into five ranked tiers, the highest of which contains the five primary Maratha clans.

Within a clan, ranking also depends on whether a man is progeny of proper marriage or a product of hypergamy. High ranking Maratha clans also historically held rights to hereditary estate or Watan.This included land grants, tax collection rights (revenue Patilki or policing (Police Patilki) of a village. Higher ranking clans held rights to larger estates or Jagirs. Clans with watan usually hold written genealogical records stretching back several generations.

== See also ==
- List of Maratha dynasties and states
- Maratha caste origin
