= Maratha (caste) =

Indian caste found predominantly in Maharashtra

- Religions: Hinduism
- Languages: Marathi; Konkani
- Country: India
- Populated states: Majority: Maharashtra; Minority: Goa, Karnataka, Telangana, Madhya Pradesh; Gujarat
- Region: Western India; Central India

The Maratha caste (Note: "Maratha", in a wider sense may be extended to include all who inhabit Maharashtra, and speak Marathi as their mother tongue.) is composed of 96 clans, originally formed in the earlier centuries from the amalgamation of families from the peasant (Kunbi), shepherd (Dhangar), blacksmith (Lohar), pastoral (Gavli), carpenter (Sutar), Bhandari, Thakar and Koli castes in Maharashtra. Many of them took to military service in the 16th century for the Deccan sultanates or the Mughals. Later in the 17th and 18th centuries, they served in the armies of the Maratha Kingdom, founded by Shivaji, a Maratha Kunbi by caste. Many Marathas were granted hereditary fiefs by the Sultanates, and Mughals for their service.

According to the Maharashtrian historian B. R. Sunthankar, and scholars such as Rajendra Vora, the "Marathas" are a "middle-peasantry" caste which formed the bulk of the Maharashtrian society together with the other Kunbi peasant caste. Vora adds that the Marathas account for around 30 per cent of the total population of the state and dominate the power structure in Maharashtra because of their numerical strength, especially in the rural society.

According to Jeremy Black, British historian at the University of Exeter, "Maratha caste is a coalescence of peasants, shepherds, ironworkers, etc. as a result of serving in the military in the 17th and 18th century". They are the dominant caste in rural areas and mainly constitute the landed peasantry. As of 2018, 80% of the members of the Maratha caste were farmers.

Marathas are subdivided into 96 different clans, known as the 96 Kuli Marathas or Shahānnau Kule. Three clan lists exist but the general body of lists are often at great variance with each other. These lists were compiled in the 19th century. There is not much social distinction between the Marathas and Kunbis since the 1950s.

The Maratha king Shivaji founded the Maratha Kingdom that included warriors and other notables from Maratha and several other castes from Maharashtra. It was dominant in India for much of the 18th century.

== Origin ==
Christopher Bayly writes that the Marathas, Jat and Rajput rulers mostly originated from peasant or nomadic populace.

Modern research has revealed that the Marathas and Kunbi have the same origin. Most recently, the Kunbi origin of the Maratha has been explained in detail by historians Richard Eaton and Stewart Gordon. Marathas who were distinguished from the Kunbi, in the past claimed genealogical connections with Rajputs of northern India. However, modern researchers demonstrate, giving examples, that these claims are not factual. Modern scholars agree that Marathas and Kunbi are the same. Anthropologist J. V. Ferreira writes: "The Maratha claim to belong to the ancient 96 Kshatriya families has no foundation in fact and may have been adopted after the Marathas became with Shivaji a power to be reckoned with". Gordon writes how the Maratha caste was generated from the Kunbis who served the Muslim rulers, prospered, and over time adopted different customs like different dressing styles, employed genealogists, started identifying as Maratha, and caste boundaries solidified between them. In the nineteenth century, economic prosperity rather than martial service to the Muslims replaced the mobility into Maratha identity. Eaton gives an example of the Holkar family that originally belonged to the Dhangar (shepherd) caste but was given a Maratha or even an "arch-Maratha" identity. The other example, given by Susan Bayly, is of the Bhonsles who originated among Maratha and Kunbi populations of the Deccani tiller-plainsmen. Similarly, scholars write that the Shinde (also known as Scindia) Maratha clan originated from the Kunbi caste and the Scindia's founder was a servant of the Peshwa who would carry his slippers. Dhanmanjiri Sathe states that "The line between Marathas and Kunbis is thin and sometimes difficult to ascertain". Iravati Karve, an anthropologist, showed how the Maratha caste was generated from Kunbis who simply started calling themselves "Maratha". She states that Maratha, Kunbi and Mali are the three main farming communities of Maharashtra – the difference being that the Marathas and Kunbis were "dry farmers" whereas the Mali farmed throughout the year. Cynthia Talbot quotes a saying in Maharashtra, "when a Kunbi prospers he becomes Maratha". The Kunbi origin has been one of the factors on the basis of which the head of Maharashtra State Backward Class Commission (MSBCC), a Judge, M.G. Gaikwad, and some others in 2018, stated that Maratha associations have submitted historical proofs and petitions to be included in the Other Backward Class. The decision for giving reservation in jobs and education for Marathas based on the petitions that Marathas and Kunbis are one and the same caste was upheld by the Mumbai court in 2019.

== History ==
The term Maratha referred broadly to all the speakers of the Marathi language. In the 17th century, it also served as a designation for peasants from the Deccan Plateau who served as soldiers in the armies of Muslim rulers and later in the armies of Shivaji. Thus, the term Maratha became a marker of an endogamous caste for them. A number of Maratha warriors, including Shivaji's father, Shahaji, originally served in those Muslim armies. By the mid-1660s, Shivaji had established an independent Maratha kingdom. After Shivaji's death, Marathas fought under his sons and defeated Aurangzeb in the Mughal–Maratha Wars. The Maratha empire was further expanded into a vast empire by the Maratha Confederacy including Peshwas, stretching from central India in the south to Peshawar (in modern-day Pakistan) on the Afghanistan border in the north, and with expeditions in Bengal to the east.

The Confederacy remained the pre-eminent power in India until their defeat by the British East India Company in the Third Anglo-Maratha War (1817–1818).

By the 19th century, the term Maratha had several interpretations in the British administrative records. In the Thane District Gazetteer of 1882, the term was used to denote elite layers within various castes: for example, "Maratha-Agri" within the Agri caste and "Maratha-Koli" within the Koli caste. In the Pune District, the words Kunbi and Maratha had become synonymous, giving rise to the Maratha-Kunbi caste complex. The Pune District Gazetteer of 1882 divided the Kunbis into two classes: Marathas and other Kunbis. The 1901 census listed three groups within the Maratha-Kunbi caste complex: "Marathas proper", "Maratha Kunbis" and Konkan Maratha.

According to Steele, in the early 19th century, Kunbis, who were agriculturists, and the Marathas who claimed Rajput descent and Kshatriya status, were distinguished by their customs related to widow remarriage. The Kunbis allowed it and the higher status Marathas prohibited it. However, there is no statistical evidence for this. However, the Kunbis and Marathas had hypergamous inter-community marriages – a rich Kunbi could always marry his daughter to a poor Maratha.

Historically, the Maratha population comprised more than 31% of the population in Maharashtra and the Kunbi was 7%, whereas the upper castes, Brahmins, Saraswat, and Prabhus, were earlier only about 4% of the population. The Other Backward Class population (other than the Kunbi) was 27% while the population of the Mahars was 12%.

Gradually, the term Maratha came to denote an endogamous caste. From 1900 onwards, the Satyashodhak Samaj movement defined the Marathas as a broader social category of non-Brahmin groups. These non-Brahmins gained prominence in the Indian National Congress during the Indian independence movement. In independent India, these Marathas became the dominant political force in the newly formed state of Maharashtra.

The ritual caste hierarchy in Maharashtra is led by the Deshasthas, Chitpawans, Karhades, Saraswats and the Chandraseniya Kayastha Prabhus. The Maratha are ranked lower under this classification than the above castes but are considered higher than the Kunbi, backward castes and castes that were considered ritually impure. According to the Chairperson of the Centre for Social Justice and Governance, this caste ranking is significant even in recent times in inter-caste matrimonial alliances between Maharashtrians.

== Internal diaspora ==
Expansion of Maratha Empire also resulted in the voluntary relocation of substantial numbers of Maratha and other Marathi-speaking people outside Maharashtra, and across a big part of India. Today several significant communities descended from these emigrants live in the north, south and west of India. These descendant communities tend often to speak the local languages, although many also speak Marathi in addition. Notable Maratha families outside Maharashtra include Bhonsle of Tanjore, Scindia of Gwalior, Gaekwad of Baroda, Holkar of Indore, Pawar of Dewas and Dhar, Ghorpade of Mudhol.

== Culture ==
=== Literacy ===
In 17th century Maharashtra, the Brahmins and CKPs were the communities that had a system of Sanskrit education in Gurukula or secular education in clerical work or book-keeping. Education of all other castes and communities consisted of listening to oral reproductions from sacred texts like the Puranas and Kirtans. However, despite lack of education, the Maratha caste due to their long tradition of service in military of the Yadavas and later the Muslim sultanates produced good soldiers and commanders.

Stewart Gordon writes that the prominent Ghorpade Maratha family, for instance, was not literate and had to use Brahmins as record keepers.

Gail Omvedt concludes that during the British era, the overall literacy of Brahmins and CKPs was overwhelmingly high as compared to the literacy of the Maratha and Kunbi communities where it was strikingly low. The artisan castes were intermediate in terms of literacy. For all castes, men were more literate than the women from that caste(respectively). Female literacy, as well as English literacy, showed the same pattern among castes. (Note: Omvedt does add a proviso saying that: There is difficulty in using such Census data, particularly because the various categories tended to be defined in different ways in different years, and different criteria were used in different provinces for classifying the population. Nonetheless, the overall trend is clear)

A Bhandari author from 1920s quotes, according to Monika Vaidya, that Brahmins are not to blame for the lack of education of Marathas, as shown by communities whose occupations required education, like the Prabhus, Saraswats and CKP. These communities got education despite the barriers imposed by the Brahmins and it has been argued that the need for reservations does not arise if each community tries for its own development.

=== Marriages ===
Like other Maharashtrian communities such as Kunbis, Malis, Mahars, etc., the marriage of a man to his maternal uncle's (mama in Marathi) daughter is common in the Maratha community. Maratha and Kunbis intermarried in a hypergamous way i.e. a rich Kunbi's daughter could always marry a poor Maratha. Anthropologist Donald Attwood shows giving an example of the Karekars of Ahmednagar that this trend continues even in recent times indicating that the social order is fluid and flexible.

==== Dowry Issues ====
Being a politically dominant caste, the Marathas have not been able to progress beyond the social practices of Dowry (Dowry refers to the durable goods, cash, and real or movable property that the bride's family gives to the bridegroom, his parents, or his relatives as a condition of the marriage.). 80% of the Maratha community are farmers and there have been cases where the Maratha farmers had to sell their lands just to get their daughters married. Data compiled by the Maratha Kranti Morcha members showed that the expenditure incurred by an average low income and poor Maratha family has doubled in the last 10 years when it comes to dowry. A member said (in 2018), "The dowry amount ranges from Rs 7 lakh to Rs 50 lakh, depending on the profession of the groom. The lower-middle class Marathas too often have to bear an expenditure of Rs 7 lakh to Rs 10 lakh for a daughter's wedding. Even in the remote villages, a small and marginal farmer spends Rs 2 lakh to Rs 3.5 lakh on a daughter's wedding." Some caste members tried to use the Morcha to address the issue of Dowry but they did not get a positive response. Dowry has now attained a status symbol in the community and that is part of the issue.

==== Widows ====
Research by a sociologist has shown that the restrictions faced by widows among Marathi Brahmins, Saraswats and CKP were significantly more than those faced by widows in Maratha caste.

=== Festivals and Gods ===
Rosalind O'Hanlon, Professor at the University of Oxford stated that the Hindu God Khandoba, also known by the name Mhasoba, is traditionally very popular in the Maratha caste. She quotes about the devotion of the Marathas in the 19th century to Mhasoba as follows:

You will not find a single family among the Marathas who do not set up in the grounds around their village some stone or other in the name of Mhasoba, smear it with red lead, and offer incense to it; who without taking Mhasoba's name will not put his hand to the seed-box of the plough, will not put the harrow to the field, and will not put the measure to the heap of threshed corn on the threshing floor.

Mhasoba was also worshiped by the Bhonsles. The other Hindu deity popular in the Maratha community is the Goddess Bhavani of Tuljapur.

Maratha leaders said that "Chhatrapati Shivaji is worshiped by the Maratha community, while different sections of society hold him in high esteem". "Shivaji Jayanti" (his birthday) is celebrated with folk dances, songs, plays and Puja. There was some controversy over the date but it is now celebrated on 19 February. Earlier, the regional Marathi political parties – Shiv Sena as well as the Maharashtra Navnirman Sena were celebrating it as per the Tithi according to the Hindu Calendar ("Falgun Vadya Tritiya" – third day of the month of Falgun), whereas the State Government was celebrating it as per the Gregorian Calendar.

== Varna status ==
Research by modern anthropologists and historians has shown that the Maratha caste originated from the amalgamation of families from the peasant communities that belonged to the Shudra Varna. However, after gaining political prominence with Shivaji's rise to power, this caste started claiming Kshatriya descent and genealogies were fabricated including those for Shivaji. Thus, the "96 clans"(Kuls)(96 Kuli Marathas or Shahānnau Kule) genealogies were concocted most likely after Shivaji came to power. Gordon explains that there are three such lists for the 96 clans compiled in the 19th century and they are "impossible to reconcile" due to this nature of origin of the caste. Jaffrelot writes that this process where Shudras pretend to be Kshatriyas and follow their customs is called "Kshatriyatization" and is a variation of Sanskritization.

Modern scholars such as M. S. A. Rao and Francine Frankel also agree that the Varna of Marathas remained Shudra, an indication being: "the maratha practice of hypergamy which permitted inter-marriage with rising peasant kunbi lineages, and created a hierarchy of maratha kuls, whose boundaries were flexible enough to incorporate, by the twentieth century, most of the kunbi population".

By the late 19th century, some Brahmins made public proclamations of their Shudra status but some moderate Brahmins were keen to ally with the influential Marathas of Bombay in the interests of Indian independence from Britain. These Brahmins, motivated by such political reasons, supported the Maratha claim to Kshatriya status, but the success in this political alliance was sporadic and fell apart entirely following independence in 1947.

As late as the turn of 20th century, the Brahmin priests of Shahu, the Maratha ruler of Kolhapur refused to use Vedic mantras and would not take a bath before chanting, on the grounds that even the leading Marathas such as Shahu and his family belonged to the Shudra varna. This opinion about the Shudra varna was supported by Brahmin Councils in Maharashtra and they stuck to their opinion even when they (the Brahmins) were threatened with the loss of land and property. This led to Shahu supporting Arya Samaj and Satyashodhak Samaj as well as campaigning for the rights of the Maratha community. He soon became the leader of the non-Brahmin movement and united the Marathas under his banner.

Gaikwad, the leader of Sambhaji Brigade, a prominent Maratha caste organisation, stated in an interview, that before Indian Independence, "Backward Class federation had raised the concerns of the Shudra communities including the Marathas".

Maratha caste does not have the upanayanam or "sacred thread ceremony" of ritually upper caste Hindus. However, despite the ritual status, the Marathas have significant political power.

In the 21st century, the Government of Maharashtra cited historical incidents for the claim of Shudra status of prominent Maratha families to form a case for reservation for the Marathas in the state. Additionally, a report by an independent commission in November 2018 concluded that the Maratha caste is educationally, socially and economically a backward community.

== Affirmative Action ==
In Karnataka, the Marathas are classified as Other Backward Class with the exception of the Marathas of Kodagu district who are classified as a Scheduled Tribe. In Maharashtra, they were classified as a Forward caste by the Mandal commission. In 2018, they were classified as Socially and Educationally Backward (SEBC) and were granted 16% reservation in jobs and education. In 2019, the court upheld the quota but recommended that the quota be cut to 12%.

In November 2022, the Government of Maharashtra declared that needy Maratha students who live in hostels would be getting a stipend of Indian Rupees sixty thousand per year.

== Inter-caste issues ==
=== Anti-Marwadi/Anti-Brahmin Deccan riots of 1875 ===
Claude Markovits, director of center of Indian and South-Asian studies, writes, that in 1875, in places such as Pune and Ahmednagar, Marwadi moneylenders became victims of coordinated attacks by the "local peasantry of the Maratha caste". Historian, David Ludlen states that the motivation for the violence was destroying the debt agreements that the moneylenders held over the Maratha farmers. These riots were known as the "Deccan riots". According to John McLane, the victims were mostly Marwadi moneylenders but Marathi speaking Brahmin moneylenders were usually spared. However, according to Lele, in Ahmednagar, Poona and Satara, the Marathas led the riots to challenge the Brahmins, who were a majority of the money lenders.

=== Anti-Brahmin Violence ===
Following the assassination of Gandhi in 1948 by Nathuram Godse, a Chitpawan Brahmin from Pune, other Brahmins in Maharashtra became targets of violence, mostly from elements from the Maratha caste. Later, in Sangli, Jains and Lingayats joined the Marathas in their attacks against the Brahmins. Thousands of offices and homes were also set on fire. Molestation incidents were also reported during these attacks. On the first day alone, the number of deaths in Bombay were 15, and 50 in Pune.

One scholar has observed, "It will be too much to believe that the riots took place because of the intense love of Gandhiji on the part of the Marathas. Godse became a very convenient hate symbol to damn the Brahmins and burn their properties." Donald Rosenthal opines that the motivation for the violence was the historic discrimination and humiliation that the Maratha community faced due to their caste status. He writes, "Even today, local Brahmins claim that the Marathas organized the riots to take political advantage of the situation".

In Satara alone, the official reports show that about 1000 houses were burnt in about 300 villages. There were "cruel, cold-blooded killings" as well – for example, one family whose last name happened to be 'Godse' had three of its male members killed. Brahmins suffered from serious physical violence as well as economic violence in the form of looting.

Maureen Patterson concludes that the greatest violence took place not in the cities of Mumbai, Pune and Nagpur – but in Satara, Kolhapur and Belgaum. Destruction was extensive in Kolhapur. Earlier in the century, Shahu of Kolhapur had actively collaborated with the British against the Indian freedom struggle which he identified being led by Chitpavan Brahmins such as Bal Gangadhar Tilak. Shahu was also actively involved in the anti-Brahmin movement as well. During the 1948 disturbances, in Sangli, the local Jain and the Lingayat communities joined the Marathas in the attacks against the Brahmins. Here, specifically, the factories owned by the Chitpawan Brahmins were destroyed. This event led to the hasty integration of the Patwardhan ruled princely states into the Bombay Province by March 1948.

=== Worli BDD Chawl violence ===
The BDD Chawl in the Worli inner suburb of Mumbai is a complex of buildings which were built in 1920s to house workers employed by the textile mills. In the 1970s, at the height of the Dalit Panther movement, fights between the Chawl's dominant Maratha population and the Neo-Buddhists living in 20-odd buildings resulted in full-scale riots. Violence between the communities continued through the 1970s to the early 1990s.

=== Other incidents of caste related violence ===
==== Bhandarkar Oriental Research Institute ====
Sambhaji Brigade is a branch of "Maratha Seva Sangh"(a Maratha caste organisation) and has committed acts of violence. In 2004, a mob of 150 Maratha activists attacked the Bhandarkar Oriental Research Institute - the reason being a book by James Laine. The vandalism led to loss of valuable historic documents and an estimated loss of Rs 1.25 crore. Sanskrit and religious documents dating back to the 16th century were destroyed, translation of the RigVeda by the Shankaracharya was thrown on the road. A woman who tried to call the police had bricks pelted at her by the mob.

==== Ram Ganesh Gadkari Statue ====
In 2017, the statue of Ram Ganesh Gadkari, a noted playwright and poet who showed Sambhaji in a poor light in his 1919 play 'Rajsanyas', was uprooted and thrown in the river by Sambhaji Brigade. The Chandraseniya Kayastha Prabhu(CKP), the community to which Gadkari belonged later organised a meeting to protest this incident at the "Ram Ganesh Gadkari Rangayatan"(a theatre named after Gadkari) in Thane. As per Smriti Koppikar, "the symbols and markers of Brahmin and/or upper caste ideology have proved to be an eyesore for Marathas". Devendra Fadnavis said that the statue would be restored. At the location of the bust, the "Brahman Mahasangh"(a Brahmin caste organisation) kept a photo of Gadkari and Medha Vishram Kulkarni supported the Brahmin organisation's decision and announced that parts of the play would be read in Sambhaji Park. The BJP as well as the Shiv Sena alleged that the Sambhaji Brigade was trying to divide the community. Nitesh Rane later rewarded the vandals and made inflammatory remarks claiming that he had announced a reward earlier in 2016 for removing the bust, and was proud of the act carried out by the accused.

==== Violence related to inclusion in the Other Backward Caste (OBC) ====
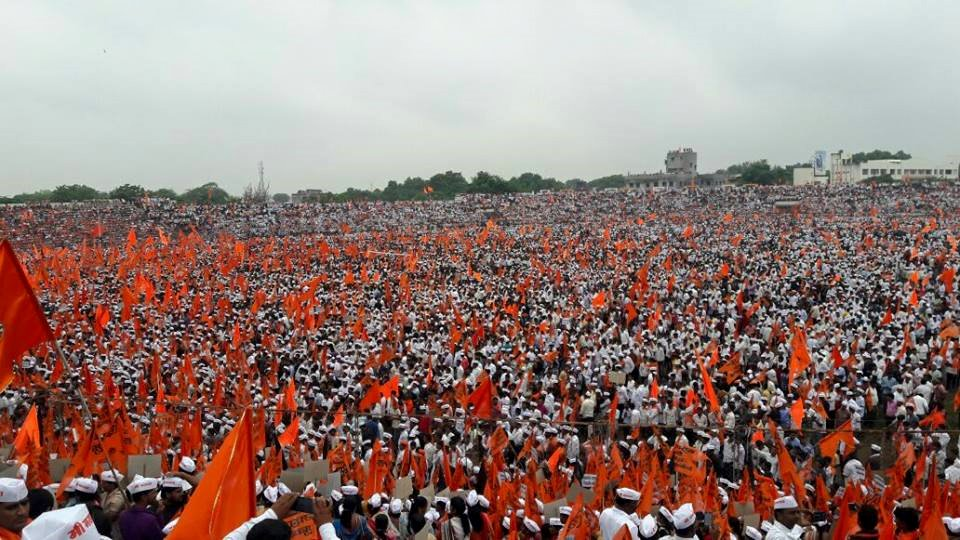

In 2018, several incidents of violence were reported due to agitation over the delay of the inclusion of the Maratha caste in the Other Backward Class category. The agitation was started by the Maratha Kranti Morcha. In June 2018, the Marathas threatened violent protests if their demands were not met. In July, Maratha protests turned violent as the protesters attacked police and torched police vehicles. Several incidents, including some deaths, were reported in other locations as well – several police were injured by the mobs, public property was damaged and private cars were torched. In Navi Mumbai itself, hundreds of vehicles were torched and buses were set on fire in cities such as Mumbai and Pune.

=== Other inter caste issues ===
==== Medha Khole Incident ====
In a widely publicised 2017 incident, a Brahmin scientist by the name of Medha Vinayak Khole(Deputy Director-General for the weather forecasting section) filed a police complaint against her Maratha domestic worker, Nirmala Yadav, for hiding her caste and "violating ritual purity and sanctity". Khole even insulted the latter's Gods, Khandoba (a popular God worshipped by most Marathi Hindu communities) and Mhasoba (a Hindu God worshiped by Pastoral communities and very popular in the Marathas). The "Akhil Bhartiya Bramhan Mahasangh" initially came out in support of Khole. However, there were widespread protests not just by Maratha caste organisations but also by non-caste organisations like Domestic Workers Unions and Women's organisations and Khole was widely criticised.

==== Kopardi gang rape and murder ====
A 15 year old girl from the Maratha (caste) was gang raped and murdered by three Dalit men in the village of Kopardi, in Ahmednagar district of Maharashtra. The victim's teeth and limb were broken and had bite marks all over her body.

Millions of Marathas protested in Western Maharastrian towns. Protests continued for six weeks against the rape murder. The three accused were convicted of the gang rape and murder.

== Political participation ==
The 1919 Montagu–Chelmsford Reforms of the British colonial government called for caste based representation in legislative council. In anticipation a Maratha league party was formed. The league and other groups came together to form the non-Brahmins party in the Marathi speaking areas in the early 1920s under the leadership of Maratha leaders Keshavrao Jedhe and Baburao Javalkar. Their early goals in that period were capturing the Ganpati and Shivaji festivals from Brahmin domination. They combined nationalism with anti-casteism as the party's aims. Later on in the 1930s, Jedhe merged the non-Brahmin party with the Congress party and changed the Congress party in the Maharashtra region from an upper-caste dominated body to a more broadly based but Maratha-dominated party. Apart from Jedhe, most Congress leaders from the Maratha /Kunbi community remained aloof from the Samyukta Maharashtra campaign of the 1950s. However, they have dominated the state politics of Maharashtra since its inception in 1960.

The INC was the preferred party of the Maratha/Kunbi community in the early days of Maharashtra and the party was long without a major challenger, and enjoyed overwhelming support from the Maratha dominated sugar co-operatives and thousands of other cooperative organisations involved in the rural agricultural economy of the state such as marketing of dairy and vegetable produce, credit unions etc. The domination by Marathas of the cooperative institutions and with it the rural economic power allowed the community to control politics from the village level up to the Assembly and Lok Sabha seats. Since the 1980s, this group has also been active in setting up private educational institutions. Major past political figures of Congress party from Maharashtra such as Panjabrao Deshmukh, Keshavrao Jedhe, Yashwantrao Chavan, Shankarrao Chavan and Vilasrao Deshmukh have been from this group. Sharad Pawar, who has been a towering figure in Maharashtrian and national politics, belongs to this group.

The state has had many Maratha government ministers and officials, as well as in local municipal councils, and panchayats. Marathas comprise around 32 per cent of the state population. 10 out of 16 chief ministers of Maharashtra hailed from the Maratha community as of 2012.

The rise of the Hindu Nationalist Shiv Sena and Bharatiya Janata Party in recent years have not dented Maratha representation in Maharashtra Legislative assembly.

Shiv Sena's strength mainly came from the Maratha support which it drew away from the Congress. In 1990, 24 MLAs elected from Shiv Sena were Marathas which increased to 33 in 2004 (more than 50%). Thus, researcher Vora concludes that the Shiv Sena has been emerging as a "Maratha Party".

Maratha Seva Sangh, a Maratha caste based organisation and its youth wing Sambhaji Brigade came into the political scene after the BORI attack. The group distances itself from the Hindu nationalist parties like the BJP and Shiv Sena and invokes a secular anti-Brahmin genealogy from Shivaji, Tukaram, Jyotirao Phule and B. R. Ambedkar. In late 2004, Maratha Seva Sangh announced that they had established a new religion called Shiv Dharma to protest "Vedic Brahminism" and oppose Hinduism. The details of this are published in Jijau Brigade va Sambhaji Brigade Sanskarmala, Maratha Sanskarmala I.

== Military service ==
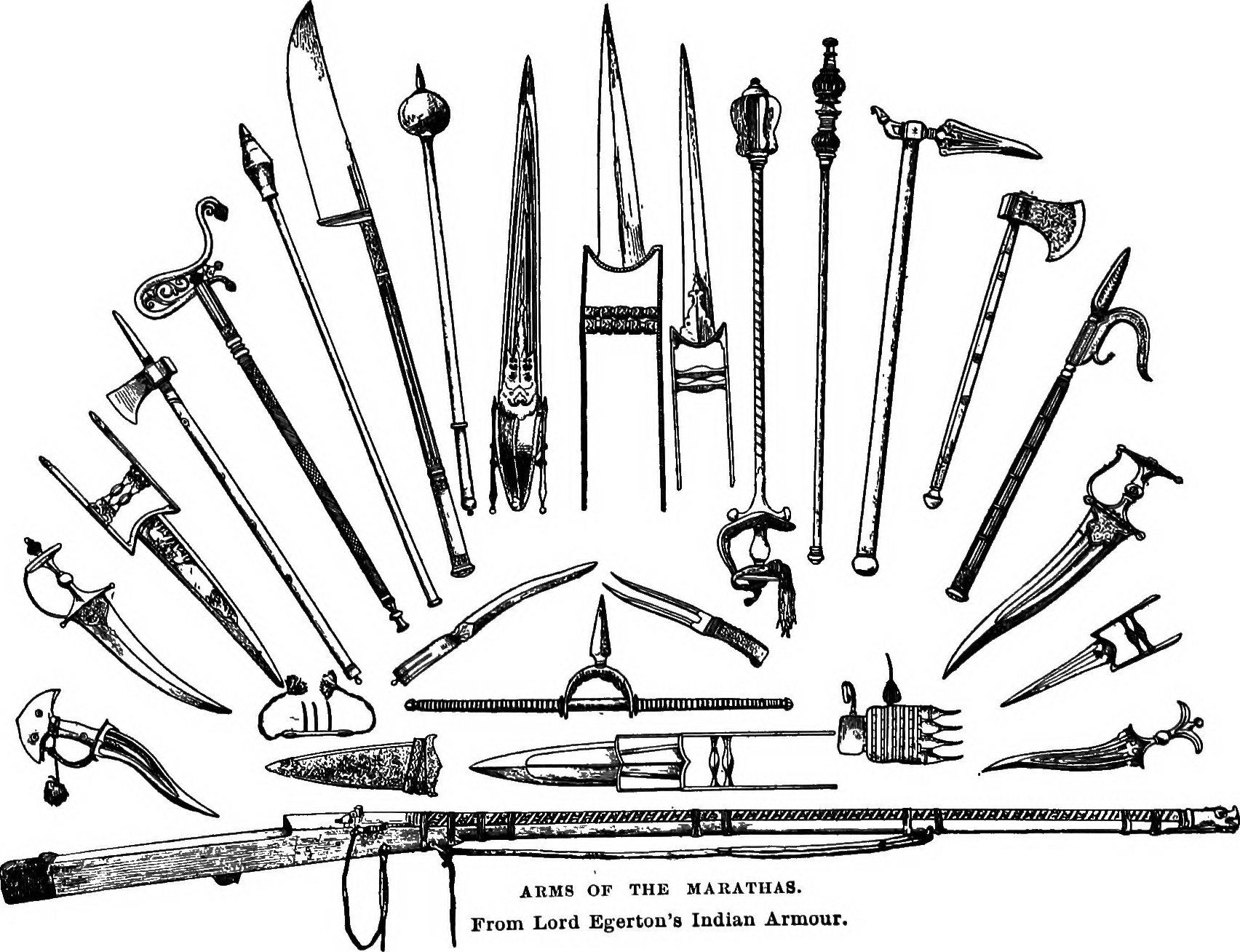
Weapons used by soldiers of Maratha empire.

The Duke of Wellington, after defeating the Marathas, noted that the Marathas, though poorly led by their Generals, had regular infantry and artillery that matched the level of that of the Europeans and warned other British officers from underestimating the Marathas on the battlefield. He cautioned one British general that: "You must never allow Maratha infantry to attack head on or in close hand to hand combat as in that your army will cover itself with utter disgrace".

Norman Gash says that the Maratha infantry was equal to that of British infantry. After the Third Anglo-Maratha war in 1818, Britain listed the Marathas as one of the Martial Races to serve in the British Indian Army although it was unclear whether this categorisation referred to the Maratha caste or a subset of some Marathi castes. Despite praising the military prowess of the Marathas, the British considered them inferior to Sikhs and Gurkhas in terms of other masculine traits due to prevailing Christian notions of being a "man at arm" in battlefield i.e., they disapproved of Maratha utilisation of guerrilla warfare in combat along with their uncharitable and ruthless attitudes. However, racial theories have been discredited.

Lord Roberts, commander-in-chief of the Indian Army 1885–1893, who came up with the "Martial Race" theory, stated that in order to improve the quality of the army, there was a need to use "more warlike and hardy races" instead of the current sepoys from Bengal, the Tamils, Telugus and the Marathas. Based on this theory, Gurkhas and Sikhs were recruited by the British army and they were "construed as martial races" in preference to other races in India. Historian Sikata Banerjee notes a dissonance in British military opinions of the Maratha, wherein the British portrayed them as both "formidable opponents" and yet not "properly qualified" for fighting in the western manner, criticising the Maratha guerrilla tactics as an improper way of war. Banerjee cites an 1859 statement as emblematic of this disparity:

There is something noble in the carriage of an ordinary Rajput, and something vulgar in that of the most distinguished Mahratta. The Rajput is the most worthy antagonist, the Mahratta the most formidable enemy.

The Maratha Light Infantry regiment is one of the "oldest and most renowned" regiments of the Indian Army. Its First Battalion, also known as the Jangi Paltan ("Warrior Platoon"), traces its origins to 1768 as part of the Bombay Sepoys.

The battle cry of Maratha Light Infantry is Bol Shri Chattrapati Shivaji Maharaj ki Jai! ("Hail Victory to Emperor Shivaji!") in tribute to the Maratha sovereign and their motto is Shatrujeet (victory over enemy).

== See also ==
- Maratha clan system
- List of Maratha dynasties and states
- List of notable Maratha People
- Marhatta region
- Maratha reservation agitation
- Thanjavur Marathi people
- Marathi People in Uttar Pradesh
