= Rindskopf =

Rindskopf is a German-Jewish surname, meaning "ox-head". People with this surname include:

- David Rindskopf, American psychologist
- Maurice H. Rindskopf (1917–2011), American submarine commander of World War II
- Peter Rindskopf (1942–1971), American lawyer, son of Maurice Rindskopf
