= Thomas Jolley =

American anti-Vietnam War activist

Thomas Glenn Jolley (January 26, 1944 – March 20, 2014) was an anti-Vietnam War protester who renounced his U.S. citizenship in Canada. Soon after his renunciation, Jolley crossed back into the U.S. and began working in Florida. A U.S. federal court ruled that he was deportable, but the Immigration and Naturalization Service could not actually deport him to Canada because he had lost his Canadian-landed immigrant status. He died in Asheville, North Carolina, at the age of 70.

== Early life and renunciation ==
Jolley was born in Greensboro, North Carolina. He grew up in Bremen, Georgia, and went on to attend the University of Georgia before transferring to the Georgia Institute of Technology; he initially hoped to study to become an architect, but he later changed his course of study to journalism. He registered for the Selective Service System and was given a II-S student deferment. He married Margaret Elizabeth Thompson of Atlanta on November 6, 1966. In January or February 1967, he withdrew from university. He attempted to obtain 1-O conscientious objector status, but was denied, and was instead classified 1-A (available for induction). After twice being ordered to report for induction, he was arrested by the Federal Bureau of Investigation in February 1967 and charged with violating the Selective Service Act. He then crossed the border into Canada with his American wife, obtained landed immigrant status there (though not Canadian citizenship), and in May went to the United States Consulate in Toronto and renounced his citizenship. His oath of renunciation was signed before U.S. Consul Richard J. Dols.

== Deportation case ==
Jolley later returned to the United States, apparently via Detroit. He then went south and began working as a news reporter for the Tallahassee Democrat in Tallahassee, Florida, while his wife enrolled in graduate school at Florida State University. After the news of his situation went public, Democrat managing editor William Phillips, who made the decision to hire Jolley, commented that the paper had received equal numbers of letters of support and hate mail for its decision not to fire Jolley.

The U.S. government ordered Jolley deported, but he did not depart the country voluntarily, and so on February 22, 1968, he was again arrested by FBI agents. He was released on a $3,000 bond pending formal deportation proceedings against him. U.S. media described him as a "draft evader". Others called him a "modern-day Philip Nolan", a reference to the main character of the American Civil War short story The Man Without a Country.

Represented by attorney Peter Rindskopf, Jolley appealed his case to the Board of Immigration Appeals in April 1969, but the Board ruled against him in March 1970. He appealed again to the Court of Appeals for the Fifth Circuit, which, in April 1971, also ruled against him. The court struck down his argument that his renunciation was involuntary because he was being forced into military service, instead ruling that it indeed constituted voluntary relinquishment within the meaning of Afroyim v. Rusk. However, Richard Rives wrote a dissenting opinion arguing that the U.S. government should allow Jolley's appeal and prosecute him for draft evasion instead. Jolley attempted to appeal the Fifth Circuit's ruling to the Supreme Court, but not a single justice recommended granting certiorari, meaning the Court would not hear his case. After this news came out, Jolley stated that he would not pursue further any further legal actions.

== Aftermath ==
Jolley was thus declared deportable, but before he could be deported, another country would have to be found to accept him. A spokesman for the Department of Citizenship and Immigration Canada stated that Jolley may have lost his landed immigrant status due to his long absence from Canada, but he could apply for immigration permission again at a Canadian port of entry. Jolley was given 90 days to voluntarily depart the country, failing which the government would commence removal proceedings on February 7, 1972, but in January that year, Representatives Phillip Burton and Ron Dellums (both D-CA) sponsored separate private bills to grant a green card to Jolley, and the House Committee on the Judiciary asked the Department of Justice to provide a full report about Jolley. The removal process was suspended while the bill was under consideration. The following year, Dellums sponsored another private bill to the same effect, but no further action was taken in 2021.

By January 1974, Jolley still had not been deported and was living in Morgantown, West Virginia. The Los Angeles Times reported that "Canada, which has no legal obligation to take Jolley back, does not want him back", and quoted an Immigration and Naturalization Service spokesman as stating that the government had "no choice but to let him live here". With no country to which he could be deported, it was expected that he might spend the rest of his life living in the United States as a deportable alien.

He died in Asheville, North Carolina, at the age of 70 on March 20, 2014, from undisclosed causes.
