= Union List =

Aspect of Indian constitution

The Union List, also known as List-I, is a list of 97 numbered items (after 101st Constitutional amendment act 2016, entry 92 and 92c removed) given in Seventh Schedule in the Constitution of India on which Parliament has exclusive power to legislate. The legislative section is divided into three lists: the Union List, State List and Concurrent List. In India, residual powers remain with the Central Government. This makes the government of India similar to the Canadian federal government, and different from the governments of the United States, Switzerland, or Australia.

== Items on union list ==
There are 97 numbered items on the list. These are:

01. Defence of India and every part there of including preparation for defence and all such acts as may be conducive in times of war to its prosecution and after its termination to effective demobilisation.
02. Naval, military and air forces; any other armed forces of the Union.
2A. Deployment of any armed forces of the Union or any other force subject to the control of the Union or any contingent or unit thereof in any State in aid of the civil power; powers, jurisdiction, privileges and liabilities of the members of such forces while on such deployment.
03. Delimitation of cantonment areas, local self-government in such areas, the constitution and powers within such areas of cantonment authorities and the regulation of house accommodation (including the control of rents) in such areas.
04. Naval, military and air force works.
05. Arms, firearms, ammunition and explosives.
06. Atomic energy and mineral resources necessary for its production.
07. Industries declared by Parliament by law to be necessary for the purpose of defence or for the prosecution of war.
08. Central Bureau of Intelligence and Investigation.
09. Preventive detention for reasons connected with Defence, Foreign Affairs, or the security of India; persons subjected to such detention.
10. Foreign affairs; all matters which bring the Union into relation with any foreign country.
11. Diplomatic, consular and trade representation.
12. United Nations Organisation.
13. Participation in international conferences, associations and other bodies and implementing of decisions made thereat.
14. Entering into with foreign countries and implementing of treaties, agreements and conventions with foreign Countries.
15. War and peace.
16. Foreign jurisdiction.
17. Citizenship, naturalisation and aliens.
18. Extradition.
19. Admission into, and emigration and expulsion from, India; passports and visas.
20. Pilgrimages to places outside India.
21. Piracies and crimes committed on the high seas or in the air; offences against the law of nations committed on land or the high seas or in the air.
22. Railways.
23. Highways declared by or under law made by Parliament to be national highways.
24. Shipping and navigation on inland waterways, declared by Parliament by law to be national waterways, as regards mechanically propelled vessels; the rule of the road on such waterways.
25. Maritime shipping and navigation, including shipping and navigation on tidal waters; provision of education and training for the mercantile marine and regulation of such education and training provided by States and other agencies.
26. Lighthouses, including lightships, beacons and other provision for the safety of shipping and aircraft.
27. Ports declared by or under law made by Parliament or existing law to be major ports, including their delimitation, and the constitution and powers of port authorities therein.
28. Port quarantine, including hospitals connected therewith; seamen's and marine hospitals.
29. Airways aircraft and air navigation; provision of aerodromes; regulation and organisation of air traffic, and of aerodromes; provision for aeronautical education and training and regulation of such education and training provided by States and other agencies.
30. Carriage of passengers and goods by railway, sea or air, or by national waterways in mechanically propelled vessels.
31. Posts and telegraphs, telephones, wireless, broadcasting and other like forms of communication.
32. Property of the Union and the revenue therefrom, but as regards property situated in a State subject to legislation by the State, save in so far as Parliament by law otherwise provides.
33. ~~Acquisition or requisitioning of property for the purposes of the Union~~(As per Seventh Amendment) Act,1956
34. Courts of wards for the estates of Rulers of Indian States.
35. Public debt of the Union.
36. Currency, coinage and legal tender; foreign exchange.
37. Foreign loans.
38. Reserve Bank of India.
39. Post Office Savings Bank.
40. Lotteries organised by the Government of India or the Government of a State.
41. Trade and commerce with foreign countries import and export across customs frontiers definition of customs frontiers.
42. Inter-State trade and commerce.
43. Incorporation, regulation and winding up of trading Corporations, including banking, insurance and financial corporations but not including Co-operative Societies.
44. Incorporation, regulation and winding up of corporations, whether trading or not, with objects not confined to one State, but not including universities.
45. Banking.
46. Bills of exchange, cheques, promissory notes and other like instruments.
47. Insurance.
48. Stock exchanges and futures markets.
49. Patents, inventions and designs; copyright; trade-marks and merchandise marks.
50. Establishment of standards of weight and measure.
51. Establishment of standards of quality for goods to be exported out of India or transported from one State to another.
52. Industries, the control of which by the Union is declared by Parliament by law to be expedient in the public interest.
53. Regulation and development of oilfields and mineral oil resources; petroleum and petroleum products; other liquids and substances declared by Parliament by law to be dangerously inflammable.
54. Regulation of mines and mineral development to the extent to which such regulation and development under the control of the Union is declared by Parliament by law to be expedient in the public interest.
55. Regulation of labour and safety in mines and oil-fields.
56. Regulation and development of inter-State rivers and river valleys to the extent to which such regulation and development under the control of the Union is declared by Parliament by law to be expedient in the public interest.
57. Fishing and fisheries beyond territorial waters.
58. Manufacture, supply and distribution of salt by Union agencies; regulations and control of manufacture, supply and distribution of salt by other agencies.
59. Cultivation, manufacture, and sale for export, of opium.
60. Sanctioning of cinematograph films for exhibition.
61. Industrial disputes concerning Union employees.
62. The institutions known at the commencement of this Constitution as the National Library, the Indian Museum, the Imperial War Museum, the Victoria Memorial and the Indian War Memorial, and any other like institution financed by the Government of India wholly or in part and declared by Parliament by law to be an institution of national importance.
63. The institutions known at the commencement of this Constitution as the Benares Hindu University, the Aligarh Muslim University and the Delhi University; the University established in pursuance of Article 371-E; any other institution declared by Parliament by law to be an institution of national importance.
64. Institutions for scientific or technical education financed by the Government of India wholly or in part and declared by Parliament by law to be institutions of national importance.
65. Union agencies and institutions for -

(a) professional, vocational or technical training, including the training of police officers; or
(b) the promotion of special studies or research; or
(c) scientific or technical assistance in the investigation or detection of crime.

66. Co-ordination and determination of standards in institutions for higher education or research and scientific and technical institutions.
67. Ancient and historical monuments and records, and archaeological sites and remains, declared by or under law made by Parliament to be of national importance.
68. The Survey of India, the Geological, Botanical, Zoological and Anthropological Surveys of India; Meteorological organisations.
69. Census.
70. Union public services; all-India services; Union Public Service Commission.
71. Union Pensions, that is to say, pensions payable by the Government of India or out of the Consolidated Fund of India.
72. Elections to Parliament, to the Legislatures of States and to the offices of President and Vice-President; the Election Commission.
73. Salaries and allowances of members of Parliament, the Chairman and Deputy chairman of the Council of States and the Speaker and Deputy Speaker of the House of the People.
74. Powers, privileges and Immunities of each House of Parliament and of the members and the Committees of each House enforcement of attendance of persons for giving evidence or producing documents before committees of Parliament or commissions appointed by Parliament.
75. Emoluments, allowances, privileges, and rights in respect of leave of absence, of the President and Governors salaries and allowances of the Ministers for the Union; the Salaries, allowances, and rights in respect of leave of absence and other conditions of service of the Comptroller and Auditor General.
76. Audit of the accounts of the Union and of the States.
77. Constitution, organisation, jurisdiction and powers of the Supreme Court (including contempt of such Court), and the fees taken therein persons entitled to practice before the Supreme Court.
78. Constitution and organisation (including vacations) of the High Courts except provisions as to officers and servants of High Courts; persons entitled to practice before the High Courts.
79. Extensions of the jurisdiction of a High Court to, and exclusion of the jurisdiction of a High Court from any Union territory.
80. Extension of the powers and jurisdiction of members of a police force belonging to any State to any area outside that State, but not so as to enable the police of one State to exercise powers and jurisdiction in any area outside that State without the consent of the Government of the State in which such area is situated; extension of the powers and jurisdiction of members of a police force belonging to any State to railway areas outside that State.
81. Inter-state migration; inter-State quarantine.
82. Taxes on income other than agricultural income.
83. Duties of customs including export duties.
84. Duties of excise on tobacco and other goods manufactured or produced in India except—

(a) alcoholic liquors for human consumption.
(b) opium, Indian hemp and other narcotic drugs and narcotics,

but including medicinal and toilet preparations containing alcohol or any substance included in sub-paragraph (b) of this entry.

85. Corporation tax.
86. Taxes on the capital value of the assets, exclusive of agricultural land, of individuals and companies; taxes on the capital of companies.
87. Estate duty in respect of property other than agricultural land.
88. Duties in respect of succession to property other than agricultural land.
89. Terminal taxes on goods or passengers, carried by railway, sea or air; taxes on railway fares and freights.
90. Taxes other than stamp duties on transactions in stock exchanges and futures markets.
91. Rates of stamp duty in respect of bills of exchange, cheques, promissory notes, bills of lading, letters of credit, policies of insurance, transfer of shares, debentures, proxies and receipts.
92. ~~Taxes on the sale or purchase of newspapers and on advertisements published therein.~~ (omitted as per 101st Amendment Act)
92A. Taxes on the sale or purchase of goods other than newspapers, where such sale or purchase takes place in the course of inter-State trade or commerce.
92B. Taxes on the consignment of goods (whether the consignment is to the person making it or to any other person), where such consignment takes place in the course of inter-State trade or commerce.
92C. ~~Taxes on services.~~ (omitted as per 101st Amendment Act)
93. Offences against laws with respect to any of the matters in this List.
94. Inquiries, surveys and statistics for the purpose of any of the matters in this List.
95. Jurisdiction and powers of all courts, except the Supreme Court, with respect to any of the matters in this List admiralty jurisdiction.
96. Fees in respect of any of the matters in this List, but not including fees taken in any court.
97. Any other matter not enumerated in List II or List III including any tax not mentioned in either of those Lists.

== See also ==
- State List
- Concurrent List
- Constitution of India
- Seventh Schedule to the Constitution of India
- Federalism in India
- Part Eleven of the Constitution of India
