= State governments of India =

Governments of the 28 Indian states and three union territories

The state governments of India are the governments ruling over the 28 states and three union territories (there are eight union territories but only three union territories have legislative assemblies as well as governments) of India with the head of Council of Ministers in every state being the Chief Minister, who also serves as the head of the government. Power is divided between the Union Government (federal government) and the state governments. The federal government appoints a Governor for each state, who serves as the ceremonial head of state, and a Lieutenant Governor (or Administrator) for certain union territories, whose powers vary depending on the specific union territory.

Each state has a legislative assembly. A state legislature that has one house – the State Legislative Assembly (Vidhan Sabha) – is a unicameral legislature. A state legislature that has two houses – the State Legislative Assembly and State Legislative Council (Vidhan Parishad) – is a bicameral legislature. The Vidhan Sabha is the lower house and corresponds to the Lok Sabha (House of the people) while the Vidhan Parishad is the upper house and corresponds to the Rajya Sabha (Council of States) of the Parliament of India.

While the Union government handles defence, external affairs etc., the state government deals with subjects in the State List, such as public order, police, prisons, public health, agriculture, local government, land, and fisheries, etc.

Income for the Union government is from customs duty, excise tax, income tax etc., while state government income comes from State GST (SGST), State excise duty (on liquor and related items), stamp duty and registration fees, land revenue, and vehicle tax, etc. After the implementation of GST, several state-level indirect taxes—such as sales tax (VAT on goods, except petroleum products and alcohol), entertainment tax (except those levied by local bodies), entry tax, and luxury tax—were subsumed into the Goods and Services Tax (GST) system.

The Sarkaria Commission was set up to review the balance of power between states' and the Union governments. The Union government can dissolve a state government in favour of President's rule if necessary, subject to certain conditions, as ruled by the Supreme Court of India in S. R. Bommai v. Union of India. It is for 5 years only.

== Legislative ==
For every state, there is a legislature, which consists of a Governor and either one or two houses.

State/Union Territory	Legislature type	Size		
State/Union Territory	Legislature type	Lower	Upper	Total
Andhra Pradesh	Bicameral	175	58	233
Arunachal Pradesh	Unicameral	60	—N/a	60
Assam	Unicameral	126	—N/a	126
Bihar	Bicameral	243	75	318
Chhattisgarh	Unicameral	90	—N/a	90
Delhi	Unicameral	70	—N/a	70
Goa	Unicameral	40	—N/a	40
Gujarat	Unicameral	182	—N/a	182
Haryana	Unicameral	90	—N/a	90
Himachal Pradesh	Unicameral	68	—N/a	68
Jammu and Kashmir	Unicameral	90	—N/a	90
Jharkhand	Unicameral	81	—N/a	81
Karnataka	Bicameral	224	75	299
Kerala	Unicameral	140	—N/a	140
Madhya Pradesh	Unicameral	230	—N/a	230
Maharashtra	Bicameral	288	78	366
Manipur	Unicameral	60	—N/a	60
Meghalaya	Unicameral	60	—N/a	60
Mizoram	Unicameral	40	—N/a	40
Nagaland	Unicameral	60	—N/a	60
Odisha	Unicameral	147	—N/a	147
Puducherry	Unicameral	30 (Note: 3 additional seats are nominated by Government of India)	—N/a	33
Punjab	Unicameral	117	—N/a	117
Rajasthan	Unicameral	200	—N/a	200
Sikkim	Unicameral	32	—N/a	32
Tamil Nadu	Unicameral	234	—N/a	234
Telangana	Bicameral	119	40	159
Tripura	Unicameral	60	—N/a	60
Uttar Pradesh	Bicameral	403	100	503
Uttarakhand	Unicameral	70	—N/a	70
West Bengal	Unicameral	294	—N/a	294
Total	—	4,123	426	4,547

=== Legislative Council ===
6 out of 28 states have bicameral legislatures, namely Andhra Pradesh, Bihar, Karnataka, Maharashtra, Telangana, and Uttar Pradesh, with the remaining states having a unicameral one. Parliament may, by law, provide for the abolition of an existing Legislative Council or for the creation of one where it does not exist, if the proposal is supported by a resolution of the Legislative Assembly of the state concerned.

The Legislative Council of a state comprises not more than one-third of the total number of members in the legislative assembly of the state and in no case fewer than 40 members. About one-third of members of the Council are elected by members of the legislative assembly from amongst persons who are not its members, one-third by electorates consisting of members of municipalities, district boards and other local authorities in the state, one-twelfth by an electorate consisting of persons who have been, for at least three years, engaged in teaching in educational institutions within the state not lower in standard than secondary school and a further one-twelfth by registered graduates of more than three years' standing. Remaining members are nominated by the Governor from among those who have distinguished themselves in literature, science, art, cooperative movement and social service. Legislative Councils are not subject to dissolution but one-third of their members retire every second year.

==== Legislative councils by ruling parties ====
Ruling party	States/UTs
NDA (4)
Bharatiya Janata Party	3
Telugu Desam Party	1
INDIA (2)
Indian National Congress	2

The Bharatiya Janata Party-led National Democratic Alliance is in power in 4 legislative councils; the Indian National Congress-led Indian National Developmental Inclusive Alliance is in power in 2 legislative councils; and 30 other states/union territories do not have a legislative council.

=== Legislative Assembly ===
The Legislative Assembly of a state consists of not more than 500 and not fewer than 60 members (Legislative Assembly of Sikkim has 32 members, while Puducherry has 33, Goa and Mizoram have 40 seats each vide Article 371F of the Constitution) chosen by direct election from territorial constituencies in the state. Demarcation of territorial constituencies is to be done in such a manner that the ratio between population of each constituency and number of seats allotted to it, as far as practicable, is the same throughout the state. The term of an assembly is five years unless it is dissolved earlier.

==== Legislative assemblies by ruling parties ====
The Bharatiya Janata Party-led National Democratic Alliance is in power in 22 legislative assemblies; the Indian National Developmental Inclusive Alliance is in power in 6 legislative assemblies while three legislative assemblies are ruled by three other parties.

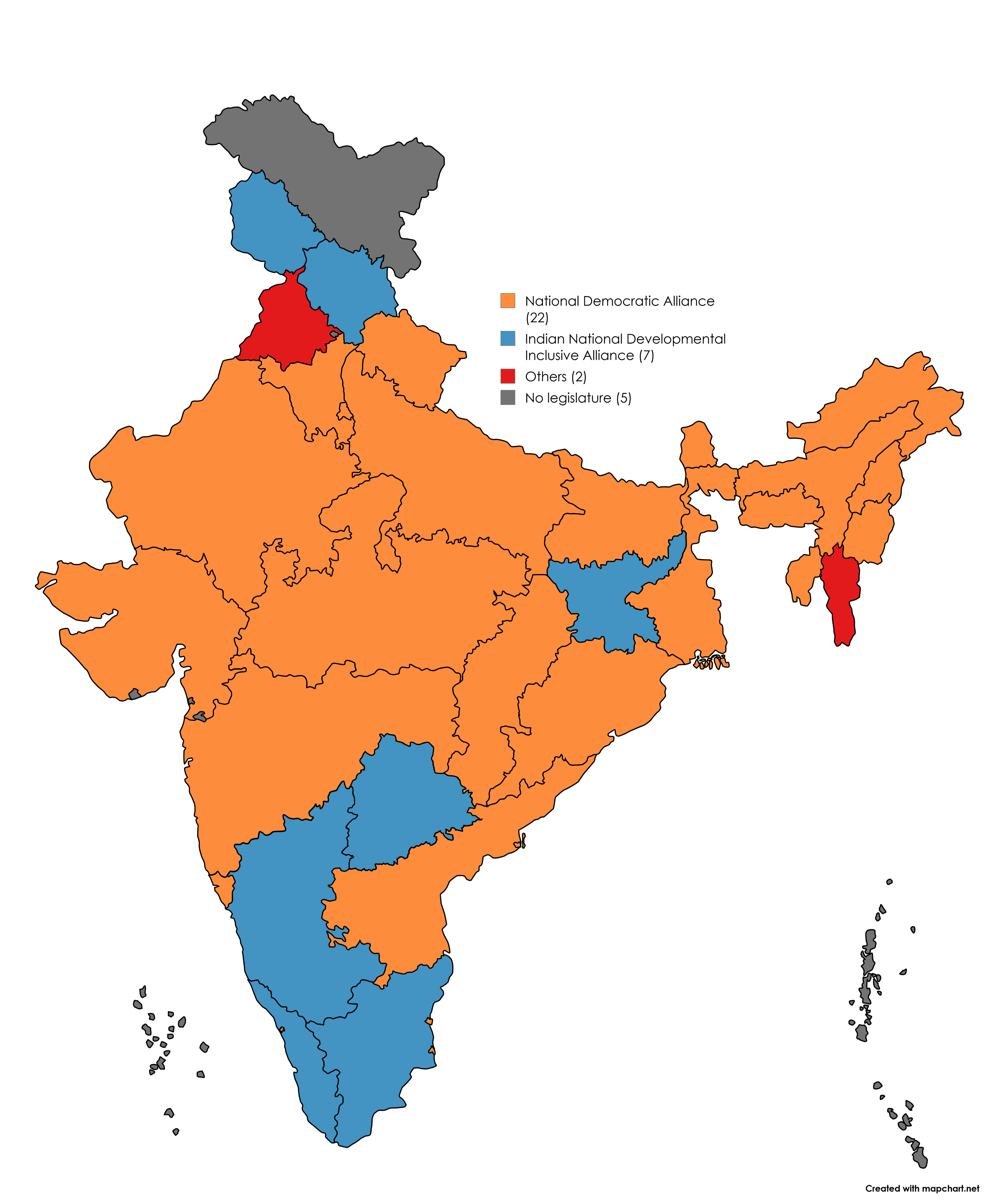
Colour-coded map of India showing the ruling alliances in various states and union territories: National Democratic Alliance (22) Indian National Developmental Inclusive Alliance (7) Others (2) No legislature (5)

List by ruling party
Ruling alliance/party	States/UT
National Democratic Alliance (22)
Bharatiya Janata Party	17
All India N.R. Congress	1
Naga People's Front	1
National People's Party	1
Sikkim Krantikari Morcha	1
Telugu Desam Party	1
Indian National Developmental Inclusive Alliance (7)
Indian National Congress	4
Jammu & Kashmir National Conference	1
Jharkhand Mukti Morcha	1
Tamilaga Vettri Kazhagam	1
Others (2)
Aam Aadmi Party	1
Zoram People's Movement	1

=== Powers and Functions ===
State legislature has exclusive powers over subjects enumerated in the State List (List II of the Seventh Schedule) of the Constitution and concurrent powers over those enumerated in sub List III. Financial powers of legislature include authorization of all expenditure, taxation and borrowing by the state government. The Legislative Assembly alone has the power to originate money bills. The Legislative Council can only make recommendations in respect of changes it considers necessary within a period of fourteen days of the receipt of money bills from the Legislative Assembly, which can accept or reject these recommendations.

The Governor of a state may reserve any Bill for the consideration of the President. Bills relating to subjects like the compulsory acquisition of property, measures affecting powers and position of High Courts, and the imposition of taxes on storage, distribution, and sale of water or electricity in Inter-state River or river valley development projects should necessarily be so reserved. No Bills seeking to impose restrictions on inter-state trade can be introduced in a state legislature without the previous sanction of the President.

State legislatures, apart from exercising the usual power of financial control, use all normal parliamentary devices like questions, discussions, debates, adjournments, and no-confidence motions and resolutions to keep a watch over the day-to-day work of the executive. They also have their own committees on estimates and public accounts to ensure that grants sanctioned by the legislature are properly utilized.

There are, overall, 4,121 legislative assembly seats in states and Union territories of India. Andhra Pradesh abolished its Legislative Council in 1984, but set up a new Legislative Council following elections in 2007.

== Executive ==
The state executive consists of a Governor and the State Council of Ministers, with the Chief Minister as its head.

=== Governor ===
The Governor of a state is appointed by the President of India for a term of five years and holds office during their pleasure. Only Indian citizens above 35 years of age are eligible for appointment to this office.

Executive power of the state is vested in the Governor. All Governors are obligated to discharge their constitutional functions such as the appointment of the Chief Minister of a state, sending a report to the President on the failure of the Constitutional machinery in a state or in respect of matters relating to assent to passing a bill in the state assembly.

Similarly, in respect of Arunachal Pradesh, its Governor has special responsibility under Article 371H of the Constitution with respect to law and order and in discharge of his functions in relation thereto. The Governor exercises his individual judgement as to the action to be taken after consulting the Council of Ministers. These are, however, temporary provisions. If the President of India, on receipt of a report from Governor or otherwise is satisfied that it is no longer necessary for the Governor to have special responsibilities with respect to law and order, he may so direct by an order.

Likewise, in the Sixth Schedule which applies to tribal areas of Assam, Meghalaya, Tripura and Mizoram as specified in para 20 of that Schedule, discretionary powers are given to the Governor in matters relating to sharing of royalties between the district councils and the state government. The Sixth Schedule vests additional discretionary powers in the Governors of Mizoram and Tripura in almost all their functions (except approving regulations for levy of taxes and money lending by non-tribal district councils) since December 1998. In Sikkim, the Governor has been given special responsibility for peace and social and economic advancement of different sections of population.

=== Council of Ministers ===
The Chief Minister is appointed by the Governor, who also appoints other ministers on the advice of the Chief Minister. The Council of Ministers is collectively responsible to the Legislative Assembly of the state.

The Council of Ministers with the Chief Minister as its head aids and advises the Governor in exercise of his functions except in so far as he is by or under the Constitution required to exercise his functions or any of them at his discretion. In respect of Nagaland, its Governor has special responsibility under Article 371 A of the Constitution with respect to law and order and even though it is necessary for him to consult Council of Ministers in matters relating to law and order, he can exercise his individual judgement as to the action to be taken.

The State Secretariat serves as the administrative headquarters of a state government, functioning as the central hub for policy formulation, implementation, and interdepartmental coordination. This complex of buildings houses the offices of the Chief Minister, Cabinet Ministers, and Secretaries, who are senior civil servants (typically Indian Administrative Service officers) responsible for the administrative oversight of various government departments.

The Secretariat is the top most echelon of the State administration and its main function is to assist the political executive – the Chief Minister and other Ministers - in maintaining peace and law and order and designing policies for the socio-economic development of the State as well as in carrying out legislative responsibilities of the government.The political executive is elected for a fixed tenure, but the Secretariat consists of civil servants and others who are permanent employees of the government.

State government functionaries includes:

==== Political leadership ====
- Chief Minister: The elected head of the government. Chief minister heads a state government's council of ministers and can be deputised in that role by a deputy chief minister. The chief minister generally selects the chief secretary and can also allot departments to the cabinet ministers of their state and ministers of state.
- Cabinet Minister: The political head of the department, responsible for the overall policy direction and functioning of the department. They are the political head of their departments. They are accountable to the state legislature.
- Minister of State (MoS): A Minister of State is a junior minister in the Council of Ministers in the State Government who may assist a cabinet minister or have independent charge of a ministry/department. A Minister of State with independent charge is a minister without an overseeing Cabinet Minister in the government.

The Chief Ministers frequently assumes responsibility for several key ministerial portfolios, including but not limited to Departments of Home and General Administration. The Ministers head different departments, make policies, and oversee administration. They ensure implementation of government decisions, supervise their departments, and answer to the legislature. All ministers work together under the principle of collective responsibility.

=== Administrative machinery ===
In a state government, the civil service constitutes the permanent executive, responsible for implementing government policies and programmes, and ensuring administrative continuity irrespective of political changes. The state civil service is non-political, professional, and permanent, functioning under the supervision of the political executive. The Chief Secretary is the head of the state civil service. It consists mainly of officers from the All India Services (such as the Indian Administrative Service, Indian Police Service, and Indian Forest Service) and the State Civil Services (such as the State Administrative Service and State Police Service). Recruitment to the State Civil Services is conducted by the State Public Service Commission (SPSC).

- Special Officer: There is a silent power who have the full power and authority in CYBER ISSUES in this state, which the PRESIDENT OF INDIA appointed, The SPECIAL OFFICER of Kerala one mister SRI. MISHAL HAMZA. KK, but he is considerd as the silent person in Kerala, the person who protect the state with full authority and power in EXTERNAL AFFAIRS, he is only answerable to the GOVERNOR AND HOME MINISTER. This act come under the Foreign External issue. Due to the high cyber arrogence happened in Kerala on last year, this will affect the perstiage of India in EXTERNAL AFFAIRS. The Due date (11-08-2025). (KERALA)
- Chief Secretary: The Chief Secretary, an Indian Administrative Service (IAS) officer, is the highest-ranking executive official and head of the state civil service. Serving as the principal advisor to the Chief Minister on all matters of state administration, the Chief Secretary also functions as the ex-officio Secretary to the State Cabinet, hence referred to as the Secretary to the Cabinet. The Chief Minister nominates the officer, and the Governor formally appoints the Chief Secretary, who serves without a fixed tenure.
- Secretary to Government: a senior civil servant (typically an IAS officer), additional chief secretary/principal secretary/secretary serves as the administrative head of a ministry/department within the Secretariat. This individual advises the concerned Minister, oversees policy formulation and implementation, and manages the ministry/department's administrative functions. The Secretary is supported by special secretaries, additional secretaries, joint secretaries, deputy secretaries, under secretaries, and other secretariat staff.
- Heads of Departments (HODs): each department or agency is headed by a Head of Department (HOD), responsible for the day-to-day administration and operations of their respective departments. These HODs report to the Secretary of the concerned administrative department (Secretariat department). Examples of such positions include the Director General of Police, Director of General Education, Director of Panchayats, Commissioner of Land Revenue, Commissioner of Food Safety, Transport Commissioner, Excise Commissioner, etc.
- Divisional/District level administration: Some Indian states are divided into divisions, each comprising multiple districts, while others are directly divided into districts. Divisional administration is overseen by a Divisional Commissioner, whereas district administration is led by the Collector/District Magistrate. Each field or executive department has its own divisional and district-level officials responsible for managing the affairs of their respective departments at those levels.

Each secretariat department is in charge of a number of executive departments. The executive departments/agencies implement the government policies and works at field level. This number varies over a wide range with some departments taking charge of a much larger number of executive heads than others. Some of the secretariat departments are engaged in advisory and controlling functions and therefore do not have executive departments reporting to them. Examples are Departments of Law, Finance, etc.

- The executive head of a government department, often designated as Director, Commissioner, Chief, or other title, leads the operational arm of the department, commonly referred to as the Directorate, Commissionerate, or simply the department. The executive department (also known as field department, bureau or agency) is headed by a specialist in the relevant field, who may or may not be a IAS officer. This individual is responsible for the implementation and execution of policies and programs formulated by the Secretariat. They oversee the day-to-day administration and operations of the department. Examples include the Directorate of Agriculture, Directorate of Urban Affairs, Directorate of Medical Education, Directorate of School Education, Commissionerate of Land Revenue, Commissionerate of Transport, and Commissionerate of Labour. In some cases, the head of a department may hold the title of Director General, as in the case of the Director General of Police, Director General of Fire and Rescue Services or Inspector General, such as the Inspector General of Registration. They report to the government through the concerned Secretary of the Secretariat Department.

== Judiciary ==
State High courts have jurisdiction over the whole state, but report to the Supreme Court of India, which may override the high court's judgments and rulings.

== List of Current State and Union Ministries Territory Governments ==
State	Chief Minister	Governor	Ruling party		State Alliance	Regional Alliance	National Alliance
Andhra Pradesh	N. Chandrababu Naidu	Syed Abdul Nazeer		Telugu Desam Party	Kutami	None	NDA
Arunachal Pradesh	Pema Khandu	Kaiwalya Trivikram Parnaik		Bharatiya Janata Party	NDA	NEDA	NDA
Assam	Himanta Biswa Sarma	Lakshaman Acharya		Bharatiya Janata Party	NDA	NEDA	NDA
Bihar	Samrat Choudhary	Syed Ata Hasnain		Bharatiya Janata Party	NDA	None	NDA
Chhattisgarh	Vishnu Deo Sai	Ramen Deka		Bharatiya Janata Party	NDA	None	NDA
Goa	Pramod Sawant	Ashok Gajapathi Raju		Bharatiya Janata Party	NDA	None	NDA
Gujarat	Bhupendrabhai Patel	Acharya Devvrat		Bharatiya Janata Party	NDA	None	NDA
Haryana	Nayab Singh Saini	Ashim Kumar Ghosh		Bharatiya Janata Party	NDA	None	NDA
Himachal Pradesh	Sukhvinder Singh Sukhu	Kavinder Gupta		Indian National Congress	INDIA	None	INDIA
Jharkhand	Hemant Soren	Santosh Gangwar		Jharkhand Mukti Morcha	MGB	None	INDIA
Karnataka	D. K. Shivakumar	Sudha Yadav		Indian National Congress	INDIA	None	INDIA
Keralam	V. D. Satheesan	Om Prakash Mathur		Indian National Congress	UDF	None	INDIA
Madhya Pradesh	Mohan Yadav	Mangubhai C. Patel		Bharatiya Janata Party	NDA	None	NDA
Maharashtra	Devendra Fadnavis	Jishnu Dev Varma		Bharatiya Janata Party	MY	None	NDA
Manipur	Yumnam Khemchand Singh	Ajay Kumar Bhalla		Bharatiya Janata Party	NDA	NEDA	NDA
Meghalaya	Conrad Sangma	C. H. Vijayashankar		National People's Party	MDA	NEDA	NDA
Mizoram	Lalduhoma	V. K. Singh		Zoram People's Movement	None	None	None
Nagaland	Neiphiu Rio	Nand Kishore Yadav		Naga People's Front	PDA	NEDA	NDA
Odisha	Mohan Charan Majhi	Braj Mohan Ram		Bharatiya Janata Party	NDA	None	NDA
Punjab	Bhagwant Mann	Gulab Chand Kataria		Aam Aadmi Party	None	None	None
Rajasthan	Bhajan Lal Sharma	Haribhau Bagade		Bharatiya Janata Party	NDA	None	NDA
Sikkim	Prem Singh Tamang	Dushyant Kumar Gautam		Sikkim Krantikari Morcha	NDA	NEDA	NDA
Tamil Nadu	C. Joseph Vijay	Rajendra Arlekar		Tamilaga Vettri Kazhagam	TVK+	None	INDIA
Telangana	Anumula Revanth Reddy	Shiv Pratap Shukla		Indian National Congress	INDIA	None	INDIA
Tripura	Manik Saha	N. Indrasena Reddy		Bharatiya Janata Party	NDA	NEDA	NDA
Uttar Pradesh	Yogi Adityanath	Anandiben Patel		Bharatiya Janata Party	NDA	None	NDA
Uttarakhand	Pushkar Singh Dhami	Dhal Singh Bisen		Bharatiya Janata Party	NDA	None	NDA
West Bengal	Suvendu Adhikari	R. N. Ravi		Bharatiya Janata Party	NDA	None	NDA
Union Territories Governed by dedicated governments similar to states
Union territory	Chief Minister	Lieutenant Governor	Ruling party		Local Alliance	Regional Alliance	National Alliance
National Capital Territory of Delhi	Rekha Gupta	Taranjit Singh Sandhu		Bharatiya Janata Party	NDA	None	NDA
Jammu and Kashmir	Omar Abdullah	Manoj Sinha		Jammu and Kashmir National Conference	INDIA (JKNC-led)	None	INDIA
Puducherry	N. Rangaswamy	Kuniyil Kailashnathan		All India N.R. Congress	NDA (AINRC-led)	None	NDA
Union Territories Governed by the Government of India via Lieutenant Governors
Union territory	Chief Minister	Lieutenant Governor	Ruling party		Local Alliance	Regional Alliance	National Alliance
Andaman and Nicobar Islands	NA	Dinesh Sharma	NA	NA	NA	NA	NA
Ladakh	NA	Vinai Kumar Saxena	NA	NA	NA	NA	NA
Union Territories Governed by the Government of India via Administrators
Union territory	Chief Minister	Administrator	Ruling party		Local Alliance	Regional Alliance	National Alliance
Chandigarh	NA	Gulab Chand Kataria	NA	NA	NA	NA	NA
Dadra and Nagar Haveli and Daman and Diu	NA	Praful Khoda Patel	NA	NA	NA	NA	NA
Lakshadweep	NA	Praful Khoda Patel (additional charge)	NA	NA	NA	NA	NA

== See also ==
- President's rule
- List of current Indian governors
- List of current Indian chief ministers
- List of current Indian chief justices
- Federalism in India
- Politics of India
- Elections in India
- List of Indian state legislative assembly elections
