= Concurrent List =

Part of the constitution of India

The Concurrent List or List-III (Seventh Schedule) is a list of 52 items (though the last subject is numbered 47) given in the Seventh Schedule to the Constitution of India. It includes the power to be considered by both the union and state government. The legislative section is divided into three lists: Union List, State List and Concurrent List. Unlike the federal governments of the United States, Switzerland or Australia, residual powers remain with the Union Government, as with the Canadian federal government.

Uniformity is desirable but not essential on items in the concurrent list. If any provision of a law made by the Legislature of a State is repugnant to any provision of a law made by Parliament which Parliament is competent to enact, or to any provision of an existing law with respect to one of the matters enumerated in the Concurrent List, then, the law made by Parliament, whether passed before or after the law made by the Legislature of such State, or, as the case may be, the existing law, shall prevail and the law made by the Legislature of the State shall, to the extent of the repugnancy, be void. There is an exception to this in cases "where a law is made by the Legislature of a State with respect to one of the matters enumerated in the Concurrent List contains any provision repugnant to the provisions of an earlier law made by Parliament or an existing law with respect to that matter, then, the law so made by the Legislature of such State shall, if it has been reserved for the consideration of the President and has received his assent, prevail in that State. Provided that nothing in this clause shall prevent Parliament from enacting at any time any law with respect to the same matter including a law adding to, amending, varying or repealing the law so made by the Legislature of the State."

== Items on the list ==
The 52 items currently on the list are:

1. Criminal law, including all matters included in the Indian Penal Code at the commencement of this Constitution but excluding offences against laws with respect to any of the matters specified in List I or List II and excluding the use of naval, military or air forces or any other armed forces of the Union in aid of the civil power.
2. Criminal procedure, including all matters included in the Code of Criminal Procedure at the commencement of this Constitution.
3. Preventive detention for reasons connected with the security of a State, the maintenance of public order, or the maintenance of supplies and services essential to the community; persons subjected to such detention.
4. Removal from one State to another State of prisoners, accused persons and persons subjected to preventive detention for reasons specified in Entry 3 of this list.
5. Marriage and divorce; infants and minors; adoption; wills, intestacy and succession; joint family and partition; all matters in respect of which parties in judicial proceedings were immediately before the commencement of this Constitution subject to their personal law.
6. Transfer of property other than agricultural land; registration of deeds and documents.
7. Contracts including partnership, agency, contracts of carriage, and other special forms of contracts, but not including contracts relating to agricultural land.
8. Actionable wrongs
9. Bankruptcy and insolvency.
10. Trust and Trustees.
11. Administrators – general and official trustees.
11-A. Administration of justice; constitution and Organisation of all courts, except the Supreme Court and the High Courts.***[Entry 11-A inserted by the Constitution (Forty–second Amendment) Act, 1976, s. 57 (w.e.f. 3-1-1977)]
12. Evidence and oaths; recognition of laws, public acts and records, and judicial proceedings.
13. Civil procedure, including all matters included in the Code of Civil Procedure at the commencement of this Constitution, limitation and arbitration.
14. Contempt of court, but not including contempt of the Supreme Court.
15. Vagrancy; nomadic and migratory tribes.
16. Lunacy and mental deficiency, including places for the reception or treatment of lunatics and mental deficients.
17. Prevention of cruelty to animals.
17-A. Forests.***[Entry 17-A inserted by the Constitution (Forty–second Amendment) Act, 1976, s. 57 (w.e.f. 3-1-1977)]
17-B. Protection of wild animals and birds.***[Entry 17-B inserted by the Constitution (Forty–second Amendment) Act, 1976, s. 57 (w.e.f. 3-1-1977)]
18. Adulteration of foodstuffs and other goods.
19. Drugs and poisons, subject to the provisions of Entry 59 of List I with respect to opium.
20. Economic and social planning.
20-A. Population control and family planning.***[Entry 20-A inserted by the Constitution (Forty–second Amendment) Act, 1976, s. 57 (w.e.f. 3-1-1977)]
21. Commercial and industrial monopolies, combines and trusts.
22. Trade unions; industrial and labour disputes.
23. Social security and social insurance; employment and unemployment.
24. Welfare of labour including conditions of work, provident funds, employers' liability, workmen's compensation, invalidity and old age pensions and maternity benefits.
25. Education, including technical education, medical education and universities, subject to the provisions of Entries 63, 64, 65 and 66 of List I; vocational and technical training of labour.***[Entry 25 substituted by the Constitution (Forty–second Amendment) Act, 1976, s. 57 (w.e.f. 3-1-1977)]
26. Legal, medical and other professions.
27. Relief and rehabilitation of persons displaced from their original place of residence by reason of the setting up of the Dominions of India and Pakistan.
28. Charities and charitable institutions, charitable and religious endowments and religious institutions.
29. Prevention of the extension from one State to another of infectious or contagious diseases or pests affecting men, animals or plants.
30. Vital statistics including registration of births and deaths.
31. Ports other than those declared by or under law made by Parliament or existing law to be major ports.
32. Shipping and navigation on inland waterways as regards mechanically propelled vessels, and the rule of the road on such waterways, and the carriage of passengers and goods on inland waterways subject to the provisions of List I with respect to national waterways.
33. Trade and commerce in, and the production, supply and distribution of,-

(a) the products of any industry where the control of such industry by the Union is declared by Parliament by law to be expedient in the public interest, and imported goods of the same kind as such products
(b) foodstuffs, including edible oilseeds and oils
(c) cattle fodder, including oilcakes and other concentrates
(d) raw cotton, whether ginned or not ginned, and cotton seed; and
(e) raw jute.

33-A. Weights and measures except establishment of standards.***[Entry 33-A inserted by the Constitution (Forty–second Amendment) Act, 1976, s. 57 (w.e.f. 3-1-1977)]
34. Price control.
35. Mechanically propelled vehicles including the principles on which taxes on such vehicles are to be levied.
36. Factories.
37. Boilers.
38. Electricity.
39. Newspapers, books and printing presses.
40. Archaeological sites and remains other than those declared by or under law made by Parliament to be of national importance.
41. Custody, management and disposal of property (including agricultural land) declared by law to be evacuee property.
42. Acquisition and requisitioning of property.
43. Recovery in a State of claims in respect of taxes and other public demands, including arrears of land-revenue and sums recoverable as such arrears, arising outside that State.
44. Stamp duties other than duties or fees collected by means of judicial stamps, but not including rates of stamp duty.
45. Inquiries and statistics for the purposes of any of the matters specified in List II or List III.
46. Jurisdiction and powers of all courts, except the Supreme Court, with respect to any of the matters in this List.
47. Fees in respect of any of the matters in this List, but not including fees taken in any court.

== Transferred Subjects ==
Through the 42nd Amendment Act of 1976, five subjects were transferred from State to Concurrent List. They are:

1. Education
2. Forests
3. Weights & Measures
4. Protection of Wild Animals and Birds
5. Administration of Justice

== See also ==
- Union List
- State List
- Constitution of India
- Part Eleven of the Constitution of India
- Federalism in India
