= Bennie Dover Jackson Multi-Magnet Middle School =

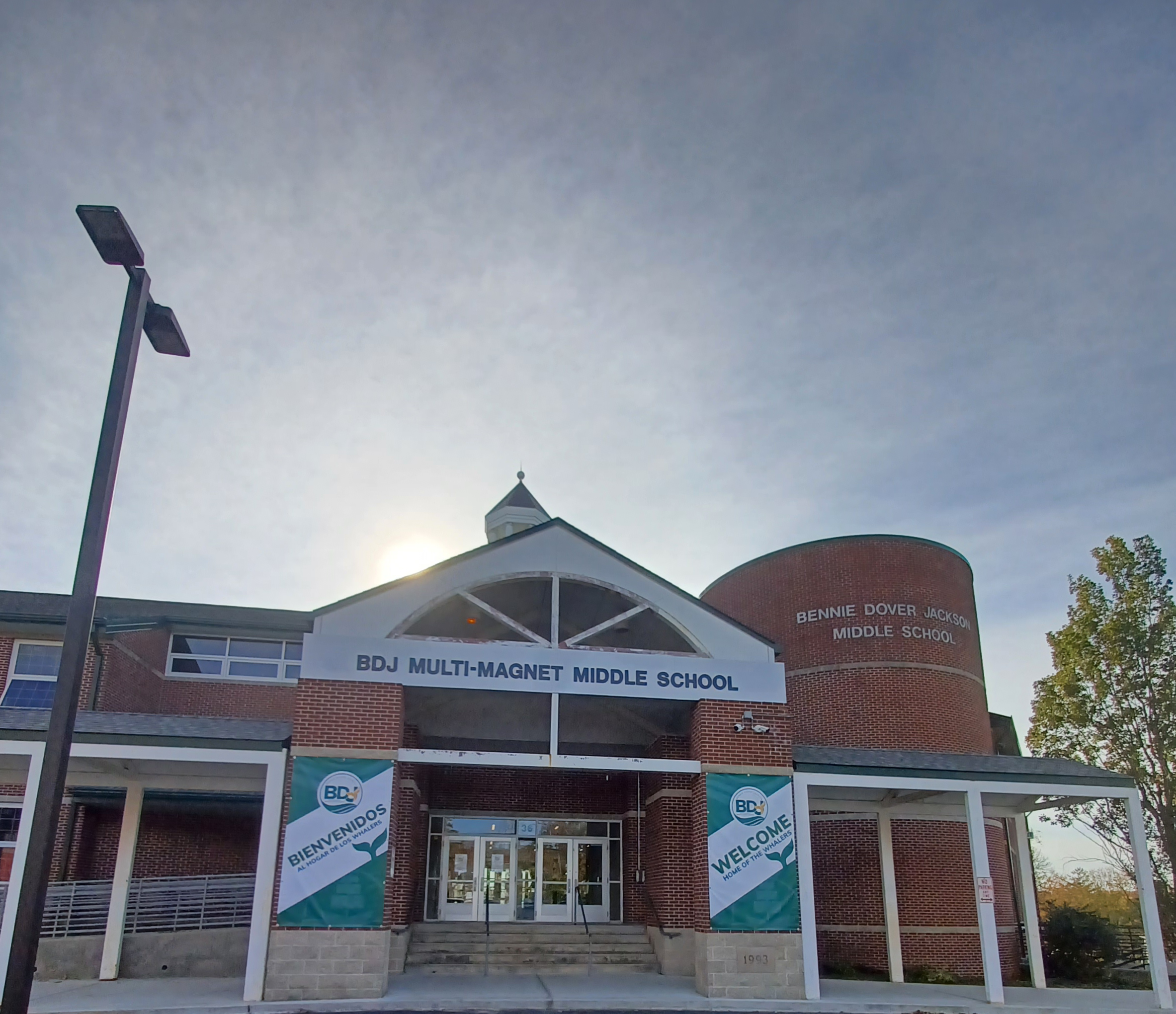

Location
- 36 Waller Street; New London, CT 06320; United States; 41.3581°N 72.1070°W

Information
- School type: Magnet School
- Opened: 1994
- School district: New London Public School District
- Principal: Chris Vamvakides
- Grades: 6-8
- Website: https://www.newlondon.org/secondary

Bennie Dover Jackson Middle School is a multi-magnet middle school in New London, CT. Bennie Dover Jackson Middle School opened in 1994. In 2022-2023, Bennie Dover Jackson Middle School served 337 students in grades 6-8. Bennie Dover Jackson Middle School was named after a local educator.

== Namesake ==
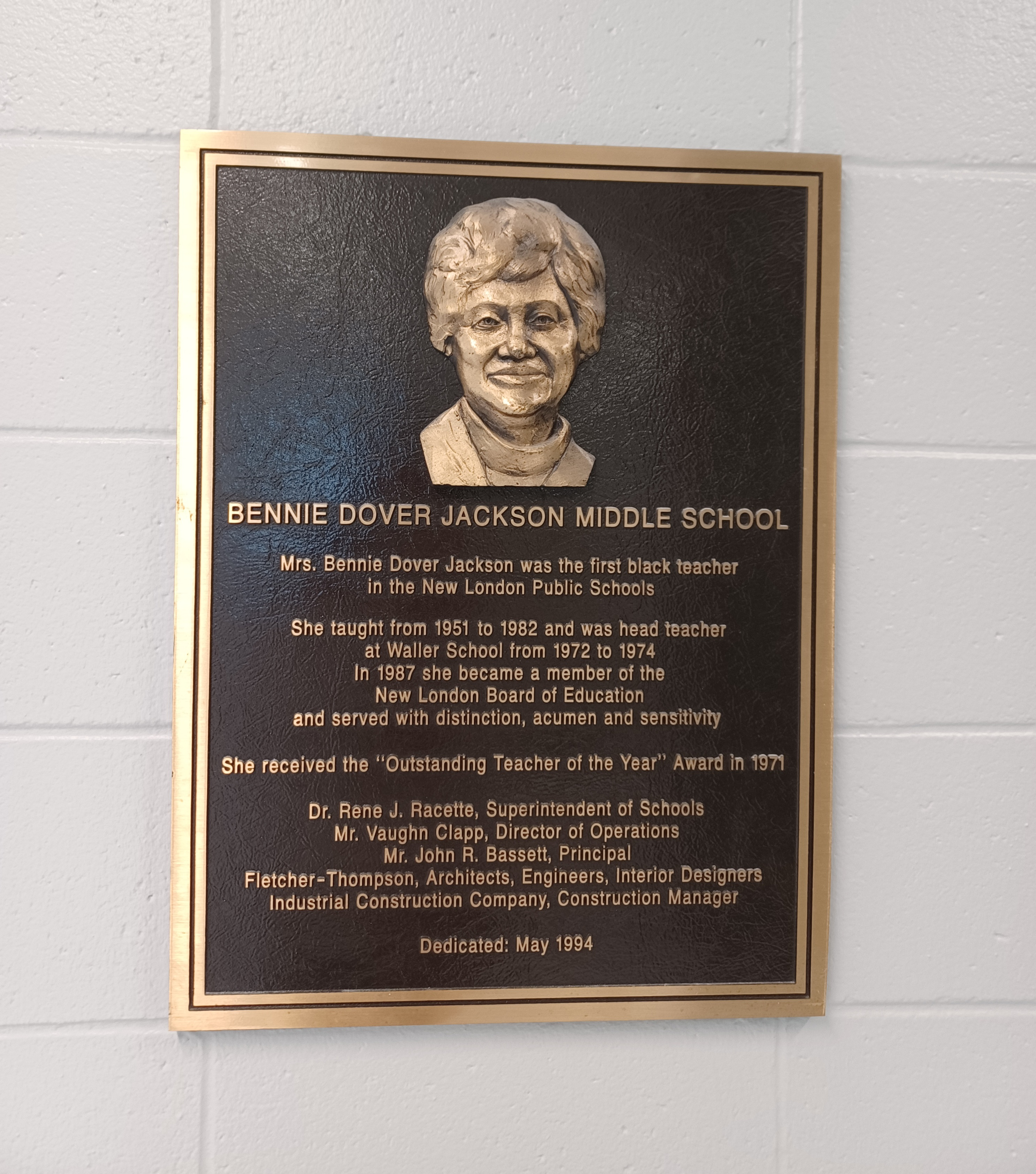
A dedication plaque in the school building

Bennie Dover Jackson was a black educator in New London, CT. Bennie Dover Jackson Middle School was named in her honor. Jackson lived from December 23, 1921 to October 30, 1988. She is believed to have been the first black school teacher in the New London Public School System. Her first teaching role in the area was at Jennings Elementary School. This began her life-long interest in education for the New London community.

=== Work in the region ===
Although Jackson was originally from South Carolina, much of her life was spent in New London, CT. She worked at several schools in the area. At Jennings Elementary School, Jackson taught 2nd grade before moving on to the Waller School, where she was a head teacher. She taught next at Winthrop Elementary. This was her final teaching role before retirement. Following her retirement, Jackson served on the New London Board of Education.

== School profile information ==
Bennie Dover Jackson Middle School is the only public middle school in New London, CT. It is a multi-magnet school, educating students who matriculate from two of the district's three public magnet elementary schools (Winthrop STEM Elementary Magnet School and C.B. Jennings International Elementary Magnet School) as well as other students accepted into the magnet system. (Students from Nathan Hale Arts Magnet School attend middle school at the New London High School campus.) The school colors are green and gold and the mascot is the Whalers.

== Enrich Mentorship Program ==
Bennie Dover Jackson Middle School has a partnership with Connecticut College. The Enrich Mentorship Program allows for college students to serve as mentors for middle school students. The college students guide participating middle school students through a variety of after-school activities at the middle school and on the Connecticut College campus. The program is seen as a community-building partnership that provides a safe space for participating middle schoolers to express themselves.

== Notable alumni ==
=== Shineika Fareus ===
Fareus is a graduate of the New London Public School District. She attended both Bennie Dover Jackson Middle School and New London High School. Fareus came to the United States, from Haiti, following the 2010 earthquake. Fareus is known for her work at Hearing Youth Voices, the Connecticut Black and Brown Student Union, and Higher Edge. Fareus is on the board of Higher Edge; Higher Edge is an organization to assist first generation college students with the college process. She is also known for her run for City Council. Although Fareus was not on the endorsed slate of candidates, she was in the primary election. A primary election occurs when enough signatures are collected to challenge the endorsed slate of candidates.
