= States Reorganisation Act, 1956 =

Indian act reforming state boundaries

Parliament of India
- Long title: An Act to provide for the reorganisation of the States of India and for matters connected therewith.
- Citation: Act No. 37 of 1956
- Enacted by: Parliament of India
- Enacted: 31 August 1956
- Effective: 1 November 1956
- Status: In force

The States Reorganisation Act, 1956 was a major reform of the boundaries of India's states and territories, organising them along linguistic lines. Although additional changes to India's state boundaries have been made since 1956, it remains the most extensive change in state boundaries since the independence of India. The Act came into effect at the same time as the Constitution (Seventh Amendment) Act, 1956, which restructured the constitutional framework for India's existing states and the requirements to pass the States Reorganisation Act, 1956 under the provisions of Part I of the Constitution of India, Article 3. (Note: Article 3 deals with the "Formation of new States and alteration of areas, boundaries or names of existing States".)

The movement reached a turning point in 1952 when Potti Sreeramulu died following a 56 day hunger strike for a separate Telugu-speaking state. His martyrdom triggered widespread unrest, forcing the Indian government to create Andhra State in 1953, the first in India established on a linguistic basis. This set a precedent for other linguistic groups, leading to the appointment of the States Reorganisation Commission (SRC) in 1953, chaired by Fazal Ali, which ultimately provided the framework for the 1956 Act.

== Background ==
=== Political integration after independence ===
Administrative divisions of India in 1951. Note that Sikkim was an Indian Protectorate until 1975.

British India, which included present-day India, Pakistan, Bangladesh and Myanmar, was divided into two types of territories: the Provinces of British India, which were governed directly by British officials responsible to the Governor-General of India; and the Indian States, under the rule of local hereditary rulers who recognised British suzerainty in return for continued authority over their own realms, in most cases as established by treaty. As a result of the reforms of the early 20th century, most of the British provinces had directly elected legislatures as well as governors, although some of the smaller provinces were governed by a chief commissioner appointed by the Governor-General. Major reforms put forward by the British in the 1930s also recognised the principle of federalism, which was carried forward into the governance of independent India.

On 15 August 1947, British India was granted independence as the separate dominions of India and Pakistan. The British dissolved their treaty relations with more than 500 princely states, who were encouraged to accede to either India or Pakistan, while under no compulsion to do so. Most of the states acceded to India, and a few to Pakistan. Bhutan, Hyderabad and Kashmir opted for independence; Bhutan remains independent, but Hyderabad was annexed by India, and the status of Kashmir became the subject of conflict between India and Pakistan.

South Indian states prior to the States Reorganisation Act

Between 1947 and about 1950, the territories of the princely states were politically integrated into the Indian Union. Several states were merged into existing provinces; others were organised into unions, such as Rajputana, Himachal Pradesh, Madhya Bharat, and Vindhya Pradesh, made up of multiple princely states; a few, including Mysore, Hyderabad, Bhopal, and Bilaspur, remained separate states. The Government of India Act 1935 remained the constitutional law of India pending adoption of a new Constitution.

The new Constitution of India, which came into force on 26 January 1950, made India a sovereign democratic republic. The new republic was also declared to be a "Union of States". The constitution of 1950 distinguished between three main types of states and a class of territories:

- Part A states – which were the former governors' provinces of British India, were ruled by a governor appointed by the president and an elected state legislature. The nine Part A states were Assam, Bihar, Bombay, Madhya Pradesh (formerly Central Provinces and Berar), Madras, Odisha (formerly Orissa), Punjab (formerly East Punjab), Uttar Pradesh (formerly the United Provinces), and West Bengal.
- Part B states – which were former princely states or unions of princely states, governed by a rajpramukh, who was usually the ruler of a constituent state, and an elected legislature. The raj Pramukh was appointed by the President of India. The eight Part B states were Hyderabad, Jammu and Kashmir, Madhya Bharat, Mysore, Patiala and East Punjab States Union (PEPSU), Rajasthan, Saurashtra, and Travancore-Cochin.
- Part C states – included both the former chief commissioners' provinces and some princely states, and each was governed by a chief commissioner appointed by the President of India. The ten Part C states were Ajmer, Bhopal, Bilaspur, Coorg, Cutch, Delhi, Himachal Pradesh, Manipur, Tripura, and Vindhya Pradesh.
- The sole Part D territory – was the Andaman and Nicobar Islands, which was administered by a lieutenant governor appointed by the central government.

In these classifications, Part A states had a Governor, Part B states had a Rajpramukh and Part C states had a commissioner.

=== Movement for linguistic states ===
The demand for states to be organised on a linguistic basis was developed even before India achieved independence from British rule. The first linguistic movement started in 1886, in what is now Odisha. The movement gained momentum in later years with the demand for a separate Orissa Province to be formed by bifurcating the existing Bihar and Orissa Province. Due to the efforts of Madhusudan Das, the Father of Odia nationalism, the movement eventually achieved its objective in 1936, when Orissa Province became the first Indian state (pre-independence) to be organised on the basis of common languages.

The post-independence period saw the ascent of political movements for the creation of new states developed on linguistic lines. The movement to create a Telugu-speaking state out of the northern portion of Madras State gathered strength in the years after independence, and in 1953, the sixteen northern Telugu-speaking districts of Madras State became the new State of Andhra.

During the 1950–1956 period, other small changes were made to state boundaries: the small state of Bilaspur was merged with Himachal Pradesh on 1 July 1954; and Chandernagore, a former enclave of French India, was incorporated into West Bengal in 1955.

=== States Reorganisation Commission ===
The States Reorganisation Commission was preceded by the Linguistic Provinces Commission (also called the Dhar Commission), which was set up in June 1948. It rejected language as a parameter for dividing states. Later, Prime Minister Jawaharlal Nehru appointed the States Reorganisation Commission in December 1953, with the remit to reorganise the Indian states. The new commission was headed by the retired Chief Justice of the Supreme Court, Fazal Ali; its other two members were H. N. Kunzru and K. M. Panikkar. The efforts of the commission were overseen by Govind Ballabh Pant, who served as the Home Minister from December 1954.

The States Reorganisation Commission submitted a report on 30 September 1955, with recommendations for the reorganisation of India's states, which was then debated by the Indian parliament. Subsequently, bills were passed to make changes to the constitution and to administer the reorganisation of the states.

Political map of India, 1956, after the States Reorganisation Act, 1956

=== Related changes by other legislation ===
The States Reorganisation Act was enacted on 31 August 1956. Before it came into effect on 1 November, an important amendment was made to the Constitution of India. Under the Seventh Amendment, the existing terminology of Part A, Part B, Part C, and Part D states was altered. The distinction between Part A and Part B states was removed, becoming known simply as "states". A new type of entity, the Union Territory, replaced the classification as a Part C or Part D state.

A further Act also came into effect on 1 November 1956, transferring certain territories from Bihar to West Bengal.

== Effect of the changes ==
The States Reorganisation Act of 1956 provided for territorial reorganisation of India. The Seventh Amendment of the Constitution of India divided India into States and Union Territories. Both of the above legislation came into effect on the same date. The following list sets out the states and union territories of India as reorganised on 1 November 1956:

=== States ===
1. Andhra Pradesh (1956–2014): formed by the merger of Andhra State with the Telugu-speaking areas of Hyderabad State.
2. Assam: No change of boundary in 1956.
3. Bihar: reduced slightly by the transfer of minor territories to West Bengal (Purulia from Manbhum District, Islampur from Purnea district).
4. Bombay State: the state was enlarged by the addition of Saurashtra State and Kutch State, the Marathi-speaking districts of Berar Division and Nagpur Division of Central Province and Berar and Aurangabad Division of Hyderabad State. The southernmost districts of the Bombay Presidency were transferred to Mysore State.
5. Jammu and Kashmir: No change of boundary in 1956.
6. Kerala: formed by the merger of Travancore-Cochin state with the Malabar district and Kasaragod taluk of South Canara district of the Madras Presidency. The southern part of Travancore-Cochin, Kanyakumari district, along with Sengottai Taluk, was transferred to Madras State. The Laccadive and Minicoy Islands were separated from Malabar District to form a new Union Territory namely Laccadive, Amindivi, and Minicoy Islands.
7. Madhya Pradesh: Madhya Bharat, Vindhya Pradesh, and Bhopal State were merged into Madhya Pradesh; the Marathi-speaking districts of Nagpur Division were transferred to Bombay State.
8. Madras State: Malabar District was transferred to the new state of Kerala, South Canara district was bifurcated and transferred to Mysore State and to Kerala and a new Union Territory, Laccadive, Minicoy and Amindivi Islands, was created. The southern part of Travancore-Cochin - Kanyakumari district, along with Sengottai Taluk was added to Madras State.
9. Mysore State: enlarged by the addition of Coorg State and the Kannada speaking districts from western Madras Presidency, southern Bombay Presidency and western Hyderabad State.
10. Orissa: No change of boundary in 1956.
11. Punjab: enlarged by the addition of the Patiala and East Punjab States Union.
12. Rajasthan: enlarged by the addition of Ajmer state and parts of Bombay and Madhya Bharat states.
13. Uttar Pradesh: No change of boundary in 1956.
14. West Bengal: enlarged by the addition of Purulia district, previously part of Bihar.

=== Union territories ===
The Part C and Part D territories that were not merged into other states were converted into Union Territories by Seventh Amendment of the Constitution of India:

1. Andaman and Nicobar Islands
2. Delhi
3. Manipur
4. Tripura
5. Himachal Pradesh
6. Laccadive, Minicoy & Amindivi Islands

== Later changes ==
- Punjab Reorganisation Act, 1966 (by Indira Gandhi)
- State of Himachal Pradesh Act, 1970 (by Indira Gandhi)
- North-Eastern Areas (Reorganisation) Act, 1971 (by Indira Gandhi)
- Bihar Reorganisation Act, 2000 (by Atal Bihari Vajpayee)
- Madhya Pradesh Reorganisation Act, 2000 (by Atal Bihari Vajpayee)
- Uttar Pradesh Reorganisation Act, 2000 (by Atal Bihari Vajpayee)
- Andhra Pradesh Reorganisation Act, 2014 (by Manmohan Singh)
- Jammu and Kashmir Reorganisation Act, 2019 (by Narendra Modi)

== See also ==
- Partition of India
- Political integration of India
- Constitution of India
- Administrative divisions of India
- States and union territories of India
- Proposed states and union territories of India
- Unification of Karnataka
- Seventh Amendment of the Constitution of India
