= Seventh Amendment of the Constitution of India =

The Constitution (Seventh Amendment) Act, 1956
- India's Administrative Divisions after 7th Amendment and the States Reorganisation Act, 1956

Parliament of India
- Long title: An Act further to amend the Constitution of India.
- Citation: 7th Amendment
- Territorial extent: India
- Passed by: Lok Sabha
- Passed: 1956
- Passed by: Rajya Sabha
- Passed: 1956
- Assented to: 1956
- Signed by: Rajendra Prasad
- Commenced: 1 November 1956

Legislative history

Initiating chamber: Lok Sabha
- Bill title: The Constitution (Ninth Amendment) Bill, 1956
- Introduced: 1956
- Status: In force

The Seventh Amendment of the Constitution of India, officially known as The Constitution (Seventh Amendment) Act, 1956 made numerous amendments to the Indian Constitution in order to implement the scheme of reorganisation of States.

It came into effect on 1 November 1956 along with the States Reorganisation Act, 1956. The Seventh Amendment did away with the four-fold classification of States that existed since 1950 and introduced the concept of States and Union Territories. Constitutionally, the Princely States were not part of British India nor were their inhabitants British subjects. It also made changes related to representation in Lok Sabha and allocation of seats in the Rajya Sabha.

== Background ==
During the British Raj, India consisted of British-administered provinces, governed directly by the Governor-General of India, and Princely States, which enjoyed internal autonomy but were ultimately under British paramountcy. Constitutionally, the Princely States were not part of British India nor were their inhabitants British subjects. The territorial boundaries of these regions were shaped by historical events, treaties, and administrative convenience, often disregarding linguistic, cultural, or regional identities.

Even before independence, there were demands from various parts of the country to reorganize regions based on linguistic lines. This growing demand culminated in the formation of the States Reorganization Commission (SRC) in 1953, which was tasked with examining the feasibility of reorganizing states based on linguistic and cultural considerations while maintaining administrative efficiency and national unity.

The SRC's recommendations, presented in 1955, provided a comprehensive blueprint for reorganizing India's states and territories. The recommendations were implemented through the States Reorganization Act of 1956, which was accompanied by the 7th Constitutional Amendment. This amendment brought about significant changes to the structure of India's states and their governance, streamlining the country's administrative divisions in line with the recommendations of the SRC.

The amendment also aimed to address the anomalies in the classification of states (Part A, Part B, and Part C states), integrating them into a more uniform structure to ensure better administration and representation.

== Major Provisions ==
Article 1 of the Constitution was amended to remove provisions related to earlier four-fold classification of States.

Section 2 of the Act reads:

In Article 1 of the Constitution,- (a) for clause (2), the following clause shall be substituted, namely:- "(2) The States and the territories thereof shall be as specified in the First Schedule."; and (b) in clause (3), for sub-clause (b), the following sub-clause shall be substituted, namely:-

"(b) the Union territories specified in the First Schedule;...

Schedule I of the Constitution was amended to provide for the new Scheme of States and Union Territories.

Articles 81 and 82, that had provisions related to representation in House of People, were substituted with new Articles altogether. The new Article 81 provided for an additional 20 members in Lok Sabha as representatives of Union Territories. It also provided for new scheme of allocation of Seats to different States and territorial constituencies within the different States. Additionally, the new Article 82 provided for readjustment of said constituencies after each Census.

Amendments were made to Seventh Schedule related to acquisition of property and "ancient and historical monuments and records, and archaeological sites and remains".

Changes were made to the verbiage and terms used in several articles to account for the new States and Union Territories scheme and for removal of difficulties. Section 29 of the Amendment provided for the same.

== Result ==
India's Administrative Divisions in 1951

India's Administrative Divisions after 7th Amendment and the States Reorganization Act, 1956

== See also ==
- List of amendments of the Constitution of India
- States Reorganisation Act, 1956
