= Signe Margaret Stuart =

American artist (born 1937)

- Born: 1937 (age 88–89); New London, Connecticut
- Education: University of Connecticut; University of New Mexico
- Known for: Paintings
- Movement: Abstract

Signe Margaret Stuart (née Nelson) (born December 3, 1937) is an American artist best known for her abstract paintings and works on paper that are informed by Minimalism, quantum physics and the study of consciousness.

== Early life and education ==
Signe Stuart is a first generation Swedish American, her parents, Anna L. and Carl E. Nelson from Varmland and Halland provinces in Sweden.

Stuart was born in New London, Connecticut and spent her early life in rural Flanders, Connecticut. She was valedictorian at New London High School in 1955. She continued her studies and graduated with a B.A. degree summa cum laude, University Scholar, and Phi Beta Kappa at the University of Connecticut, 1959; Yale Norfolk Summer Arts School, 1959; M.A., painting and art history, University of New Mexico, 1961.

Early mentors included artists: Yngve Edward Soderberg, Cynthia Reeves Snow, Walter Meigs, Bernard Chaet and Lez Haas.

== Career ==
Stuart's work with sewn and acrylic stained canvasses began in the early 1960s, constructed works on paper in the 1980s, and scroll paintings in 2000. While focusing on these three bodies of work she expanded concepts and expressive forms in explorations of recycled glass, found and fabricated vacuuforms and collaged Tyvek. The latter resulted in large temporary walk-through installations - InSilence 1 and 2.

In 1971, she joined the visual arts faculty at South Dakota State University, (Brookings, SD) where she taught until her retirement in 1994 as professor emerita. She was a visiting artist at Williams College, MA, Kansas State University, Moorhead State University, MN, Connecticut College, West Texas State University, Ucross Foundation Residency, WY, and Cowles Visiting Artist at Grinnell College, IA. In 1994, she moved to Santa Fe, NM.

James Yood said of Stuart's South Dakota years: “The space of nature began to loom larger and larger in Stuart’s work as her time in South Dakota advanced, and it is not too much to see in her work of the 1980s some of the expanse of the Great Plains, the grand sweep of a panoply of nature.”

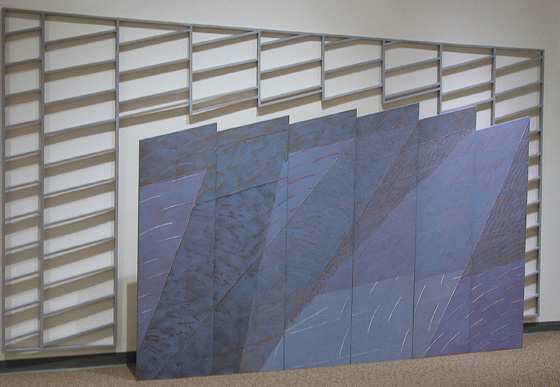
Breakaway 1, 1987, mixed media on sewn canvas and wood, 90 by 170 inches, Author photograph.

In addition to nature, Stuart found inspiration in other art forms, particularly Japanese art. “Many of her paper-based works use traditional Chinese and Japanese materials, such as mulberry and unryu paper and sumi ink. … The prominence of negative space in Stuart’s art … also echoes Asian aesthetics’ allusion to the void, the emptiness which contains all and carries as much meaning as painted or constructed surfaces.”

From 1989 to 2014, Stuart created several room size installations incorporating sound, light, and sensors, utilizing industrial materials of Styrofoam, Tyvek, and vacuuforms. These environments focused on diverse connective systems and cultural interventions in nature.

Onomatopoeia, one of Stuart’s 60-foot-wide abstract narrative scroll paintings was the subject of a chamber music composition by composer, Jonathan Chenette (Vassar College, Poughkeepsie, NY). Onomatopoeia premiered with a performance at the Albuquerque Museum of Art and History in 2010 in conjunction with the exhibition Crossing Boundaries: Synesthesia in American Art.

During her career, Stuart has been the recipient of a National Endowment for the Arts Painting Fellowship (1976), two National Endowment for the Arts mural commissions (1977 and 1985), a South Dakota Arts Council Artist Fellowship (1986) and a New Mexico Experimental Glass Workshop Fellowship (2012). Art critics and gallery directors place Stuart’s work in a broad context beyond the geographic residency of her career. “She emphasizes continuity, endlessness, surge, and strives for a broader concept of form through a-compositional devices and a tough, sometimes subliminal, and always subsidiary use of color,” Jan van der Marck observed in artscanada.

Laurel Reuter, Director, North Dakota Museum of Art, felt Stuart became known “for her superb instinct for color, for her predilection for sparseness, and for her painted constructions of canvas and paper, both large and small. … Hers is a work of connections. It also suggests that here is an artist whose most recent painting is underpinned by everything she ever knew.”

Donald Doe, curator, patient process 2001 exhibition at Grinnell College Museum writes, “For Stuart, who reads on topics ranging from the process of evolution to sub-atomic motion, her real enterprise seems a process of exploration that is not easily made verbal, a way, she says, of offering a “meta language that uncovers the nature of materials.”

Jan Adlmann placed the artist in distinguished company. "Stuart's resolutely non-objective, mesmerizing paintings on stitched canvas have long been admired in Santa Fe. Her work and, before that, the work of [Georgia] O'Keeffe, Agnes Martin, and Florence Pierce ... have raised the bar of serious art in this city ..."

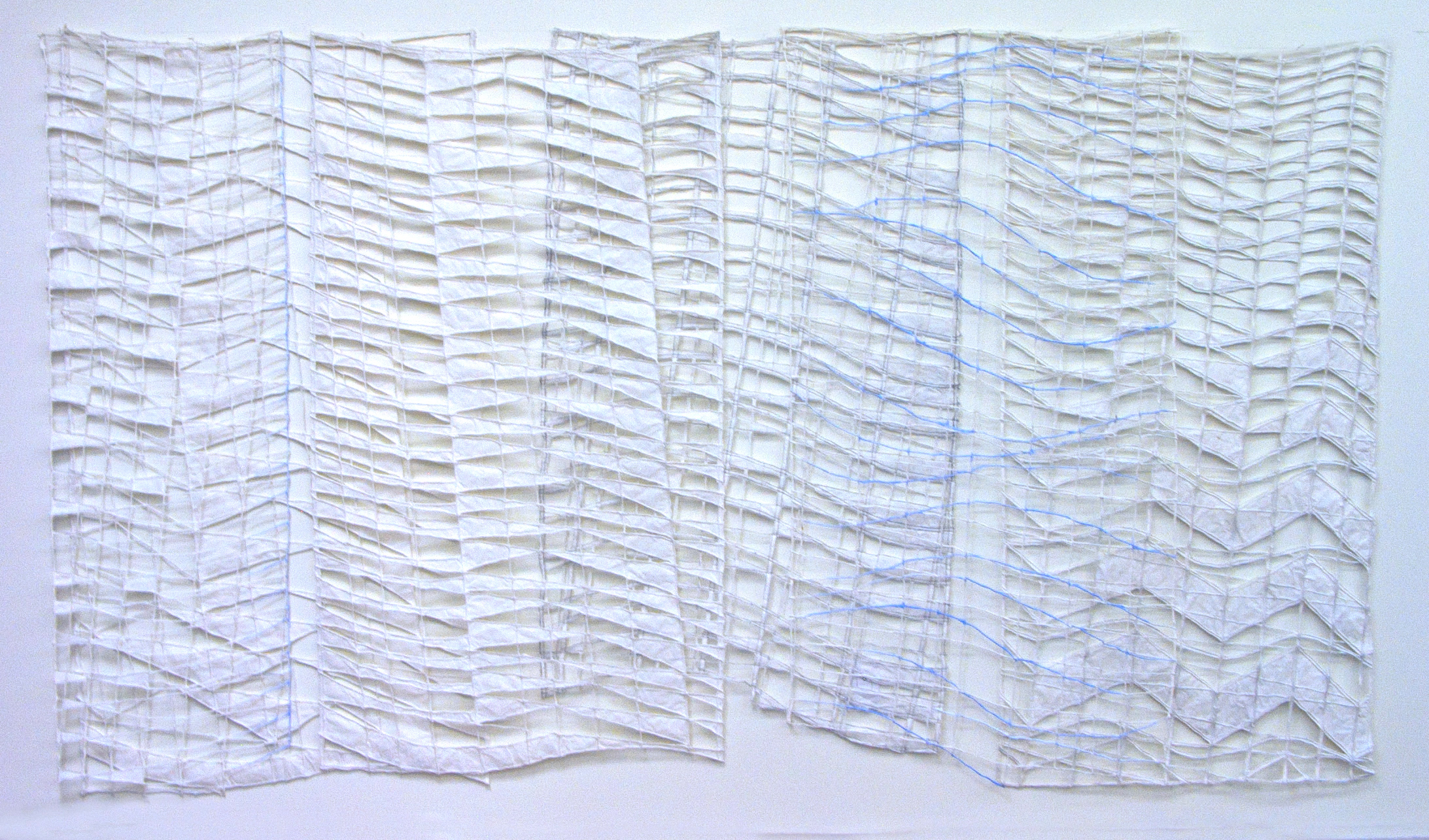
Flux Wall 2, 2019, acrylic and graphite on cut mulberry paper, 68 by 115 inches, Author photograph.

== Works ==
=== Main exhibitions and artworks ===
Over 100 juried and invitational art exhibitions, mainly in the middle west and southwest regions of the United States. Solo museum exhibitions include: Sheldon Art Museum, Lincoln, NE; North Dakota Museum of Art, Grand Forks, ND; Plains Museum, Fargo, ND; American Swedish Institute, Minneapolis, MN; South Dakota Art Museum (retrospective exhibition 1995), Brookings, SD; Sioux Falls Civic Fine Arts Center, SD; Montgomery Museum of Art, AL; and the Roswell Museum and Art Center, Roswell, NM. Solo gallery shows include: Jan Cicero, Chicago; Peter M. David, Minneapolis, MN; Anderson/O’Brien, Omaha, NE; and William Siegal, Santa Fe, NM.

=== Public collections ===
- Aberdeen Convention Center, SD. Commission
- American Swedish Institute, Minneapolis, MN
- Benton Museum of Art, Storrs, CT
- Blanden Art Museum, Fort Dodge, IA
- Boise Art Museum, ID
- Cedar Rapids Public Library, IA. Commission
- College of Idaho, Caldwell, ID
- Dahl Art Center, Rapid City, SD
- Federal Reserve Bank, Minneapolis, MN
- Grinnell College, IA
- Jonson Gallery, Albuquerque, NM
- Joslyn Art Museum, Omaha, NE
- New Mexico Museum of Art, Santa Fe, NM
- New Mexico State Capitol Art Foundation, Santa Fe, NM
- North Dakota Museum of Arts, Grand Forks, ND
- Plains Art Museum, Fargo, ND
- Roswell Museum and Art Center, NM
- Salt Lake City Public Library, UT
- Schnitzer Museum of Art, Eugene, OR
- Sheldon Museum of Art, Lincoln, NE
- South Dakota Art Museum, Brookings, SD
- South Dakota State University, Brookings, SD
- Southwest Minnesota State University Museum, Marshall, MN
- Tacoma Art Museum, WA
- University of Mexico Museum of Art, Albuquerque, NM
- Utah Museum of Fine Arts, Salt Lake City, UT
- Washington Pavilion, Sioux Falls, SD

=== Corporate collections ===
- 3 M Company, MN
- Citibank, Sioux Falls, SD
- Hawthorne Realty Co, Chicago, IL
- Hilton Hotel, Chicago, IL
- Honeywell, Minneapolis, MN
- IBM, Raleigh, NC
- Kutak, Rock, and Campbell, Omaha, NE
- Miami Airport, FL
- RORER Group, Fort Washington, PA
- St. Paul Co., MN
- Sioux Falls Airport, SD
- Waverly Hotel, Atlanta, GA

== Personal ==
She was married to Joseph Martin Stuart (1932–2016) in 1960. He was an artist and museum director. Together they had one daughter.

She established the Stuart Artist-in-Residency Program at South Dakota State University in 2014.

== Exhibit catalogs ==
- Art for a New Century. Brookings: South Dakota Art Museum. 1990.
- Midlands Invitational 1990: Paintings and Sculpture. Omaha, NE: Joslyn Art Museum. 1989.
- patient process, February 3 – April 15, 2001. IA: Faulconer Gallery, Grinnell College. 2001.
- Romantic Materialism: Signe Stuart, Jesse Small, and Brandon Reese, July 11 – August 30, 2008. Oklahoma City: [ArtSpace]. 2008.
- Signe Stuart, April 29 – June 4, 1989. Sioux Falls, SD: Civic Fine Arts Center. 1989.
- Signe Stuart Fifteen, October 2, 2015 – March 20, 2016. NM: Roswell Museum and Art Center. 2016.
- Signe Stuart Retrospective, March 4 – April 23, 1995. Brookings: South Dakota Art Museum. 1995.
- South Dakota Selects, September 1 – October 17, 1988. Rapid City, SD: Dahl Fine Arts Center. 1988.
- XHIBIT, Exhibition 6, November 11, 2011 – February 25, 2012. Mesilla, NM: Preston Contemporary Art Center. 2012.
