= Jose B. Gonzalez =

American poet

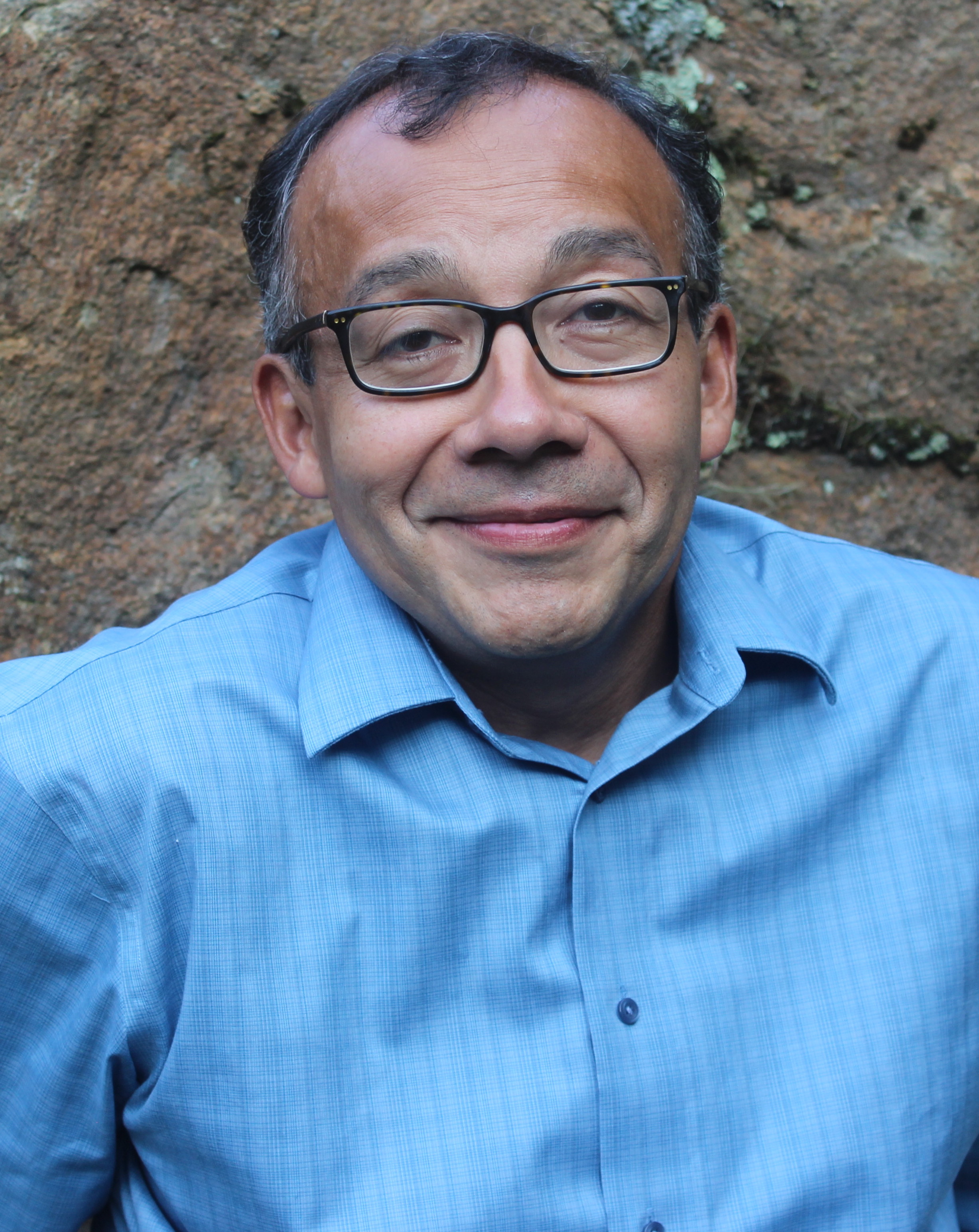
- Born: San Salvador, El Salvador
- Occupations: Poet, Educator, Featured Speaker
- Writing career
- Genre: Poetry
- Website: josebgonzalez.com

Jose B. Gonzalez is the state of Connecticut Poet Laureate as well as a Latino poet and educator.

Gonzalez authored the poetry collections, Toys Made of Rock (Bilingual Review Press, 2015), and When Love Was Reels (Arte Public Press, 2017), and with John S. Christie, served as Co-Editor of Latino Boom: An Anthology of U.S. Latino Literature. He was born in San Salvador, El Salvador in 1967, where he lived until he was eight. After his father and then his mother migrated to the U.S., he rejoined his family when he migrated to New London, Connecticut in 1976.

A photograph of him as a child in El Salvador and lines from his poetry are featured in the Smithsonian National Museum of American History. He has appeared as a guest poet on Univision and American Latino TV and has been a contributor to Hispanic Outlook in Higher Education and National Public Radio (NPR). He has also been featured in CBS New Radio and has been a featured storyteller in The Moth.

His poetry has been published in such journals as Quercus Review, Callaloo, The Teacher's Voice, Palabra, Acentos Review, and Colere, and anthologies including the Norton Anthology of American Literature, Coloring Book, Nantucket: A Collection, and Latino Boom: An Anthology of U.S. Latino Literature, and Ocho. A recording of him reading his poetry is archived in the Library of Congress Palabra Archive that also features such authors as Gabriel García Márquez, Gabriela Mistral, Pablo Neruda, and Jorge Luis Borges. He founded LatinoStories.com.

He is a graduate of New London High School, and holds a Bachelor of Science from Bryant University, a Master's in Teaching English from Brown University, and a Ph.D. in English from the University of Rhode Island. He is a professor of English at the United States Coast Guard Academy in New London, Connecticut.

== Awards ==
He is the recipient of the following awards:

- 2003 National Association of Multicultural Education CT Faculty of the Year
- 2006 NEATE Poet of the Year
- 2009 American Association of Hispanics in Higher Education (AAHHE) Outstanding Latino Faculty of the Year
- 2011-2012 Fulbright Scholar
- 2015 Latino De Oro (Arts and Culture)
- 2015 International Latino Book Award Finalist
- 2018 Connecticut Book Award Finalist (Poetry) for When Love Was Reels
- 2019 Connecticut Department of Economic and Community Development Artistic Excellence Fellowship

== Works ==
=== Poetry collections ===
- Toys Made of Rock. Bilingual Review Press. 2015. ISBN 978-1-939743-15-2.
- When Love Was Reels. Arte Publico. 2017. ISBN 978-1558858503.

=== Editor ===
- Latino Boom An Anthology of U.S. Latino Literature. Pearson (John S. Christie, co-editor). 2006. ISBN 9780321093837.

=== Poems in Anthologies ===
- Connecticut Literary Anthology edited by Jotham Burrello. Elephant Rock Productions. 2020. ISBN 978-1732414143.
- The Norton Introduction to Literature (12th ed.) edited by Kelly J. Mays. Norton. 2016. ISBN 978-1-939743-15-2.
- Theatre Under My Skin, Contemporary Salvadoran Poetry Edited by Alexandra Rytton Regaled and Tania Pleitez. Kalina. 2016. 2014. ISBN 978-9992387672.
- Bullying: Replies, Rebuttals, Confessions, and Catharsis: A Multigenerational and Multicultural Anthology Edited by María Luisa Arroyo and Magdalena Gómez. Skyhorse. 2012. ISBN 978-1616087272.
- Coloring Book: An Eclectic Anthology of Fiction and Poetry by Multicultural Writers edited by boice-Terrel Adams. Rattlecat. 2003. ISBN 0970134037.

== Speaking career ==
Gonzalez has been a featured speaker throughout the country including at Fairfield University, Rutgers University Pittsburg State University (Kansas), Del Mar College (Corpus Christi, Texas), Cornell University Connecticut College, The Smithsonian Museum of the American Indian in Washington DC, at festivals such as the Newburyport Literary Festival, and the Sunken Garden Poetry Festival. He has presented his poetry in countries such as El Salvador and Spain.
