= State List =

Part of the Constitution of India

The State List or List-II is a list of 61 items. Initially there were 66 items in the list in Schedule Seven to the Constitution of India. The legislative section is divided into three lists: the Union List, the State List and the Concurrent List. Unlike the federal governments of the United States, Switzerland or Australia, residual powers remain with the Union Government, as with the Canadian federal government.

If any provision of a law made by the Legislature of State is repugnant to any provision of a law made by Parliament which Parliament is competent to enact, or to any provision of an existing law with respect to one of the matters enumerated in the Concurrent List, then, the law made by Parliament, whether passed before or after the law made by the Legislature of such State, or, as the case may be, the existing law, shall prevail and the law made by the Legislature of the State shall, to the extent of the repugnancy, be void. There is an exception to this in cases "where a law made by the Legislature of a State with respect to one of the matters enumerated in the Concurrent List contains any provision repugnant to the provisions of an earlier law made by Parliament or an existing law with respect to that matter, then, the law so made by the Legislature of such State shall, if it has been reserved for the consideration of the President and has received his assent, prevail in that State. Provided that nothing in this clause shall prevent Parliament from enacting at any time any law with respect to the same matter including a law adding to, amending, varying or repealing the law so made by the Legislature of the State."

== Items on the list ==
The 59 items currently on the list are:

1. Public order (but not including the use of any naval, military or air force or any other armed force of the Union or of any other force subject to the control of the Union or of any contingent or unit thereof in aid of the civil power).
2. Police (including railway and village police) subject to the provisions of Entry 2-A of Union List
3. Officers and servants of the High Court; procedure in rent and revenue courts; fees taken in all courts except the Supreme Court.
4. Prisons, reformatories, Borstal institutions and other institutions of a like nature and persons detained therein; arrangements with other States for the use of prisons and other institutions.
5. Local government, that is to say, the constitution and powers of municipal corporations, improvement trusts, district boards, mining settlement authorities and other local authorities for the purpose of local self-government or village administration.
6. Public health and sanitation; hospitals and dispensaries.
7. Pilgrimages, other than pilgrimages to places outside India.
8. Intoxicating liquors, that is to say, the production, manufacture, transport, purchase and sale of intoxicating liquors.
9. Relief for the disabled and unemployable.
10. Burials and burial grounds; cremations and cremation grounds
11. ~~Education including universities, subject to the provisions of entries 63, 64, 65 and 66 of List I and entry 25 of List III.~~***[Entry 11 omitted by the Constitution (Forty-second Amendment) Act, 1976, s. 57 (w.e.f. 3-1-1977)]
12. Libraries, museums and other similar institutions controlled or financed by the State; ancient and historical monuments and records other than those declared by or under law made by Parliament to be of national importance.
13. Communications, that is to say, roads, bridges, ferries, and other means of communication not specified in List I; municipal tramways, ropeways, inland waterways and traffic thereon subject to the provisions of List I and List III with regard to such water-ways; vehicles other than mechanically propelled vehicles.
14. Agriculture, including agricultural education and research; protection against pests and prevention of plant diseases.
15. Preservation, protection and improvement of stock and prevention of animal diseases; veterinary training and practice.
16. Ponds and the prevention of cattle trespass.
17. Water, that is to say, water supplies, irrigation and canals, drainage and embankments, water storage and water power subject to the provisions of Entry 56 of List I.
18. Land, that is to say, rights in or over land, land tenures including the relation of landlord and tenant, and the collection of rents; transfer and alienation of agricultural land; land improvement and agricultural loans; colonization.
19. ~~Forests.~~***[Entry 19 omitted by the Constitution (Forty-second Amendment) Act, 1976, s. 57 (w.e.f. 3-1-1977)]
20. ~~Protection of wild animals and birds.~~***[Entry 20 omitted by the Constitution (Forty-second Amendment) Act, 1976, s. 57 (w.e.f. 3-1-1977)]
21. Fisheries.
22. Courts of wards; subject to the provisions of Entry 34 of List I; encumbered and attached estates.
23. Regulation of mines and mineral development subject to the provisions of List I with respect to regulation and development under the control of the Union.
24. Industries subject to the provisions of Entries 7 and 52 of List I.
25. Gas and gas-works.
26. Trade and commerce within the State subject to the provisions of Entry 33 of List III.
27. Production, supply and distribution of goods subject to the provisions of Entry 33 of List III.
28. Markets and fairs.
29. ~~Weights and measures except establishment of standards.~~***[Entry 29 omitted by the Constitution (Forty-second Amendment) Act, 1976, s. 57 (w.e.f. 3-1-1977)]
30. Money-lending and money-lenders; relief of agricultural indebtedness.
31. Inns and inn-keepers.
32. Incorporation, regulation and winding up of corporations, other than those specified in List I, and universities; unincorporated trading, literary, scientific, religious and other societies and associations; co-operative societies.
33. Theatres and dramatic performances; cinemas subject to the provisions of Entry 60 of List I; sports, entertainments and amusements.
34. Betting and gambling.
35. Works, lands and buildings vested in or in the possession of the State.
36. ~~Acquisition or requisitioning of property, except for the purposes of the Union, subject to the provisions of entry 42 of List III~~~~.~~***[Entry 36 omitted by the Constitution (Seventh Amendment) Act, 1956, s. 26 (w.e.f. 1-11-1956)]
37. Elections to the Legislature of the State subject to the provisions of any law made by Parliament.
38. Salaries and allowances of members of the legislature of the State, of the Speaker and Deputy Speaker of the Legislative Assembly and, if there is a Legislative Council, of the Chairman and Deputy Chairman thereof.
39. Powers, privileges and immunities of the Legislative Assembly and of the members and the committees thereof and, if there is a Legislative Council, of that Council and of the members and the committees thereof; enforcement of attendance of persons for giving evidence or producing documents before committees of the Legislature of the State.
40. Salaries and allowances of Ministers for the State.
41. State public services; State Public Service Commission.
42. State pensions, that is to say, pensions payable by the State or out of the Consolidated Fund of the State.
43. Public debt of the State.
44. Treasure trove.
45. Land revenue, including the assessment and collection of revenue, the maintenance of land records, survey for revenue purposes and records of rights, and alienation of revenues.
46. Taxes on agricultural income.
47. Duties in respect of succession to agricultural land.
48. Estate duty in respect of agricultural land.
49. Taxes on lands and buildings.
50. Taxes on mineral rights subject to any limitations imposed by Parliament by law relating to mineral development.
51. Duties of excise on the following goods manufactured or produced in the State and countervailing duties at the same or lower rates on similar goods manufactured or produced elsewhere in India -
  (a) alcoholic liquors for human consumption
  (b) opium, Indian hemp and other narcotic drugs and narcotics
  but not including medicinal and toilet preparations containing alcohol or any substance included in sub-paragraph (b) of this entry.
52. ~~Taxes on the entry of goods into a local area for consumption, use or sale therein.~~***[Entry 52 omitted by the Constitution (One Hundred and First Amendment) Act, 2016, s. 17(b)(i) (w.e.f. 16-9-2016)]
53. Taxes on the consumption or sale of electricity.
54. Taxes on the sale of petroleum crude, high speed diesel, motor spirit (commonly known as petrol), natural gas, aviation turbine fuel and alcoholic liquor for human consumption, but not including sale in the course of inter-State trade or commerce or sale in the course of international trade or commerce of such goods.(Subs.)
55. ~~Taxes on advertisements other than advertisements published in the newspapers [and advertisements broadcast by radio or television].~~***[Entry 55 omitted by the Constitution (One Hundred and First Amendment) Act, 2016, s. 17(b)(iii) (w.e.f. 16-9-2016)]
56. Taxes on goods and passengers carried by road or on inland waterways.
57. Taxes on vehicles, whether mechanically propelled or not, suitable for use on roads, including tram-cars subject to the provisions of Entry 35 of List III [Concurrent list].
58. Taxes on animals and boats.
59. Tolls.
60. Taxes on professions, trades, callings and employments.
61. Capitation taxes.
62. Taxes on entertainments and amusements to the extent levied and collected by a Panchayat or a Municipality or a Regional Council or a District Council.
63. Rates of stamp duty in respect of documents other than those specified in the provisions of List I with regard to rates of stamp duty.
64. Offences against laws with respect to any of the matters in this list.
65. Jurisdiction and powers of all courts, except the Supreme Court, with respect to any of the matters in this list.
66. Fees in respect of any of the matters in this list, but not including fees taken in any court.

== See also ==
- Union List
- Concurrent List
- Constitution of India
- Part Eleven of the Constitution of India
- Federalism in India
