= List of people who have benefited from United States immigration laws =

This is a list of notable beneficiaries of enacted immigration or nationality-related legislation in the United States. This list does not include all immigrants to the United States; rather, it only includes those who have been specifically singled out by private bills or otherwise individually mentioned during legislative proceedings.

== Naturalization via private bill legislation ==
- Gerald Bull, Canadian aerodynamicist and aerospace engineer.
- Jack Kent Cooke, Canadian owner of the Los Angeles Lakers and the Washington Redskins, became an immediate U.S. citizen via private bill.

== Cold War service to the United States ==
- Nora Isabella Samuelli (July 9, 1914–December 1986). Beneficiary of Private Bill 89-203, under which Samuelli was held and considered to have been lawfully admitted for permanent residence to the United States as of July 31, 1963, upon payment of the required visa fee. Samuelli was imprisoned for 12 years (1949–1961) by the Communist government of Romania on charges that she acted as a spy for the United States while employed in the United States Legation in Bucharest, which has been determined to be creditable service for the purposes of the Civil Service Retirement Act, provided that she makes the required employee contributions. She was awarded $ 38,114.90 compensation under Private Bill 89-108 (passed September 29, 1965) as "a gratuity for sacrifices sustained by her [Samuelli]" (i.e. twelve years imprisonment; see above).
- Lauri Törni, aka Larry Thorne (May 28, 1919 – October 18, 1965). Finnish Army captain who led an infantry company in the Finnish Winter and Continuation Wars, served as a captain in the Finnish volunteer battalion of Waffen-SS and moved to the United States after being judged for a treason in Finland after World War II. In 1953, Törni was granted a residence permit through an Act of Congress, thanks to lobbying by William "Wild Bill" Donovan, former head of the OSS. During his life, he fought under three flags: Finnish, German (when he fought the Soviets in World War II), and American (where he was known as Larry Thorne), serving in the U.S. Army Special Forces in the Vietnam War.

== Refuge ==
- Wei Jingsheng, Chinese dissident for whom a Private Bill was introduced by Senator Spencer Abraham (R-MI).
- Michel Christopher Meili, Swiss whistleblower, and his immediate family.

== Athletes ==
- Tanith Belbin, Olympics ice dancer; born in Canada, she holds dual citizenship and has competed for the United States. Citizenship expedited to compete.

== Criminal convictions ==
- Boris Kowerda, Russian exile convicted of the 1927 assassination of Pyotr Voykov, Soviet ambassador to Poland, was allowed to immigrate to the U.S. from Germany. Voykov was assassinated at a Warsaw railway station by Kowerda, purportedly in retaliation for Voykov's having signed the death warrants in 1918 for Tsar Nicholas II and the Russian Imperial Family. Kowerda died in Maryland in 1987, aged 79.

== Other notables ==
- Hope Namgyal, née Cooke, who renounced her citizenship on March 25, 1963, after marrying the Crown Prince of Sikkim, later returned to the U.S. and requested restoration of her citizenship by private bill after her husband was deposed. Because of Congressional objections to restoring the citizenship, she was granted a green card (permanent resident visa) instead, with eligibility to naturalize after five years.

== Links ==
- The "Widow Penalty"
