= Maurice H. Rindskopf =

U.S. Navy officer (1917–2011)

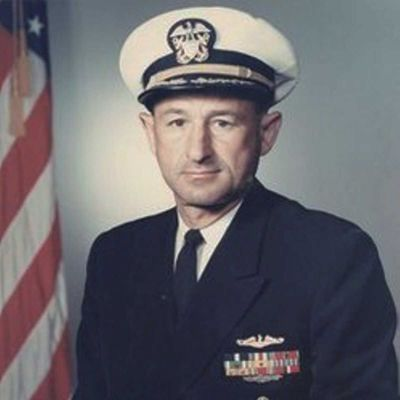
- Rear Admiral Maurice Rindskopf
- Born: Maurice Herbert Rindskopf; September 27, 1917; Brooklyn, New York
- Died: July 27, 2011 (aged 93); Annapolis, Maryland
- Burial place: Ashes scattered by a submarine in the Pacific Ocean
- Military career
- Allegiance: United States
- Branch: United States Navy
- Service years: 1938–1972
- Rank: Rear Admiral
- Nickname: Mike
- Commands: USS Drum (SS-228); USS Sea Cat (SS-399); USS Fulton (AS-11); U.S. Naval Submarine School; Submarine Flotilla 2 Director of Naval Intelligence
- Conflicts: U.S. submarine campaign against the Japanese Empire
- Awards: Navy Cross; Distinguished Service Medal; Silver Star; Legion of Merit; Bronze Star Medal; Navy Commendation Medal
- Other work: Development of modern submarine fire control and tactics Assistant Chief of Staff for Intelligence for Commander-in-Chief, US Pacific Fleet

Maurice Herbert Rindskopf (1917–2011) was the youngest officer to ascend to command of a fleet submarine in World War II; and until his death, was the last living World War II submarine commander. His entire World War II submarine career was spent on board USS Drum (SS-228), where he was awarded a Silver Star as a lieutenant in charge of torpedoes and gunnery, and the Navy Cross as its commanding officer. He culminated his career as a rear admiral and the director of naval intelligence.

== Early life and career ==
A native of Brooklyn, New York, Rindskopf graduated from the U.S. Naval Academy in 1938. He was assigned to the battleship USS Colorado (BB-45) for two years. Beginning submarine training in 1940, he joined the crew of USS Drum (SS-228) in time for World War II. Rindskopf served on board Drum for eleven patrols and was awarded a Silver Star as a junior officer for torpedo and gunnery excellence. As a junior officer, he would often take the night watch and decode messages advising of targets. He would tell the crew of a target nearby by wearing "a garish yellow aloha shirt I had purchased in Honolulu, and lo! we went to Battle Stations."

He married Sylvia Lubow on April 16, 1941; their only child, civil rights lawyer Peter Rindskopf, was born on July 25, 1942.

=== Silver Star citation ===
The President of the United States of America takes pleasure in presenting the Silver Star to Lieutenant Maurice Herbert Rindskopf (NSN: 0-81027), United States Navy, for gallantry and intrepidity in combat during World War II. During four extensive War Patrols of the U.S.S. DRUM (SS-228) in enemy waters and despite determined enemy opposition he courageously and skillfully performed his duties as Torpedo and Gunnery Officer of a United States Submarine and thus assisted materially in the sinking of an important amount of Japanese shipping. His excellent judgment and coolness under fire contributed in a large measure to the success of the ship. His conduct throughout was in keeping with the highest traditions of the United States Naval Service.

== Command of USS Drum ==
As second-in-command (Executive Officer) of Drum in June 1944, just prior to Drum's tenth patrol, the incumbent commanding officer developed gall stones. Rindskopf wrote of it in an unpublished autobiography:

I was given two choices: To take command, or to break in yet another skipper. The decision was easy, and I became the first in the [U.S. Naval Academy] class of 1938 to command a fleet boat on patrol.

During his first patrol in command Rindskopf only came across targets too small for a torpedo. He sank them by gunfire and brought the survivors aboard, putting them to work in the galley (kitchen). They became Drum's cooks.

Drum did not sink another ship in World War II following Rindskopf's detachment.

=== Navy Cross Citation ===
The President of the United States of America takes pleasure in presenting the Navy Cross to Commander Maurice Herbert Rindskopf (NSN: 0-81027), United States Navy, for extraordinary heroism in the line of his profession as Commanding Officer of the U.S.S. DRUM (SS-228), on the ELEVENTH War Patrol of that submarine during the period 9 September 1944 to 8 November 1944, in enemy controlled waters of the Luzon Straits in the Philippine Islands. Through his daring, aggressive spirit and tenacity, Commander Rindskopf skillfully launched well-planned and smartly executed attacks which resulted in the sinking of enemy ships totaling over 24,000 tons and in damaging additional vessels totaling over 8,000 tons. Through his experience and sound judgment Commander Rindskopf brought his ship safely back to port. His conduct throughout was an inspiration to his officers and men and in keeping with the highest traditions of the United States Naval Service.

== Summary of World War II ==
Summary of CDR Maurice H. Rindskopf's USS Drum (SS-228) War Patrols
	Departing From	Date	Commanding Officer	Days	Wartime Credit Ships/Tonnage	JANAC Credit Ships/Tonnage	Patrol Area
Drum-1	Pearl Harbor, TH	April 1942	Robert H. Rice	56	4 / 24,000	4 / 20,644	Empire; Participated in Battle of Midway en route home
Drum-2	Pearl Harbor, TH	July 1942	Robert H. Rice	54	zero / zero	zero / zero	Truk
Drum-3	Pearl Harbor, TH	September 1942	Robert H. Rice	46	3 / 19,500	3 / 13,208	Empire
Drum-4	Pearl Harbor, TH	November 1942	Bernard F. McMahon	56	zero / zero	zero / zero	Empire
Drum-5	Pearl Harbor, TH	March 1943	Bernard F. McMahon	47	3 / 15,900	2 / 10,189	-->Brisbane
Drum-6	Brisbane, Australia	June 1943	Bernard F. McMahon	49	1 / 8,700	1 / 5,087	Bismarck
Drum-7	Brisbane, Australia	August 1943	Bernard F. McMahon	51	3 / 12,900	1 / 1,334	Bismarck
Drum-8	Brisbane, Australia	November 1943	Delbert F. Williamson	34	1 / 11,900	1 / 11,621	-->Pearl Harbor
Drum-9	Pearl Harbor, TH	April 1944	Delbert F. Williamson	50	zero / zero	zero / zero	Bonins
Drum-10	Pearl Harbor, TH	June 1944	Maurice H. Rindskopf	51	zero / zero	zero / zero	Palau
Drum-11	Pearl Harbor, TH	September 1944	Maurice H. Rindskopf	59	4 / 25,100	3 / 18,497	Luzon Strait
				Totals:	19 / 118,000	15 / 80,580

Drum's rankings compared with Other Top Submarines
Tonnage Rank	Tonnage Sunk	Ship Rank	Ships Sunk
8	80,580	20	15

CDR Rindskopf's Ranking Compared with Other Top Skippers
Ranking	Number of Patrols	Ships/Tons Credited	Ships/Tons JANAC
150	2	4 / 25,100	3 / 18,497

== Post-war career ==
After World War II, Rindskopf took command of USS Sea Cat (SS-399). His command style was marked by the lack of his crew's practice of obscenity and profanity. "His stated position was that such language was simply evidence of mental deficiency on the part of the user, and the crew followed his example as long as he was in command." Later Rindkopf refined submarine fire control and tactics; commanded USS Fulton (AS-11); had command of the U.S. Naval Submarine School in Groton, CT; commanded two submarine flotillas; explored the use of hydrofoils in harbor defense; became the Director of Naval Intelligence; and Assistant Chief of Staff for Intelligence for the Commander in Chief, U.S. Pacific Fleet. Retiring from the Navy in 1972, Rindskopf worked for Westinghouse for 16 years.

== Death ==
Rindskopf died of prostate cancer on July 27, 2011, at his home in Annapolis. His wife and son preceded him in death; he was survived by his granddaughter Amy Kathryn Rindskopf and two great-grandchildren: a great-grandson (Jasper Rindskopf Schultz) and a great-granddaughter (Nanarol Zephyr Schultz).

Several obituaries (e.g. The Annapolis Capital, Naval History Magazine) confused Rindskopf's eleven patrols onboard Drum as eleven patrols in command of Drum. He was only in command for patrols 10 and 11, yet he had a hand in every sinking in Drum's history.

== Popular culture ==
- Film and swim star
