= New London High School (Connecticut) =

Location
- 490 Jefferson Avenue; New London, Connecticut 06320; United States; 41°21′33″N 72°07′17″W

Information
- Type: Public
- School district: New London Public Schools
- CEEB code: 070530
- Principal: Jose Ortiz
- Grades: 9–12
- Enrollment: 593 (2023–2024)
- Colors: Green and gold
- Athletics conference: Eastern Connecticut Conference
- Nickname: Whalers

New London High School is a high school in New London, Connecticut operated by the New London Public Schools school district. New London High School is a Public Magnet School.

== History ==
In 1678, The Bartlett Grammar School was established. Robert Bartlett, a New London resident, gave up his property to create a space for public education. In 1855, Bartlett Grammar was renamed Bartlett High School until 1873, when the property was replaced by the Bulkeley School which has since been shut down.

In 1896, Robert E. Bartlett Grammar School was re-established in a new location. Then in 1951, Bartlett Grammar was renamed and repurposed into the now New London High School.

Robert Bartlett, a New London resident who died in 1678, willed that all his property be used to benefit public education. The Bartlett Grammar School was named in his honor, and renamed in 1855 to Bartlett High School. The high school was used until 1873 when it was replaced by the Bulkeley School which operated from 1873 to 1951. In 1896, the Robert E. Bartlett Grammar School, located at 216 Broad Street was established and named after the founder of the "old Bartlett High School". The building was repurposed in 1951 when other district schools were merged to form the New London High School. The building is presently under private ownership and used as an office building. New London High School is currently located at 490 Jefferson Ave.

== Curriculum ==
New London High School is a multi magnet school, also called NLHSMMC, that integrates three academic pathways: International Education, Performing & Visual Arts, and STEM.

== Funding ==
The New London Public School district’s budget is composed of two types of funding sources: 1.) taxpayer dollars that support the general fund; and 2.) grant monies. The school district receives almost 30 million dollars of federal, state, and private grant funds. This large amount of grant funding is aligned to NLPS being a high-needs, low-performing school district, categorized as one of the Alliance Districts by the CT State Department of Education.

A second bucket of grant funds have been competitively awarded to NLPS for several of its innovative programming ideas. Most recently, school districts received additional funding from federal and state levels aligned to COVID-19 relief dollars. These new COVID-19 funding streams are being used to support physical (facility, masking, testing) and mental health, learning loss, and extended academic and social-emotional support services. Dollars aligned to such COVID-19 relief areas are available for two years.

== U.S. News & World Report rankings ==
In 2014, the school received a bronze medal ranking from the U.S. News & World Report magazine.

== Contraceptive clinic ==
In March 2012, a clinic at the school operated by Child & Family Agency of Southeastern Connecticut began to provide condoms and birth control prescriptions to students.

== Notable alumni ==
- Thomas M. Waller (1839), 51st Governor of Connecticut, 1883–1885
- Rajai Davis (1999), Major League Baseball player (2006–2019)
- A. J. Dillon (born 1998), American football running back for the National Football League Green Bay Packers
- Kris Dunn (2012), National Basketball Association player (2016–)
- John Ellis, Major League Baseball player (1969–1981)
- Jose B. Gonzalez, poet and educator
- India Pagán, basketball player and Olympian
- Peter Rindskopf (1960), civil rights lawyer
- Jordan Reed (2008), National Football League player (2013–2020)
- David Reed (2005), former NFL player
- Tim Riordan (1978), United States Football League and NFL player (1984–1987)
- Dawn Robinson, singer; founding member of R&B vocal group En Vogue
- Signe Margaret Stuart (1955), abstract painter
- Tyson Wheeler (1994), NBA player (1999), NCAA men's basketball coach (2010–)
