= Nora Samuelli =

- Born: Nora Isabella Samuelli; July 9, 1914; Romania
- Died: December 1986 (aged 72); Washington, D.C. United States
- Occupation: Spy for the U.S. in Romania during the Cold War

Nora Isabella Samuelli (July 9, 1914 – December 1986) was a Romanian spy for the United States while employed at its Legation in Bucharest during the Cold War – authorizes Private Bill 89-203, under which Samuelli will be held and considered to have been lawfully admitted for permanent residence to the United States as of July 31, 1963, upon payment of the required visa fee.

== Background ==
In 1949, Nora Samuelli and her sister, Annie, were arrested as spies in Bucharest by the then Communist government. After "nine months of torture and interrogation, the two sisters were sentenced to long prison terms. Then in 1961, after 11 years and 340 days (July 24, 1949 – June 14, 1961) in separate security prisons and cells, the two were quietly ransomed out by a relative in the United States, and exiled as stateless refugees. While Annie was granted British citizenship within only a few months, it took three years, two presidents and the passage of Bills on her behalf in the US Congress for Nora to receive the same privilege in America."

The two Private Bills of 1965 which benefited Nora Samuelli were:

- a) 89-203, which granted her permanent residency under the Immigration and Nationality Act (passed Congress on November 7, 1965).
- b) 89-108, which awarded her $38,114.90 (USD) compensation under as "a gratuity for sacrifices sustained by her [Samuelli]" (i.e. 12 years imprisonment; see above) and eligible to be covered under the Civil Service Retirement Act (passed on September 29, 1965).

== Death ==
Nora Samuelli died in December 1986 in Washington, D.C., aged 72.
