= Entry Tax =

Entry Tax is a tax on the movement of goods from one local area to another imposed by the state governments in India. It is levied by the recipient state, the validity of which is seriously in doubt and dispute across India. The tax was introduced on 1 September 2000.

The tax applies to dealers, industrial, commercial or trading undertakings, central and state government companies, firms, societies and clubs which carry on business.

This tax has now has been subsumed by the GST.
