= Peter Rindskopf =

American civil rights layer (1942–1971)

Peter Eric Rindskopf (July 25, 1942 – October 9, 1971) was an American civil rights lawyer.

== Early life ==
The only son of Rear Admiral Maurice H. Rindskopf and Sylvia Lubow Rindskopf, he was born in 1942 in Connecticut. His father, then a lieutenant commander, was serving on the USS Drum in the Pacific Ocean theatre of World War II and did not learn of his birth until three weeks later. He attended New London High School, where he was elected senior class president for the 1959–1960 school year, and graduated as valedictorian. He would go on to Yale University, where he was a member of the Yale Bulldogs swimming and diving team under captain Mike Austin. He completed his bachelor's degree in 1964 and then entered Yale Law School. There, he began his work in civil rights law, through which he met the woman who would become his wife, University of Michigan Law School student Elizabeth Roediger, when they were both on a summer volunteer program in the Southern United States with the Law Students Civil Rights Research Council in 1965; Roediger would later describe it as "love at first sight", and she would frequently travel between Ann Arbor, Michigan, and New Haven, Connecticut, to visit him during the remainder of her time in law school. The two married in 1968.

== Career ==
After his law school graduation, Rindskopf moved to Atlanta, Georgia to join the NAACP Legal Defense and Educational Fund (the "Inc. Fund") as cooperating council, while his wife worked at an Emory University-connected legal organization; the two quickly began making their mark in the civil rights movement. In his short career, Rindskopf represented clients in a number of notable cases, including several before the Supreme Court. One of his appearances before the Supreme Court was for Socialist Workers Party presidential candidate Linda Jenness in Jenness v. Fortson (403 U.S. 431 (1971)) in an unsuccessful challenge to Georgia's ballot access standards.

Rindskopf also took on some cases relating to the military. In April 1969 he represented Pfc. Dennis Davis, who received an undesirable discharge two weeks before the end of his two-year tour in response to his publication of a clandestine newspaper known as The Last Harass. Later that year he defended Jack K. Riley, an African American soldier stationed at Fort Bragg convicted of distribution of anti-war literature in what he referred to as a "frame-up". In 1970 he defended four more soldiers on similar charges of promoting disloyalty. He represented Vietnam War protester Thomas Jolley before the Board of Immigration Appeals and the Court of Appeals for the Fifth Circuit (441 F.2d 1245 (1971)), unsuccessfully arguing that Jolley, who had renounced U.S. citizenship in Canada after receiving a draft notice and then returned to the United States, should not be subject to deportation.

== Death and legacy ==
Rindskopf was driving on Georgia State Route 197 west of Clayton on October 9, 1971 when his car ran off the road and overturned, killing him. He was survived by his parents, his wife, and their nine-month-old daughter Amy Kathryn Rindskopf. His wife bequeathed The Lady with Blue Face, a collage by African American artist Romare Bearden, to the High Museum of Art in Atlanta, Georgia in his memory. She also took over her husband's caseload of more than 100 cases with the Inc. Fund. One of the more notable of these was Gooding v. Wilson (405 U.S. 518 (1972)), a case about fighting words for which Rindskopf had successfully obtained certiorari before his death and which his wife would bring to a successful conclusion. She would go on to remarry and become dean of the McGeorge School of Law in 2002, while daughter Amy followed her parents into legal practice in Boston.
