= Public and private bills =

Bill which proposes a law affecting only limited individuals or entities

Proposed laws, while they are being drafted, debated and amended in a legislature, are called bills: these draft laws are often categorized into public bills and private bills. A public bill is a proposed law which would apply generally throughout the relevant community or polity—or, in other words, it is a bill which is addressed to the community at large and applies to all persons within the jurisdiction (territory or power) of the relevant legislature. A private bill is a proposal for a law that will apply to, or effect a change upon, a particular subject identified by the law itself: in other words, it is a law that works upon a single person or group, or area, or organization, or relationship, et cetera.

The vast majority of bills proposed (and laws made) by modern parliaments (at least those operating in open, democratic societies) are public bills. This type of general, rule-focused, unbiased and impersonal legislating is: more generally applicable over time; more neutral as to particular people or companies (it does not seek to target particular persons for retribution, for example, or unfair benefices); more consistent with theories of the rule of law (it establishes, in advance, rules that will persist and apply to all, rather than one-off targeted legal changes); more suited to the protection of individual rights; more consistent with the separation of powers (under which doctrine judicial proceedings, rather than legislative fiats, determine individuals' rights and obligations); and more in accord with constrained legislative powers under constitutions.

Examples of private bills include bills granting a particular named person citizenship or some government office a legal right to particular revenue streams (and, more common before the wave of family law reform in the 1960s-70s, bills granting two named persons a "legislative divorce"). Private or subject-specific laws can afford their 'targets' relief from a general law that is otherwise applicable, grant a unique benefit or power not available under the general law, or relieve someone of legal responsibility for some wrongful act they have done, post hoc. There are many historical examples of private bills, even in democratic countries, although their use has changed over time.

In modern parliamentary practice, many bills are mixed in nature, having both private and public aspects: these are called hybrid bills. Some public laws set out such narrow terms of applicability that, while they are expressed in general terms, in practice they apply to only one person or organization, making them de facto private laws. This may be used (successfully or unsuccessfully) to maneuver around constitutional (written or unwritten) limits, or prohibitions imposed by international law.

A private bill is not to be confused with a private member's bill, which is a bill introduced by a "private member" of the legislature rather than by the ministry.

== United Kingdom ==
Public bills are the most common bills introduced in the Parliament of the United Kingdom. If they are enacted, they become public general acts (in contrast with local and personal acts).

Private bills create two types of act of Parliament in the United Kingdom. The first are acts for the benefit of individuals (known as private or personal acts) which have historically often dealt with divorces or granting British nationality to foreigners, but in modern times are generally limited to authorising marriages which would otherwise not be legal. The most recent such act was made in 1987.

The second type are public acts for the benefit of organisations, or authorising major projects such as railways or canals, or granting extra powers to local authorities (known as local acts). Private bills were used in the nineteenth century to create corporations and grant monopolies. They are still used in relation to large infrastructure projects, such as HS2, where law is being created primarily to give effect to rights and powers being exercised by a private (even if largely state owned) entity.

There is another classification known as a hybrid instrument which shares characteristics of both public and private bills. Hybrid bills become public acts.

== Canada ==
Divorce in Canada prior to the passage of the Divorce Act of 1968 was sometimes handled by private laws. If unavailable by administrative or judicial means, it was possible to obtain a legislative divorce by application to the Senate of Canada, which reviewed and investigated petitions for divorce, which would then be voted upon by the Senate and subsequently made into law.

== United States ==
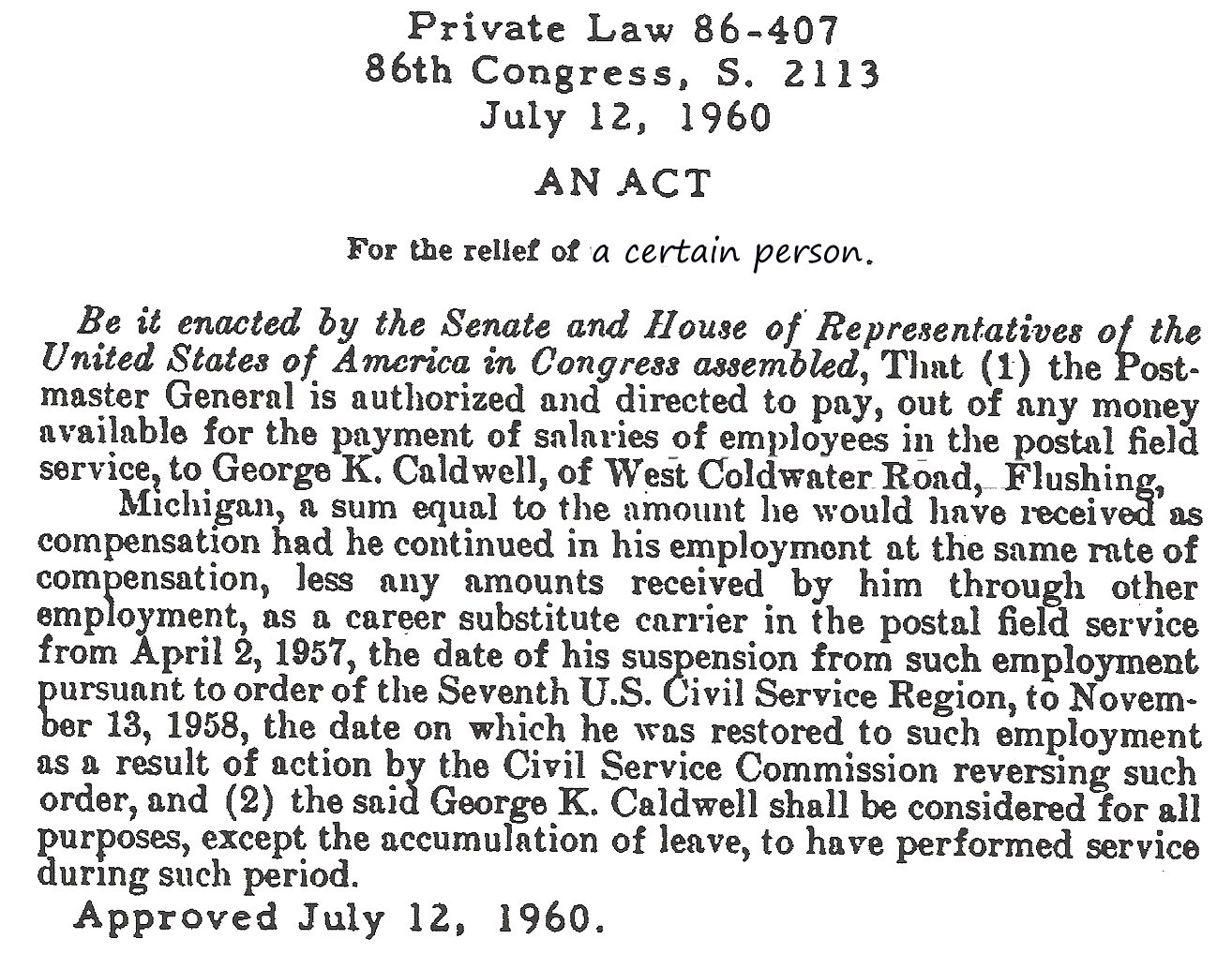
Private Law 86-407, providing backpay for a postman; the file has been partially redacted

Public bills are also the most common type of law made by the United States Congress and other (e.g. state) legislatures in the US. Notably, the Constitution of the United States prohibits bills of attainder in both state and federal legislatures, meaning private laws cannot be used to punish any specific individual or organization. This clause does not, however, prohibit private laws altogether. It leaves room for the introduction and passage of private bills which are favorable to persons or corporations.

An example of a beneficiary of a private bill was Mary Dimmick Harrison, widow of President Benjamin Harrison, to whom Congress granted a considerable $5,000 annual pension in 1938 (equivalent to $114,000 in 2025). Presidential widows had traditionally been awarded a pension, but Mary had married Harrison only after he had left office (she was also 25 years his junior, and was his first wife's niece), and thus Congressional intervention was relatively controversial, even for a private bill.

Congress wrote many private bills in the aftermath of the Civil War to correct service records, grant promotions, or award pensions. Congress also passed private bills to quiet title, convey property to individuals, or release individual government employees from civil liability. Congress also passed private bills to award damages in claims against the government, until creating the United States Court of Claims in 1855 to take over that responsibility. Additional legislation strengthened the Court of Claims and lessened Congressional private bill workloads, such as the Bowman Act of 1883 and the 1887 Tucker Act.

Congress has also awarded citizenship or otherwise assisted thousands of individuals with immigration via private bills (see list of people who have benefited from United States immigration laws). In many cases, such individuals were not otherwise qualified under the immigration laws (including due to quota limits), or the immigration laws were not being timely processed in their favor. Congress often intervened to benefit those who had unusual extenuating circumstances or had performed meritorious service to the United States.

In the United States, private bills were previously common. Historically, private bills made up to 1% of all legislation per session (such as in 1904), but by the 2000s, less than 0.1% of legislation concerned private bills. By the 2010s, virtually no private bills were being passed. Federal agencies are now able to deal with most of the issues that were previously dealt with under private bills as these agencies have been granted sufficient discretion by the United States Congress to deal with exceptions to the general legislative scheme of various laws. The kinds of private bills that are still introduced include grants of citizenship to individuals who are otherwise ineligible for normal visa processing; alleviation of tax liabilities; armed services decorations; and veteran benefits.

== See also ==
- Private member's bill – Legislation not proposed by the executive
- Ius singulare
