= Court of Wards (India) =

The Court of Wards was a legal body created by the East India Company on a model similar to the Court of Wards and Liveries that had existed in England from 1540 to 1660. Its purpose was to protect heirs and their estates when the heir was deemed to be a minor and therefore incapable of acting independently. Estates would be managed on behalf of the heir, who would also be educated and nurtured through the offices of the Court in order to ensure that he gained the necessary skills to manage his inheritance independently. Control of the estates would in normal circumstances return to the heir on his coming of age.

Rulers in India had some informal provisions for the physical protection of their young heirs before the European control of large parts of the sub-continent, as exemplified by Humayun leaving his young son safely in the care of his brother Askari, even though the two had an acrimonious relationship. The usefulness of creating a Court of Wards in the country was recognised by Philip Francis, a member of the Council of Bengal, as early as 1773, but it was not until August 1797 that the institution was finally established in the Presidency of Bengal by the Governor-General, Sir John Shore. The court had powers of supervision regarding the finances and upbringing of the heirs to estates, in case an estate owner died or was incapacitated. Its powers extended as far as allowing the Court to choose different heirs, to dissolve successions, and to take direct control of estates, including taking such control over lands and revenues as was found necessary to protect the interests of the British. Similar institutions were later established in other areas controlled by the East India Company - Assam, the Bombay Presidency, the Central Provinces, the North West Frontier Province, Orissa, the Punjab, Sindh, and the United Provinces - and were emulated by rulers such as the raja of the Gadwal samasthan. Less similar was the body created to serve the self-governing princely state of the Nizam of Hyderabad.

The Court of Wards continued in the era of the British Raj. Estates sometimes welcomed the intervention of the Court of Wards because the stewardship of the British authorities, who invested funds wisely, had a tendency to boost their economic position. They were often badly managed prior to the involvement of the court because complex systems, influenced by both nepotism and sycophancy, dramatically affected the rental income of the ruling families. The bureaucratic system introduced by the Court, whose appointed officials had no ties to the area, resolved the issue although, being focussed entirely on what was best for the owners, it did so without considering the consequences for the tenants.
