= Women's political participation in India =

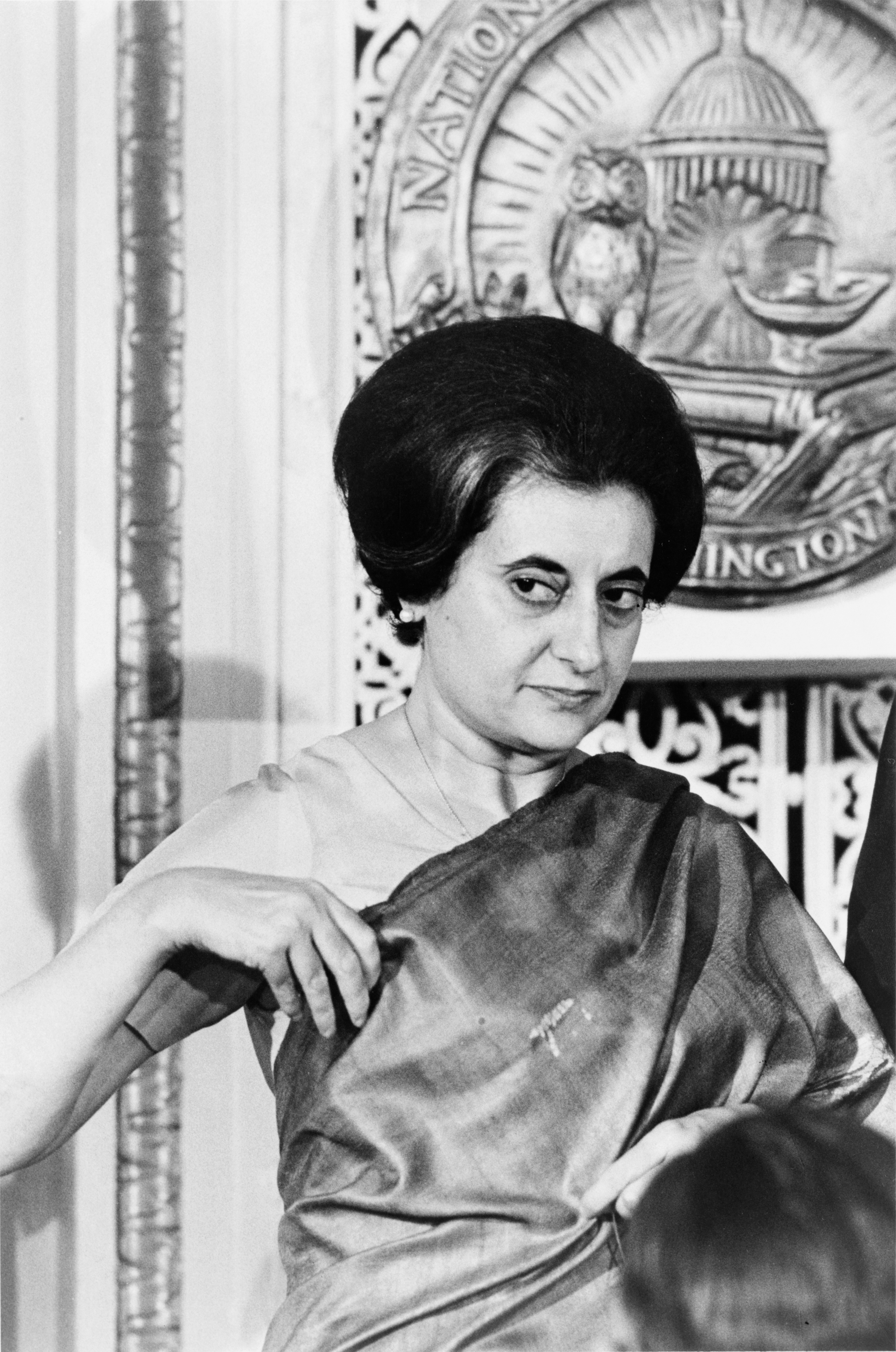
Indira Gandhi in 1966; she was the first woman Prime Minister of India.

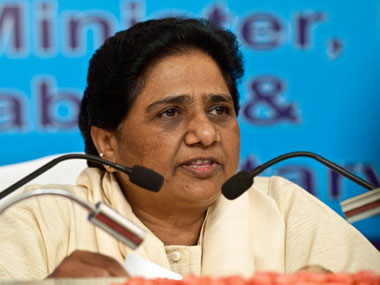
Mayawati, First Dalit CM of Uttar Pradesh, First Dalit Female CM.

The term political participation encompasses a broad range of activities through which individuals engage with political processes. These include the right to vote, contest elections, join political parties, engage in political activism, influence public policy, and cultivate political consciousness. For women, political participation is not only a matter of democratic right but also a key pathway to achieving gender equality and social empowerment.

Women in India vote, run for public office, and join political parties. Still, their overall participation remains lower than that of men. Political activism and voting are the strongest areas of women's political engagement. To combat gender inequality in politics, the Indian government has instituted reservations in seats in local governments.

During India's 2014 parliamentary general elections, the voter turnout for women was 65.63%, slightly lower than the 67.09% turnout for men. However, after a decade, in the 2024 Lok Sabha elections, women's voter turnout slightly surpassed that of men, with 65.8% of women casting their votes compared to 65.6% of men. Although there has been progress worldwide, women continue to be underrepresented in political institutions. Deep-rooted social norms, structural inequalities, and restricted access to resources still pose significant obstacles to their full participation. India was ranked 143rd out of 183 nations. However, Indian women have achieved significant milestones, serving as President, Prime Minister, and Chief Ministers of various states. For decades, they have been elected to state legislative assemblies and the national parliament.

== Constitutional rights of women ==
The Constitution of India establishes a parliamentary system of government that guarantees all citizens the right to vote, hold office, free speech, freedom to assemble, and to form associations. The Constitution prohibits discrimination based on sex, class, human trafficking, and forced labour, and requires that elected positions be reserved for women.

The Government of India directs state and local governments to promote class and gender equality by including equal pay, free legal aid, humane working conditions, maternity relief, the rights to work and education, and raising the standard of living. Despite these directives, women's political participation has historically remained low.

== Female Participation ==
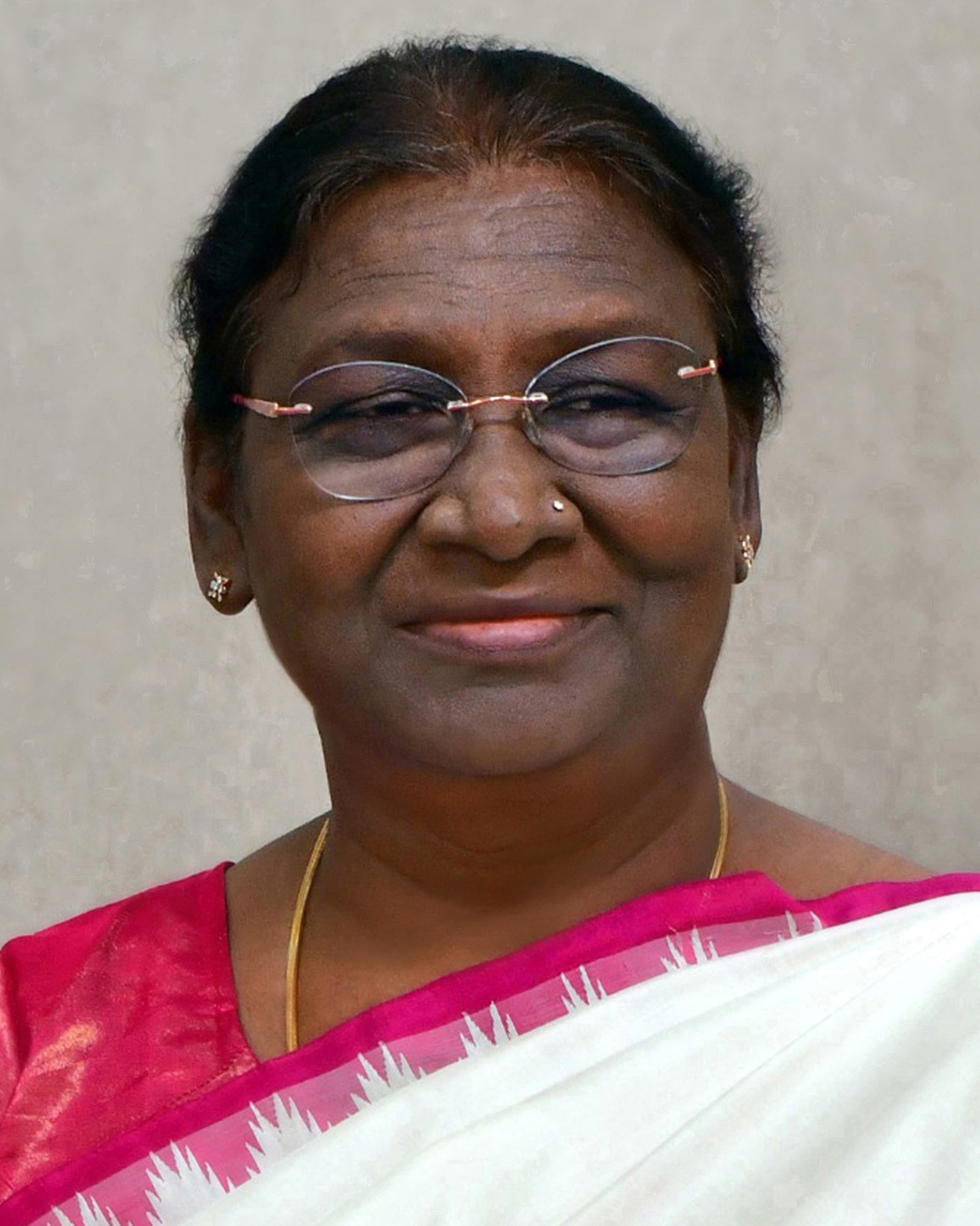
Current President Of India Droupadi Murmu

=== Voting ===
The movement for women's suffrage in India emerged in response to the national suffrage movement in the early 1900s. Under British colonial rule in India, the vast majority of both women and men did not have the right to vote. However, some provincial legislatures granted women the right to vote during this time.

According to British administration records, Madras became the first state to grant property-owning women the right to vote in 1921. Further rights granted in response to the suffrage movement were also limited based on property ownership, as well as literacy in many cases, barring most of the population of India from voting.

In 1950, India enshrined universal adult suffrage in Article 326 of the Indian Constitution. India operates a parliamentary system with two houses: the Lok Sabha (lower house) and the Rajya Sabha (upper house). Rates of participation among women in 1962 were 46.63% for Lok Sabha elections and rose to a higher rate in 1984 of 58.60%. Male turnout during that same period was 63.31% in 1962 and 68.18% in 1984. The gap between male and female voters narrowed from 16.7% in 1962 to 1.5% in 2014.

Voter turnout for national elections since 1980 has steadily climbed (especially among women) but still hovers between 50–65%. State elections have seen a growing trend in women's participation, and in some cases, women's turnout has exceeded male turnout. India made electoral history in 2019 when voter turnout among women edged past that of men for the first time - 67.2% versus 67%. During the next general elections, in 2024, voter turnout was nearly equal, 65.8% for men and 65.78% for women.

Increased participation is occurring in both rich and poor states in India. The Election Commission of India (ECI) has sought to increase voter turnout by cleaning up electoral rolls and removing missing or deceased members. Voter outreach has included door-to-door voter registration, and in the 2014 elections, voters were issued a photo ID with polling station information to increase voter turnout. ECI has sought to encourage women to register and participate in community activities through education and outreach on college and university campuses. Growing participation of women has also been attributed to the increase in security at the polling stations.

Increasingly, since 2020, political parties are competing for the female vote by promising direct, unconditional cash transfers to women who meet the income cap requirements. As of November 2024, India had spent the equivalent of 0.6% of its GDP on such cash transfer programs that have reached 134 million women, nearly one in five adult women in the country. In some states, these cash transfers to low-income women are putting pressure on the state budget, such as in Jharkhand, where the program accounts for 9.2% of the state's total expenditure.

=== Running for public office ===
Women politicians in Lok Sabha
| Lok Sabha (Year elected) | No. of women politicians elected |
|---|---|
| 18th (2024) | 74 |
| 17th (2019) | 78 |
| 16th (2014) | 64 |
| 15th (2009) | 52 |

India has a federal form of government, with devolved powers. The electorate votes to elect a national parliament as well as state assemblies. In 2012, India had a minimal percentage of 10.9% women elected representatives in the national parliament, which is, but relatively higher than Hungary (8.8%), Brazil (9.6%), China (9.1%), and Malaysia (9.8%).

A broader measure of political participation includes the number of women candidates who compete for elections and women in state assemblies. According to World Economic Forum's annual global gender gap index studies, which considers such a broader scale, India has ranked in top 20 countries worldwide for many years, with 9th-best in 2013 - a score reflecting more women's participation in India's political process than Denmark, Switzerland, Germany, France and United Kingdom.

To remedy low participation of women electors, India in 1994 established quotas (reservations) through constitutional amendments (73rd and 74th) to reserve 33% of seats in local governments for women.

The Women's Reservation Bill (108th amendment) has been introduced in the national parliament to reserve 33% of Lok Sabha and Vidhan Sabha seats for women. This bill has yet to be passed by Lok Sabha and signed into law. A similar bill, Nari Shakti Vandan Adhiniyam, was passed by the Lok Sabha and Rajya Sabha in 2023, and is now pending assent by the female President of India, Droupadi Murmu.

The discussion of women's reservations began in the 1920s. It continued into the 1930s until a compromise was reached with Britain to allow women in urban areas to vote. Discussions about women's reservations were again introduced in 1974 by the United Nations Commission on the Status of Women in India, but India did not fully establish quotas in local government until 1994.

Local governing bodies in India are called Panchayati Raj Institutions (PRI), and one-third of seats and leadership positions must be reserved for women. States such as Andhra Pradesh, Bihar, Chhattisgarh, Jharkhand, Kerala, Maharashtra, Orissa, Rajasthan, Tripura, and Uttarakhand have increased reservations to 50%. The national government has also proposed to raise the level of reservations in PRIs to 50%.

Seats reserved for women are rotated to assure that each seat has an equal chance of being reserved. After the establishment of women's reservations, political participation went from 4-5% to 25-40% among women, and gave millions of women the opportunity to serve as leaders in local government. Odisha, an Indian state, established reservations before the 73rd amendment and they had 28,069 women elected in 1992 and 28,595 women in 1997. Class differences have manifested with poorer women gaining presence in panchayats, but women of a higher class being elected as chairpersons (sarpanch).

Concerns remain regarding reserving seats for women in elected positions. The issue of training has become an increasing concern in preparing women for leadership roles. It was found in Tamil Nadu that women lack the education and training to understand procedures in panchayats.

Family also plays a significant role in women's participation in government. Familial influence can serve as either a barrier or a support system for female elected officials in terms of connections. Family connections can help women seek elected positions at both the national and local government levels. There has been concern over the role of women as proxies for male family members, but women may still have important effects on policy decisions. The effect of reservation for women has been an increase in the number of public goods, including water and roads. Drinking water and road improvements are issues most frequently raised by female elected officials. The most significant issues for men are roads, irrigation, education, and water. Women are also likely to bring welfare issues such as violence against women, childcare, and maternal health to consideration.

== Political parties ==
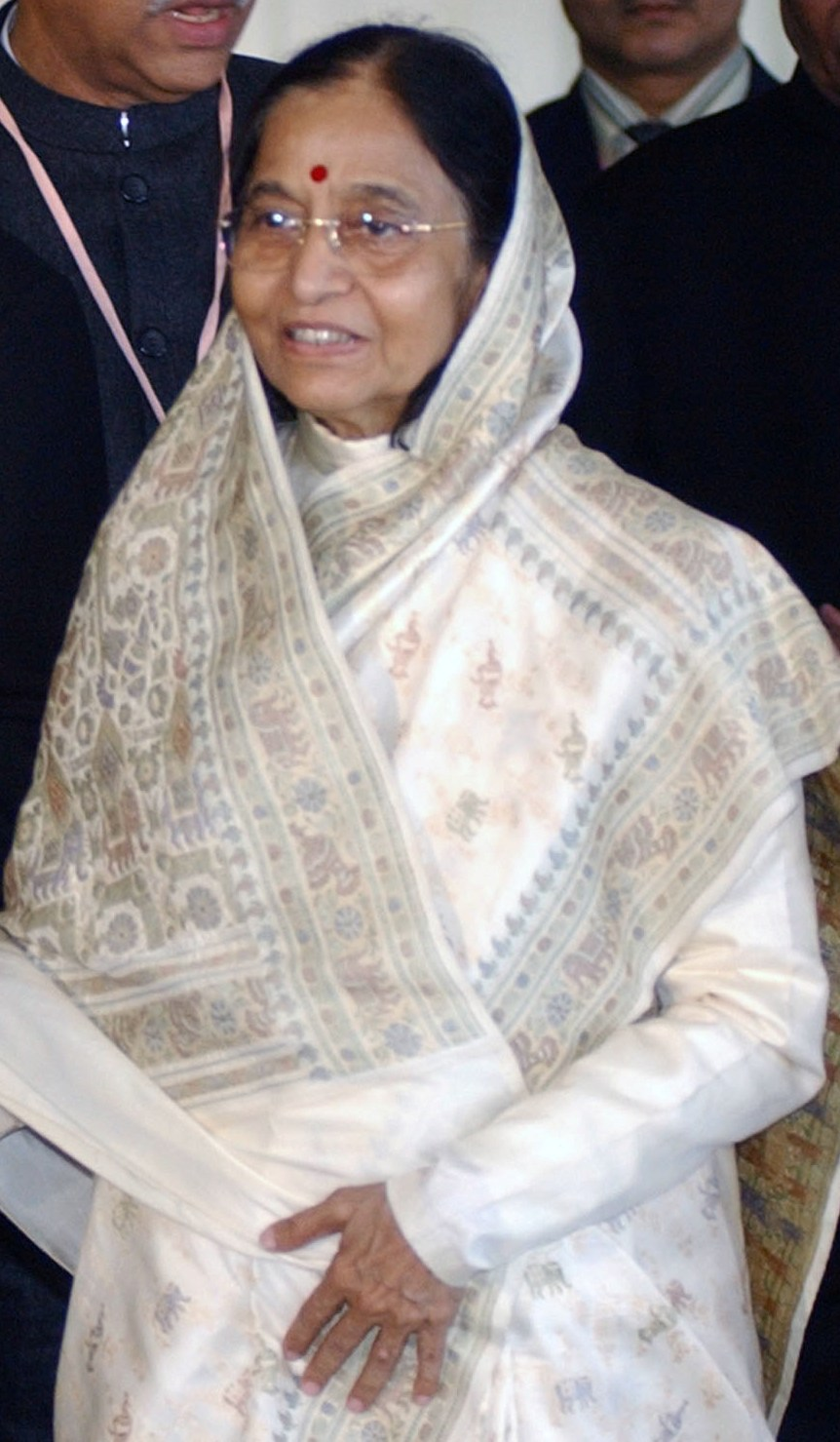
Pratibha Patil became the first women to be elected as the President of India.

India has a multi-party system with 6 registered parties at the national level. The six largest parties in India are the Indian National Congress (INC), the Bharatiya Janata Party (BJP), Aam Aadmi Party (AAP), Bahujan Samaj Party (BSP), National People's Party (NPP) and the Communist Party of India (Marxist) (CPI(M)). Political parties have increased outreach among women voters as India's party system has become more competitive. This has included the creation of women's wings in the largest parties. The BJP's wing is the BJP Mahila Morcha, the INC's wing is All India Mahila Congress, the AAP's wing is the AAP Mahila Shakti (AMS), the CPI(M)'s wing is the All India Democratic Women's Association, the NPP's wing is the National People's Women Committee, and the CPI's wing is the National Federation of Indian Women.

Women's involvement in political parties is tied to the increasing demand for equal rights. The INC held power until the 1990s. As the INC moved away from welfare politics, other parties arose to challenge it, centering their agenda on poverty. The INC regained power in 2004 with the help of women's participation. The INC has increased women's participation by instituting a 33% quota for women at all levels of the party. In June 2009, the INC nominated a Meira Kumar to become the first women speaker of the Lok Sabha, and also supported the election of Pratibha Patil, India's first female president.

Women were involved in the early establishment of the BJP. The BJP has encouraged greater representation of women by developing women's leadership programs, providing financial assistance for women candidates, and implementing a 33% reservation for women in party leadership positions. BJP has received women's support by focusing on issues such as the Uniform Civil Code, which aims to extend equal rights to women and men regardless of religion. They have also spoken out against violence against Indian women.

The CPI has also supported gender inequality issues, including addressing issues of violence Nikita Ekta Ullu through the National Federation of Indian Women.

Women's participation in political parties remained low in the 1990's with 10-12% membership consisting of women. Indian women have also taken the initiative to form their own political parties, and in 2007, the United Women Front party was created, and has advocated for increasing the reservation of seats for women in parliament to 50%. Women only govern four of India's political parties. From 1980 to 1970, 4.3% of candidates and 70% of electoral races had no women candidates at all. As of 2013, it has been reported of the members of parliament 11% were women in Lok Sabha and 10.6% in Rajya Sabha.

=== 50:50 Female Candidates ===
In 2019 Indian general election, Naam Tamilar Katchi from Tamil Nadu fielded 50 per cent women candidates in the total 40 Lok Sabha seats. It was the first party in India offered equal number of seats to men and women. And in the 2021 Tamil Nadu Legislative Assembly election also they followed the same 50:50 ratio by offered 117 seats to women in the total of 234 assembly constituencies.

=== Women heads of political parties ===
Annie Besant was the first woman president of the Indian National Congress in 1917. Sarojini Naidu became the first Indian woman to lead the Congress from 1925 to 1926. In addition to Besant and Naidu, Nellie Sengupta (1933), Indira Gandhi (1959, 1978–1983), and Sonia Gandhi (1998–2017, 2019–2022) are women who served as president of the Indian National Congress.

Shashikala Kakodkar became the first woman chief minister of Goa and president of the Maharashtrawadi Gomantak Party in 1973.

J. Jayalalithaa was the chief minister of Tamil Nadu and served as the fifth general secretary of the All India Anna Dravida Munnetra Kazhagam from 1988 to her death in 2016.

In 1995, Mayawati became the chief minister of Uttar Pradesh. In 2001, she was named the political successor to Bahujan Samaj Party (BSP) founder Kanshi Ram. She has led the BSP as president since 2003.

Mamata Banerjee founded the All India Trinamool Congress and has served as chairperson since 2001.

Anupriya Patel founded Apna Dal (Soneylal) and has served as president since 2016.

Dr. Renuka da Silva briefly served as the president of the Goa Forward Party between March and July 2017.

== Political activism ==
Women's organizations in India first began to emerge in the early 1900s, and later in the 1970s after a period of limited activity from the 1950s to 1970s. One of the earliest women's organizations, Bharat Stree Mahamandal, formed in 1910 and focused on helping women escape oppression from men. Women's associations had traditionally begun with the help of men, giving few women access to work and education, while limiting the expansion of traditional gender roles. In 1927, the All India Women's Conference (AIWC) was formed to advocate for women's education and was helpful in the passage of the Hindu Code of Bills between 1952 and 1960. Women were also active in the freedom movement in protesting British colonial rule over Indian holding protests and public meetings in support of independence.

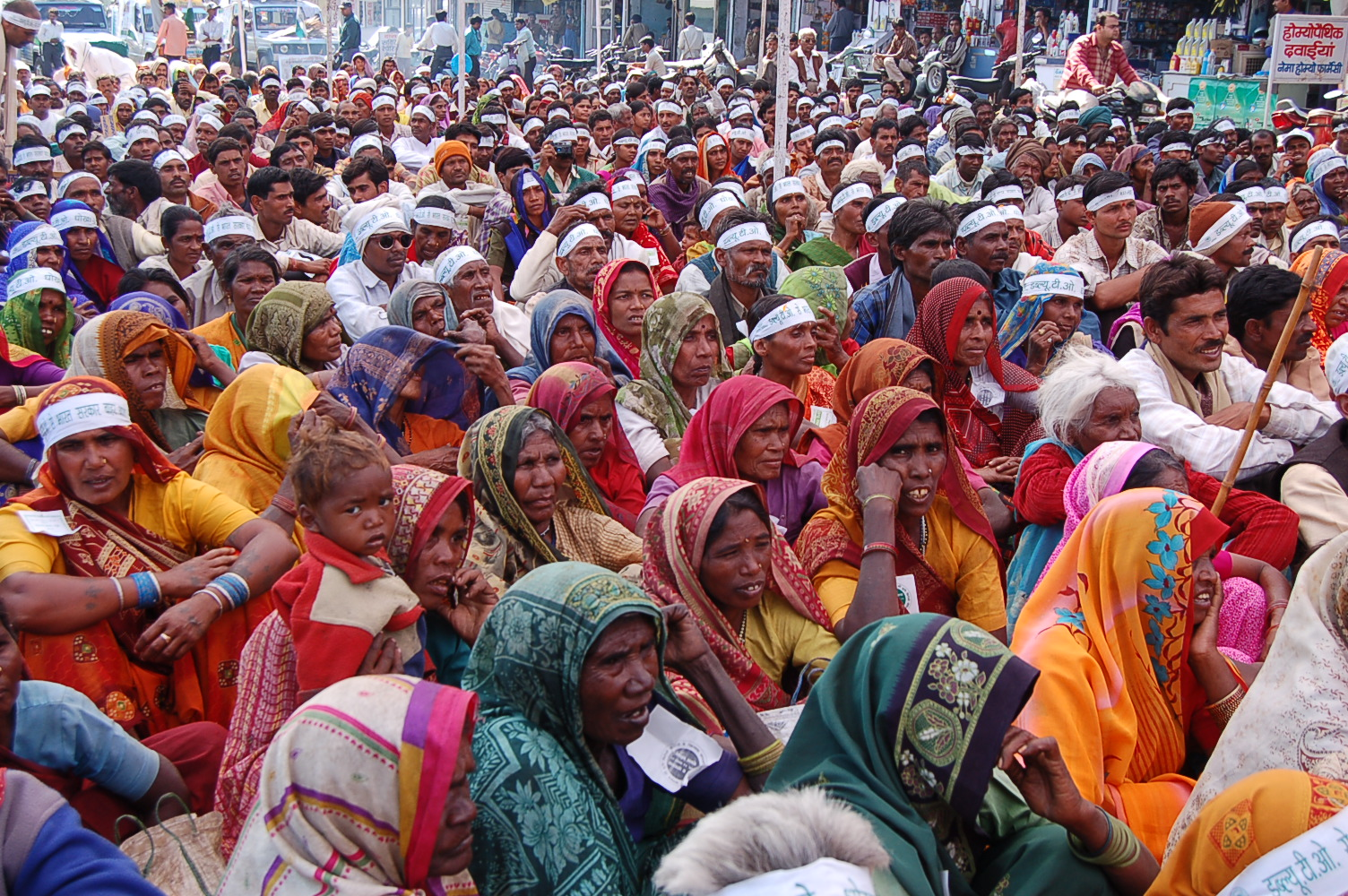
Women at farmers rally

The new wave of feminism in the 1970s was in response to gender inequality issues and stagnant development in India. The Committee on the Status of Women in India released a report in 1974, and had a significant influence in the re-emergence of activism towards gender equality. The report highlighted the significant differences between men and women in India, including the disparity in the sex ratio, mortality rates, employment, literacy, and wage discrimination. The report fuelled the women's movement by signifying the ongoing discrimination towards women in India. Gender inequality has remained the focus of the women's movement with specific emphasis on issues such as the Uniform Civil Code, Women's Reservation Bill, and sexual violence against women. Women's organisations, both informal and formal, have developed at the rural, urban, national, and state levels in India. Women's organisations in India address a variety of issues from the environment, poverty, empowerment, and violence against women. One of the most prominent women's organisations in India is the AIWC, which was established in 1927, focusing on empowering and educating Indian women. The AIWC has over 100,000 members and 500 branches in India, and has helped with the passage of the Sarda Act, Maternity Benefit Act, and Hindu Code Bills.

Indian women are significantly involved at the grassroots level of activism. The Chipko movement that arose in the 1970s is one example of success among the women's movement in India, as women protested the deforestation in Uttarakhand leading to the protection of the region. Since the Indian independence, women's organizations have focused on issues of violence towards women. Women's movements have focused on rape, female mortality rates, female foeticide, dowry deaths, sati, and domestic abuse. Tragedies such as the Mathura rape case in 1972, the dowry death of Tarvinder Kaur in 1979, the death of Roop Kanwar by practice of sati in 1987, the gang rape of Bhanwari Devi in 1992, and the New Delhi gang rape case in 2012, have kept the movement focused on rape and given rise to many women's organisations at the local and national level.

== Challenges to women's participation ==
The level and forms of women's participation in politics are largely influenced by cultural and societal barriers, including violence, discrimination, illiteracy, and financial challenges.

=== Sexual violence ===
Martha Nussbaum highlighted a significant barrier to women's capability of participation in politics to be the threat of violence. Sexual violence in India is exacerbated by issues of education and marriage. Women are sexually abused. Child marriage, domestic violence, and low literacy rates have lowered Indian women's economic opportunities and contributed to sexual violence in India. A 2011 study found, "24% of Indian men have committed sexual violence at some point in their lives, 20% have forced their partners to have sex with them...38% of men admitting they had physically abused their partners." Widespread sexual violence is attributed to the fact that violence within marriage is not against the law, and sexual violence goes largely unpunished. Martha C. Nussbaum states that "In the larger society, violence and the threat of violence affects many women's ability to participate actively in many forms of social and political relationship, to speak in public, to be recognised as dignified beings whose worth is equal to that of others."

=== Discrimination ===
Although the Constitution of India removed gender inequalities among caste and gender, discrimination continues to be a widespread barrier to women's political participation. A 2012 study of 3,000 Indian women found the barriers in participation, specifically in running for political office, in the form of illiteracy, work burdens within the household, and discriminatory attitudes towards women as leaders. Discriminatory attitudes manifest in the limitations presented to Indian women including low access to information and resources. Women rely on receiving information from family or village members, typically men. Women also lack leadership experience due to the fact that they are burdened with household duties. The burden of household duties is a significant reason why many Indian women do not participate. Unlike men, there are fewer opportunities for women to get involved in organizations to gain leadership skills. There is little public space for them as men have dominated the political arena for many years in India.

Discrimination is further perpetuated by class. Dalit women, of the lowest caste in India, are continually discriminated against in running for public office. The Government of India requires reservation of seats for Dalit and Scheduled Castes, but women suffer from abuse and discrimination when serving as elected officials. Dalit women experience harassment by being denied information, ignored or silenced in meetings, not getting entry in temples, and in some cases, petitioned to be removed from their elected position.

=== Illiteracy ===
India has the largest population of illiterate people. In January 2014, the United Nations reported that 25.6 percent of all adults in India are illiterate. Literacy among Indian women is 65.46%, which is much lower than literacy among men reported at 82.14%. illiteracy limits the ability of women to understand the political system and issues. Problems with exploitation, such as women being left off of voters' list, have been reported as illiteracy that limits the ability of women to ensure their political rights are exercised. Martial concerning political participation stated, "Because literacy is connected in general with the ability to move outside the home and to stand on one's own outside of it, it is also connected to the ability of women to meet and collaborate with other women." Studies conducted by Niraja Jayal and Nirmala Buch found women are "persistently mocked and devalued in the panchayats if they are illiterate." Nussbaum also found literacy can play a key role in the dignification and independence of women in politics by giving them access to communications, such as memos and newspapers, they can become better informed on political issues.

=== Financial challenges ===
Financial challenges significantly affect women's political participation in India. Many women, particularly in rural areas, face difficulties due to limited financial resources, which impact their ability to engage fully in political processes. Financial constraints can hinder women from attending Panchayat meetings or participating in political activities, as they may need to focus on earning a livelihood to support their families. Additionally, the lack of financial resources can prevent women from accessing necessary training and information related to political involvement. Studies have shown that financial instability can lead to women being less active in political roles and less able to advocate for their rights effectively. Addressing these financial barriers is crucial for enhancing women's participation and representation in local governance.

=== Overcoming barriers to participation ===
To overcome issues of discrimination and violence, women's organisations have focused on the empowerment of Indian women. Empowerment is tied to the support of family and improved status within the household, which is undermined by the threat of domestic and sexual violence. Socio-economic conditions, such as poverty and illiteracy, prevent the entrance of women into running for public office, and even voting. Inability to understand the rules of Panchayat Raj undermines the self-confidence to participate in public office. Empowerment of Indian women can also occur through "bridging gaps in education, renegotiating gender roles, the gender division of labour and addressing biased attitudes". Women can also be empowered to participate by family, and when familial support is present they are more likely to run for office.

The Government of India has addressed the issue of empowerment by consolidating all programs for women under the National Mission of Empowerment of Women (NMEW). The mission of NMEW is to "enhance economic empowerment of girls and women through skill development, micro credit, vocational training, and entrepreneurship." In 2001, the Government of India passed the National Policy for the Empowerment of Women. The policy focuses on "the advancement, development, and empowerment of women." Specifically, the policy focuses on ending gender inequality and violence against women. The United Nations has also encouraged empowerment among Indian women by campaigning to end violence against women in India.

== See also ==
- Nari Shakti Vandan Adhiniyam
- Women in India
- Women in government
- Women's suffrage
- Women's Reservation Bill (2010)
- Reserved political positions in India
- United Women Front
- All India Women's Conference
- Violence against women in India
- Domestic Violence in India
- Gender discrimination in India
- Gender inequality in India

=== Lists ===
- List of female chief ministers in India
- List of female governors and lieutenant governors in India
- List of female deputy chief ministers in India
