= 2026 TCS Nashik workplace harassment case =

Maharashtra, India investigation into TCS

In April 2026, a series of allegations involving sexual grooming, mental abuse, and forced religious conversion to Islam were reported at a Tata Consultancy Services (TCS) unit in Nashik, in Maharashtra, India.

In early 2026, multiple employees at the Tata Consultancy Services (TCS) - Business Process Outsourcing (BPO) campus in Nashik, Maharashtra, filed First Information Reports (FIRs) alleging sustained sexual harassment and religious coercion by several team leaders. The allegations, which reportedly span from 2022 to 2026, prompted the Nashik Police to form a Special Investigation Team (SIT).

A 23-year-old female Hindu victim described in her official statement to the police, that one of the four Muslim accused in the case made her watch Islamic Dawah videos of Pakistani cleric Tariq Jameel, under the guise of helping her reduce her mental stress in the workplace. The victim also claimed the accused attempted to manipulate her into thinking that converting to Islam would help reduce her mental stress and workplace pressure.

As part of the probe, six female police officers were deployed undercover as employees within the facility for 40 days to monitor workplace interactions and gather evidence. By mid-April 2026, authorities had registered nine FIRs and arrested seven employees, including several team leaders and an Assistant General Manager. The HR responsible for the Nashik office still remains unknown. The SIT investigation highlighted an alleged failure of the facility's internal grievance mechanisms. Police reported that the AGM was arrested for allegedly ignoring a verbal complaint, from one of the victims, thereby failing to trigger mandatory POSH (Prevention of Sexual Harassment) protocols.

The National Commission for Women (NCW) said its inquiry into allegations of sexual harassment and religious coercion at Tata Consultancy Services' Nashik unit has found instances of "pervasive sexual harassment" and "systemic bullying" as well as "zero compliance of the POSH Act" at the workplace. The report noted multiple instances of sexual harassment, attempted molestation and sustained mental abuse of employees. "No employee had the courage to raise their voice, and those who did so faced fear of professional repercussions including transfer and terminations", the NCW said.

TCS suspended the accused employees and initiated an investigation.
