= Vishakha and Others v. State of Rajasthan =

1997 Indian Supreme Court

Vishaka v. State of Rajasthan:
- Court: Supreme Court of India
- Full case name: Vishaka and Ors. v. State of Rajasthan and Ors.
- Decided: 13 August 1997
- Citation: AIR 1997 SC 3011

Case history
- Subsequent action: Superseded by The Sexual Harassment of Women at Workplace (Prevention, Prohibition and Redressal) Act, 2013 ("Sexual Harassment Act").

Court membership
- Judges sitting: J.S. Verma (Chief Justice), Sujata V. Manohar, B.N. Kirpal

Case opinions
- Decision by: J.S. Verma (Chief Justice)

Vishaka and Ors. v. State of Rajasthan was a 1997 Indian Supreme Court case where various women's groups led by Naina Kapur and her organisation, Sakshi, filed a Public Interest Litigation (PIL) petition against the state of Rajasthan and the central Government of India to enforce the fundamental rights of working women under Articles 14, 19 and 21 of the Constitution of India. The petition was filed after Bhanwari Devi, a social worker in Rajasthan, was brutally gang raped for stopping a child marriage.

The court decided that the consideration of "International Conventions and norms are significant for the purpose of interpretation of the guarantee of gender equality, right to work with human dignity in Articles 14, 15, 19(1)(g) and 21 of the Constitution and the safeguards against sexual harassment implicit therein." The petition resulted in what are popularly known as the Vishaka Guidelines. The judgment of August 1997 given by a bench of J. S. Verma (then Chief Justice of India), Sujata Manohar, and B. N. Kirpal, provided the basic definitions of sexual harassment at the workplace and provided guidelines to deal with it. It is seen as a significant legal victory for women's groups in India.

== Background ==
In India, before 1997, there were no formal guidelines for how an incident involving sexual harassment at workplace should be dealt by an employer. Women experiencing sexual harassment at workplace had to lodge a complaint under Section 354 of the Indian Penal Code that dealt with the 'criminal assault of women to outrage women's modesty' and Section 509 that punishes an individual or individuals for using a 'word, gesture or act intended to insult the modesty of a woman'. These sections left the interpretation of 'outraging women's modesty' to the discretion of the police officer.

During the 1990s, Rajasthan state government employee Bhanwari Devi who tried to prevent child marriage as part of her duties as a worker of the Women Development Programme was raped by the landlords of the Gujjar community. The feudal patriarchs who were enraged by her (in their words: "a lowly woman from a poor and potter community") 'guts' decided to teach her a lesson and raped her repeatedly. The rape survivor did not get justice from Rajasthan High Court and the rapists were allowed to go free. This inspired several women’s groups and non-governmental organizations to file a petition in the Supreme Court under the collective platform of Vishaka

This case brought to the attention of the Supreme Court of India "the absence of domestic law occupying the field, to formulate effective measures to check the evil of sexual harassment of working women at all work places."

== Judgement ==
In 1997, the Supreme Court laid down guidelines in the Vishakha case, pending formal legislation, for dealing with sexual harassment of women at the workplace.

In 1997, the Supreme Court delivered a landmark judgment laying down guidelines to be followed by establishments in dealing with complaints about sexual harassment. "Vishaka Guidelines" were stipulated by the Supreme Court of India, in Vishaka and others v State of Rajasthan case in 1997, regarding sexual harassment at workplace. The court stated that these guidelines were to be implemented until legislation is passed to deal with the issue.

The court decided that the consideration of "International Conventions and norms are significant for the purpose of interpretation of the guarantee of gender equality, right to work with human dignity in Articles 14, 15 19(1)(g) and 21 of the Constitution and the safeguards against sexual harassment implicit therein."

The court also defined sexual harassment as including such unwelcome sexually determined behaviour (whether directly or by implication) like physical contact and advances, a demand or request for sexual favours, sexually coloured remarks, showing pornography, or any other unwelcome physical verbal or non-verbal conduct of sexual nature. The court recognised that where any of these acts is committed in circumstances where under the victim of such conduct has a reasonable apprehension that in relation to the victim’s employment or work whether she is drawing salary, or honorarium or voluntary, whether in government, public or private enterprise such conduct can be humiliating and may constitute a health and safety problem. The court noted that it was discriminatory when the woman has reasonable grounds to believe that objecting to sexual harassment would disadvantage her in connection with her employment or work including recruiting or promotion or when it creates a hostile work environment. Thus, sexual harassment need not involve physical contact. Any act that creates a hostile work environment — be it by virtue of cracking lewd jokes, verbal abuse, circulating lewd rumours etc. — counts as sexual harassment. The creation of a hostile work environment through unwelcome physical verbal or non-verbal conduct of sexual nature may consist not of a single act but of pattern of behaviour comprising many such acts.

Noting that in some cases, the psychological stigma of reporting the conduct of a co-worker might require a great deal of courage on the part of the victim and they may report such acts after a long period of time. The guidelines suggest that the compliance mechanism should ensure time-bound treatment of complaints, but they do not suggest that a report can only be made within a short period of time since the incident occurred. Often, the police refuse to lodge FIRs for sexual harassment cases, especially where the harassment occurred some time ago.

== Subsequent legislation ==
The Supreme Court of India's judgement only proposed guidelines to alleviate the problem of sexual harassment in 1997. India finally enacted its law on prevention of sexual harassment against female employees at the workplace. The Sexual Harassment of Women at Workplace (Prevention, Prohibition and Redressal) Act, 2013 ("Sexual Harassment Act") has been made effective on 23 April 2013 by way of publication in the Gazette of India.

== See also ==
- Bhanwari Devi
- The Sexual Harassment of Women at Workplace (Prevention, Prohibition and Redressal) Act, 2013
