= Article 51 =

Article 51 may refer to:

- Chapter VII of the United Nations Charter#Article 51: Self-defence
- Fourth Geneva Convention#Article 51: Recruitment of Protected persons
- Article 51 of the Constitution of India, for promoting international peace and security
