= Special session =

Period when a legislative body convenes outside of normal sessions

In a legislature, a special session (also extraordinary session) is a period when the body convenes outside of the normal legislative session. This most frequently occurs in order to complete unfinished tasks for the year (often delayed by conflict between political parties), such as outlining the government's budget for the next fiscal year, biennium, or other period. Special sessions may also be called during an economic downturn in order to cut the budget. In other cases, a special session may be convened to address special topics, or emergencies such as war or natural disaster.

Who calls a special session varies – by vote of the legislature during regular session, by the executive, or by the legislature's speaker or presiding officer. The United Nations has both special sessions and emergency special sessions.

== United States ==
In the United States of America, Article II, Section 3 of the United States Constitution gives the president of the United States the power to "on extraordinary occasions, convene both Houses or either of them."

This power exists for urgent or extraordinary situations that require congressional action when Congress is adjourned. Presidents have exercised this power 46 times to recall only the Senate and 28 times to recall both Chambers of Congress, most recently by Harry Truman in 1948.

The Senate itself differentiates between "extraordinary sessions" called by the presidential proclamation and "special sessions" that merely indicate a session not normally scheduled. The term "session" can refer to either the formal start and end of a Congressional session or the daily sessions of the chambers of Congress. Thus a formal "special session" will only happen when Congress has adjourned sine die and is not simply in recess (in other words Congress may or may not already be in an official session, but in recess, when convened).

In every US state special sessions may also be called, but in some states the power rests solely with the governor. These states are Alabama, Arkansas, California, Indiana, Kentucky, Michigan, Minnesota, Mississippi, North Dakota, Rhode Island, South Carolina, Texas, and Vermont. In the other 37 states the governor and legislature have the power to call a special session.

== India ==
The president of India is authorized to convene Parliament at their discretion, with no more than six months between sessions. Legislative body can be summoned for the special session of the Parliament of India under the same provision.

== See also ==
- Joint session
