= Property Owners Association v. State of Maharashtra =

2024 Supreme Court of India case

- Court: Supreme Court of India
- Decided: 5 November 2024
- Docket nos.: W.P. (C) No. 934/1992

Court membership
- Judges sitting: D.Y. Chandrachud, Hrishikesh Roy, B.V. Nagarathna, Sudhanshu Dhulia, J. B. Pardiwala, Manoj Misra, Rajesh Bindal, S.C. Sharma, A.G. Masih
- Chief judge: D. Y. Chandrachud

Case opinions
- Decision by: D. Y. Chandrachud
- Majority: 8

Property Owners Association v. State of Maharashtra, W.P. (Civil) No. 934/1992, is a judgement of the Supreme Court of India that unanimously held that not all private property can be considered the "material resources of the community" under the Article 39(b) of the Constitution of India, a Directive Principal of State Policy that mandates the state to create policies ensuring the ownership and control of the community's material resources are distributed to best serve the common good.

The case was decided by a majority of 8:1 by a nine-judge constitution bench led by Chief Justice of India (CJI) D. Y. Chandrachud who authored the majority opinion. Justice Dhulia wrote the dissent.

The ruling is a landmark judgement that curtailed state's control over private resources and balancing that with individual rights and private wealth acquisition.
