= Reserved political positions in India =

Aspect of apportionment of political offices and university posts in India

In India, a number of political positions and university posts are held for specific groups of the population, including Scheduled Castes (SC) and Scheduled Tribes (ST), and women in some cases.

There are reserved constituencies both Parliamentary and State Assembly elections. Scheduled Castes (usually abbreviated as SC), and Scheduled Tribes (usually abbreviated as ST) are castes and tribes included in the schedules published by the government to indicate these castes' and tribes' backward status. All voters, including Non-SC, Non-ST community voters, have the right to vote for these candidates belonging to SC or ST candidate, if contesting from their constituency. About 25% of Indian population belongs to SC/ST communities. About the same ratio of seats are reserved for them in the Parliament. In each state, that number will depend on the percentage of population and percentage of SC/ST amongst them. In local body elections, like municipal polls, in addition to SC/ST, other Backward Class candidates also have reserved seats. The constituencies are allotted by lottery system. In the case of municipal and other local elections, the constituencies are known as wards. Thus, there may be as many wards or constituencies as the number of elected seats in the elected body. Reserved constituencies are constituencies in which seats are reserved for Scheduled Castes and Tribes based on the size of their population.

In the earlier history of India under British rule, a separate electorate meant that not only were the seats reserved for a specific group, but voting for the reserved constituency was allowed for only members of that specific community. For example, only Muslims could vote for Muslim candidates in Muslim reserved constituencies.

== Definition ==
An electorate is a group of voters encompassing all the officially qualified voters within a particular country or area or for a particular election. A joint electorate is one where the entire voting population of a country or region is part of a single electorate and the entire electorate votes for the candidates who contest in the elections.

In the case of separate electorates, the voting population of a country or region is divided into different electorates, based on certain factors such as religion, caste, gender, and occupation. Here, members of each electorate vote only for elected representatives for their electorate. Separate electorates are usually demanded by minorities who feel it would otherwise be difficult for them to get fair representation in government. For example, a separate electorate for Muslims means that Muslims will choose their separate leader by separate elections for Muslims. The Constitution of India entitles every citizen to elect representatives. The constitution-makers, however, were worried that open electoral competition would preclude less populous minority groups from election to the national and the state legislative assemblies.

== Under British rule ==
In India's pre-independence era, in 1906, Muslims demanded extra-proportional representation to seek parity with Hindus in sharing power with the British government; the British government provided for a separate electorate system to the Muslims in the Indian Councils Act 1909. As a result, of the total 250 seats of the Bengal Legislative Assembly, 117 seats were reserved for Muslims. Accordingly, the general elections of 1937 were held based on the extended separate electorates, where only Muslims voted for the 117 seats, in Bengal. The system of separate electorates encouraged sectarian competition, sowing the seeds of the Pakistan movement.

Again, in the Round Table Conferences in 1930–32, the concept of separate electorates for the Untouchables (SC) was raised by B. R. Ambedkar as a way to ensure sufficient representation for the minority SC communities in the government. This provision was strongly opposed by Gandhi because he believed the move would disintegrate Hindu society. If the SC communities were given a separate electorate, then certain constituencies would have been reserved for them, and only the people belonging to SC communities would have been able to vote for candidates contesting those seats, thus alienating the rest of the Hindus. Eventually, a compromise was reached between Ambedkar and Gandhi with the Poona Pact, in which the parties agreed that certain constituencies would be reserved for the SC communities, where the people belonging to SC communities could elect four candidates per constituency who would then be candidates for election by the joint electorate.

== Groups with reserved seats ==
=== Anglo-Indians ===
The Anglo-Indian community was the only community in India that had its representatives nominated to the Lok Sabha (lower house) in the Parliament of India. This right was secured from Jawaharlal Nehru by Frank Anthony, the first and longtime president of the All India Anglo-Indian Association. The President nominated two Anglo-Indian members to the Lok Sabha. Fourteen states (Andhra Pradesh, Bihar, Chhattisgarh, Gujarat, Jharkhand, Karnataka, Kerala, Madhya Pradesh, Maharashtra, Telangana, Tamil Nadu, Uttar Pradesh, Uttarakhand and West Bengal) also had a nominated member each in their respective State Legislative Assemblies.

Article 334 of the Indian Constitution gave reservation to the Anglo-Indian community. It was originally set to expire 20 years after the commencement of the Constitution, but was extended multiple times through constitutional amendments: to 1970 through the 5th Amendment, to 1980 through the 23rd Amendment, to 1990 through the 45th Amendment, to 2006 through the 62nd Amendment, to 2010 through the 79th Amendment, and to 2020 through the 95th Amendment. In January 2020, the Anglo-Indian reserved seats in the Parliament and State Legislatures of India were abolished by the 104th Constitutional Amendment Act of 2019. The reason cited by the Central Law Minister Ravi Shankar Prasad who introduced the Bill in the Lok Sabha was that the Anglo-Indian population in India was just 296 in the 2011 Census of India, though the number is disputed. The total number of Anglo-Indians is disputed with estimates up to 150,000. Some sources suggest a population between 75,000 and 100,000.

=== Scheduled Castes and Scheduled Tribes ===
Map of reserved Lok Sabha constituency of India

Several seats in the Parliament of India, State Assemblies, urban and rural-level institutions are reserved for Scheduled Castes (SC) and Scheduled Tribes (ST). These reserved seats are elected by all voters in a constituency, without a separate electorate. A member of an SC/ST is not debarred from contesting a general (i.e. non-reserved) seat. This system was introduced by the Constitution of India in 1950 and was supposed to be in place for the first 10 years, to ensure participation in politics by these groups which were deemed weak, marginalized, under-represented and needing special protection. Under the 104th amendment to the Constitution of India, this reservation is to last until 2030 and is subject to extension with another constitutional amendment.

The population figure of SCs in relation to the total population figure had increased from 14.6% in the 1971 census to 16.2% in the 2001 census. Similarly, the population figure of STs had increased from 6.9% in the 1971 census to 8.2% in the 2001 census. The overall increase in the population of SCs and STs in the 2001 census has led the Delimitation Commission to increase the seats for Scheduled castes in Lok Sabha from 79 to 84 and for Scheduled Tribes from 41 to 47 out of 543 constituencies, as per the Delimitation of Parliamentary and Assembly Constituencies Order of 2008.

Allocation of seats for Scheduled Castes and Scheduled Tribes in the Lok Sabha are made based on the proportion of Scheduled Castes and Scheduled Tribes in the state based on the state's population, as per Article 330 of the Constitution of India read with Section 3 of the Representation of the People Act of 1951.

=== Other Backward Classes ===
As per the enforcement of recommendations of the Mandal Commission, the Other Backward Classes (OBCs) also receive reserved seats in the Rural and Urban bodies election.

Allocation of seats for Other Backward Classes are made based on the proportion of Other Backward Classes relative to the total state population.

=== Women ===
Women get one-third reservation in Gram Panchayats (meaning 'Village Council', which is a form of local rural government), Block Panchayats, District Councils and Municipal bodies. There is a long-term plan to extend this reservation to the Parliament and State Legislature.

The Women's Reservation Bill of 2010 proposed 33% of all seats in Lok Sabha and all State Legislative assemblies for women. It was passed in Rajya Sabha on 2010. But was never voted on in the Lok Sabha. In 2023 September, a similar bill Women's Reservation Bill, proposed to reserve 1/3 of all seats in Lok Sabha, and in all state legislative assemblies for women. It was passed in both Lok Sabha and Rajya Sabha becoming a law.

Between 1957 and 2019, before the abrogation of Article 370 and 35A of the Constitution of India, the former 89-member Jammu and Kashmir Legislative Assembly had 2 seats reserved for the nominated women members. But after the passing of Women's Reservation Bill, 2023 it became 33%. Additionally, the Lieutenant Governor may nominate two representatives of Kashmiri migrant families to the assembly, one of which is reserved for woman.

=== Sangha and Bhutia-Lepcha seats in Sikkim ===
Sikkim was merged with India in 1975. The 32-member Sikkim Legislative Assembly has one seat reserved for a Buddhist Sangha member. Only Buddhist monks and nuns belonging to the 111 registered Buddhist monasteries are eligible to vote and stand for this seat. Additionally, 12 seats in the Sikkim Legislative Assembly are reserved for the Bhutia-Lepcha ethnic people.

== Other reserved seats ==
Some seats, rather than being reserved for specific groups, are chosen by other branches of the government.

=== Central government's nominees to the Puducherry Legislative Assembly ===
In the 33-member Puducherry Legislative Assembly, 3 members are nominated by the Central government of India.

=== Governor's nominees to the State Legislative Councils ===
A Governor can nominate up to 1/6 of the total number of members in a State Legislative council, the upper house of the state legislature in 6 states, Andhra Pradesh, Bihar, Karnataka, Maharashtra, Telangana and Uttar Pradesh. These members are experts in the fields of art, science, literature and social service.

=== President's nominees to the Rajya Sabha ===
The President of India can nominate 12 members to the Rajya Sabha. These 12 members are people who have expertise in art, science, literature and social service.

== See also ==
- Nari Shakti Vandan Adhiniyam
- Reserved political positions
- Proportionate representation
