= 2009 Indian general election in Delhi =

Delhi 2009 election: May 7

Indian general election in National Capital Territory of Delhi, 2009
- 7 May 2009

7 seats
- Turnout: 51.86%
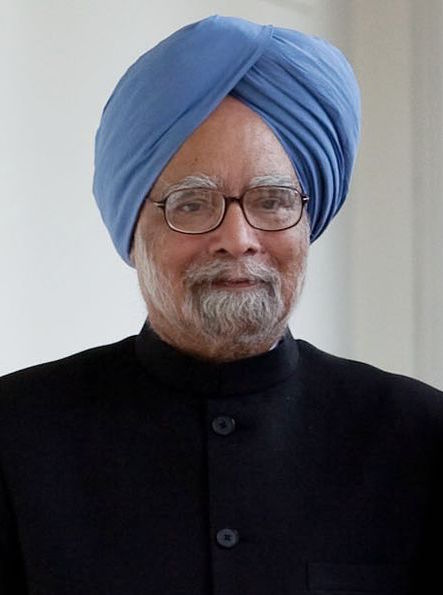

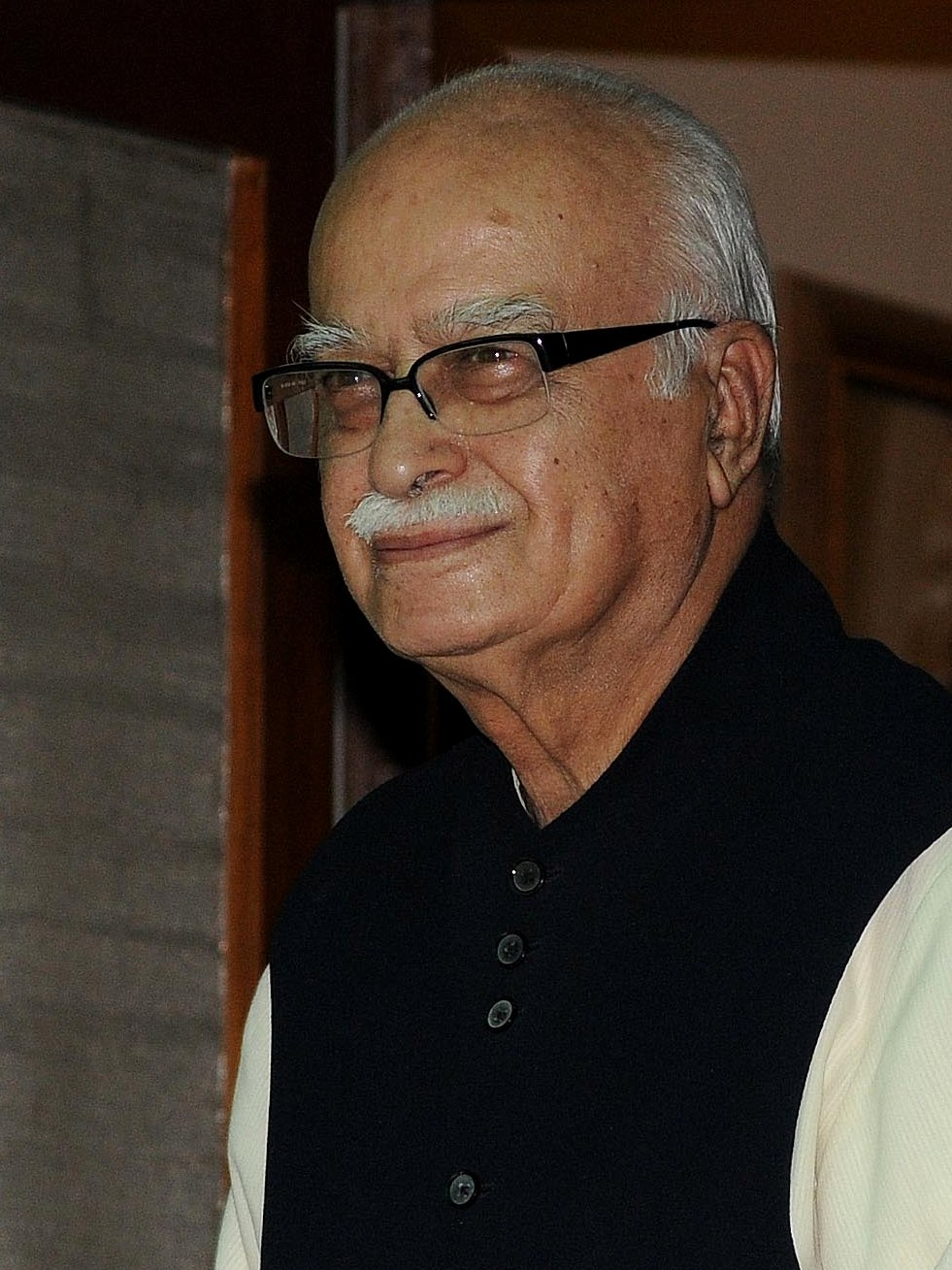
| | First party | Second party |
|---|---|---|
| Leader | Manmohan Singh | L. K. Advani |
| Party | INC | BJP |
| Seats won | 7 | 0 |
| Seat change | ▲1 | ▼1 |
| Popular vote | 3,285,353 | 2,026,876 |
| Percentage | 57.11% | 35.23% |
| Swing | ▲2.31pp | ▼5.43pp |
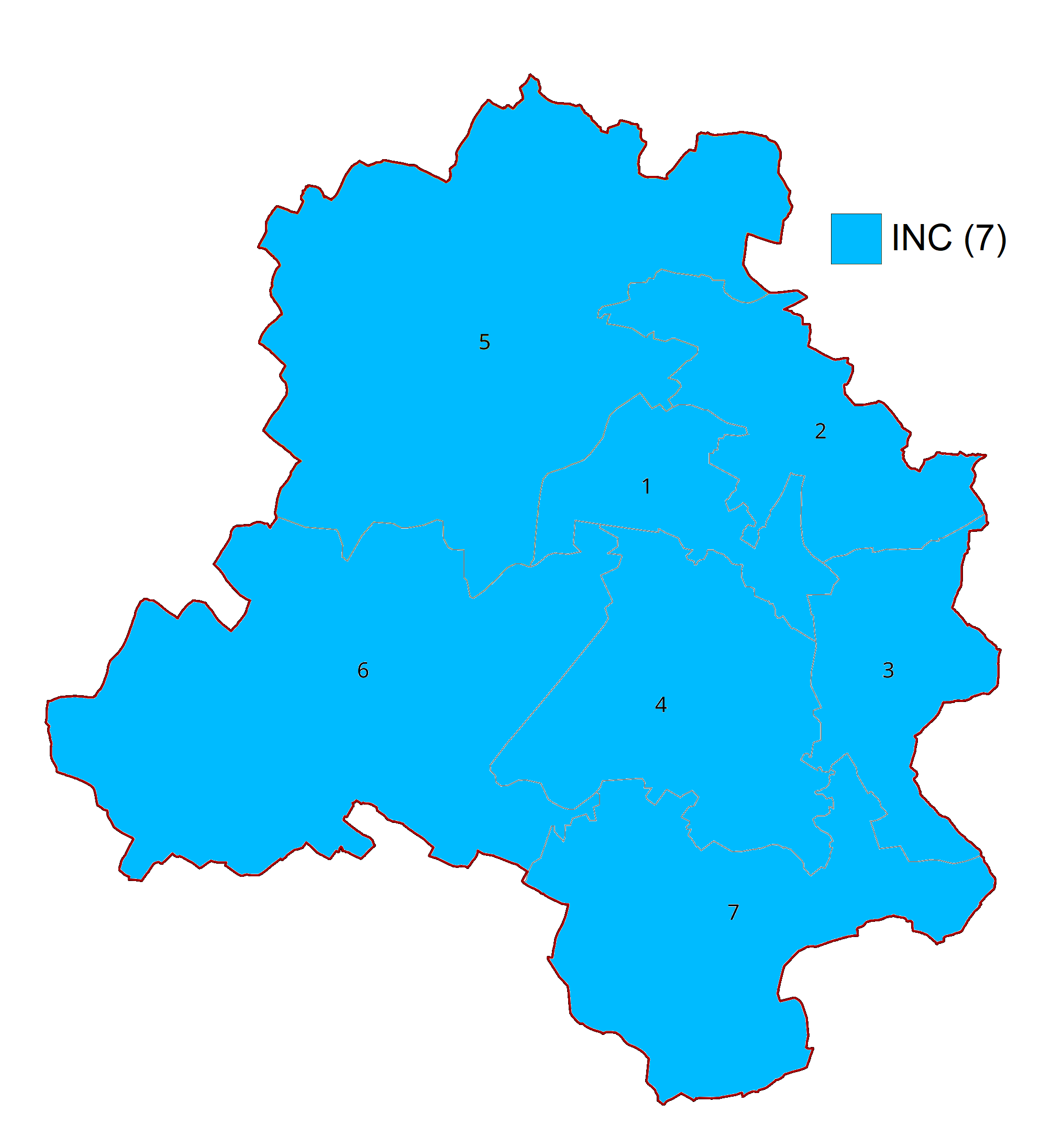
- Delhi
Prime Minister before election
Manmohan Singh
INC
Prime Minister after election
Manmohan Singh
INC

The 2009 Indian general election in Delhi was held on 7 May 2009 to elect representatives of the 7 parliamentary constituencies in the union territory.

The Indian National Congress won all the 7 seats of Delhi in the Lok Sabha, making it the third time it won all the seats in Delhi since 1952.

== Parties and alliances ==
=== National Democratic Alliance ===
| No. | Party | Flag | Symbol | Leader | Seats contested |
|---|---|---|---|---|---|
| 1. | Bharatiya Janata Party | | | L. K. Advani | 7 |

=== United Progressive Alliance ===
| No. | Party | Flag | Symbol | Leader | Seats contested |
|---|---|---|---|---|---|
| 1. | Indian National Congress | | | Manmohan Singh | 7 |

== Results ==
| Party | Seats | | Votes | |
| Party | Contested | Won | # | % |
|---|---|---|---|---|
| Indian National Congress | 7 | 7 | 3,285,353 | 57.11 |
| Bharatiya Janata Party | 7 | 0 | 2,026,876 | 35.23 |
| Bahujan Samaj Party | 7 | 0 | 307,232 | 5.34 |
| Samajwadi Party | 7 | 0 | 16,357 | 0.28 |
| Communist Party of India | 1 | 0 | 5,244 | 0.09 |
| Bharatiya Sampuran Krantikari Party | 5 | 0 | 4,713 | 0.08 |
| Lokdal | 1 | 0 | 3,157 | 0.05 |
| Rashtriya Krantikari Samajwadi Party | 1 | 0 | 2,887 | 0.05 |
| Ambedkar Samaj Party | 1 | 0 | 2,605 | 0.05 |
| Bharatiya Sarvodaya Kranti Party | 1 | 0 | 2,173 | 0.04 |
| United Women Front | 2 | 0 | 2,151 | 0.04 |
| Youth For Equality | 1 | 0 | 2,099 | 0.04 |
| Indian Justice Party | 2 | 0 | 2,074 | 0.04 |
| Rashtravadi Janata Party | 2 | 0 | 1,950 | 0.03 |
| Hindu Mahasabha | 3 | 0 | 1,850 | 0.03 |
| All India Forward Bloc | 1 | 0 | 1,682 | 0.03 |
| Bharat Punarnirmal Dal | 3 | 0 | 1,570 | 0.03 |
| Rashtriya Krantikari Janata Party | 2 | 0 | 1,569 | 0.03 |
| Republican Party of India | 3 | 0 | 1,551 | 0.03 |
| Communist Party of India (Marxist–Leninist) Liberation | 1 | 0 | 1,439 | 0.03 |
| Bhartiya Pragatisheel Congress | 3 | 0 | 1,372 | 0.02 |
| All India Bahujan Samman Party | 1 | 0 | 1,217 | 0.02 |
| Republican Party of India Ektavadi | 2 | 0 | 1,056 | 0.02 |
| Matra Bhakta Party | 2 | 0 | 1,006 | 0.02 |
| Jai Bharat Party | 1 | 0 | 836 | 0.01 |
| Nelopa | 1 | 0 | 793 | 0.01 |
| Shiv Sena | 1 | 0 | 649 | 0.01 |
| Adarshwadi Dal | 1 | 0 | 614 | 0.01 |
| Rashtrawadi Sena | 1 | 0 | 609 | 0.01 |
| Yuva Vikas Party | 1 | 0 | 595 | 0.01 |
| Desh Bhakt Party | 2 | 0 | 531 | 0.01 |
| Rashtrawadi Labour Party | 1 | 0 | 515 | 0.01 |
| Jammu and Kashmir National Panthers Party | 1 | 0 | 486 | 0.01 |
| Lokpriya Samaj Party | 1 | 0 | 478 | 0.01 |
| Rashtriya Dehat Morcha Party | 1 | 0 | 454 | 0.01 |
| Rashtriya Janadhikar Party | 1 | 0 | 434 | 0.01 |
| Jharkhand Mukti Morcha | 1 | 0 | 405 | 0.01 |
| The Humanist Party of India | 1 | 0 | 358 | 0.01 |
| Loktantrik Janata Party | 1 | 0 | 351 | 0.01 |
| Samajwadi Janata Party | 1 | 0 | 345 | 0.01 |
| Ambedkar National Congress | 1 | 0 | 322 | 0.01 |
| Bharatiya Gaon Taj Dal | 1 | 0 | 301 | 0.01 |
| Revolutionary Socialist Party | 1 | 0 | 289 | 0.01 |
| Janata Dal | 1 | 0 | 266 | 0.00 |
| Pyramid Party of India | 1 | 0 | 230 | 0.00 |
| Buddhiviveki Vikas Party | 1 | 0 | 186 | 0.00 |
| Independent | N/A | 0 | 62,817 | 1.09 |
| Total | | 7 | 5,753,733 | 100.0 |

=== List of elected MPs ===
| Constituency | | Winner | | | | Runner-up | | | | Margin | |
| Constituency | | Candidate | Party | Votes | % | Candidate | Party | Votes | % | Votes | % |
|---|---|---|---|---|---|---|---|---|---|---|---|
| 1 | Chandni Chowk | Kapil Sibal ★ | INC | 465,713 | 59.67 | Vijender Gupta | BJP | 265,003 | 33.96 | 200,710 | 25.71 |
| 2 | North East Delhi | Jai Prakash Agarwal | INC | 518,191 | 59.03 | B. L. Sharma Prem | BJP | 295,948 | 33.71 | 222,243 | 25.32 |
| 3 | East Delhi | Sandeep Dikshit ★ | INC | 518,001 | 60.41 | Chetan Chauhan | BJP | 276,948 | 32.30 | 241,053 | 28.11 |
| 4 | New Delhi | Ajay Maken ★ | INC | 455,867 | 59.59 | Vijay Goel | BJP | 268,058 | 35.04 | 187,809 | 24.55 |
| 5 | North West Delhi | Krishna Tirath ★ | INC | 487,404 | 56.84 | Meera Kanwaria | BJP | 302,971 | 35.33 | 184,433 | 21.51 |
| 6 | West Delhi | Mahabal Mishra | INC | 479,899 | 54.32 | Prof. Jagdish Mukhi | BJP | 350,889 | 39.72 | 129,010 | 14.60 |
| 7 | South Delhi | Ramesh Kumar | INC | 360,278 | 49.27 | Ramesh Bidhuri | BJP | 267,059 | 36.52 | 93,219 | 12.75 |

- ★ indicates sitting MP winning again

== Post-election Union Council of Ministers from NCT Delhi ==
| # | Name | Constituency | Designation | Department | From | To | Party |
|---|---|---|---|---|---|---|---|
| 1 | Kapil Sibal | Chandni Chowk | Cabinet Minister | Human Resource Development | 28 May 2009 | 28 October 2012 | INC |
| 1 | Kapil Sibal | Chandni Chowk | Cabinet Minister | Science and Technology; Earth Sciences | 10 November 2010 | 19 January 2011 | INC |
| 1 | Kapil Sibal | Chandni Chowk | Cabinet Minister | Communications and Information Technology | 15 November 2010 | 26 May 2014 | INC |
| 1 | Kapil Sibal | Chandni Chowk | Cabinet Minister | Law and Justice | 11 May 2013 | 26 May 2014 | INC |
| 2 | Krishna Tirath | North West Delhi | MoS (I/C) | Women and Child Development | 28 May 2009 | 26 May 2014 | INC |
| 3 | Ajay Maken | New Delhi | MoS | Home Affairs | 28 May 2009 | 19 January 2011 | INC |
| 3 | Ajay Maken | New Delhi | MoS (I/C) | Youth Affairs and Sports | 19 January 2011 | 28 October 2012 | INC |
| 3 | Ajay Maken | New Delhi | Cabinet Minister | Housing and Urban Poverty Alleviation | 28 October 2012 | 15 June 2013 | INC |

== Assembly segment wise lead of parties ==
| Party | Assembly segments | Position in Assembly (as of 2008 election) |
|---|---|---|
| Indian National Congress | 68 | 43 |
| Bharatiya Janata Party | 2 | 23 |
| Total | 70 | |
