= Eighty-sixth Amendment of the Constitution of India =

The Constitution (Eighty-sixth Amendment) Act, 2002

Parliament of India
- Long title: An Act further to amend the Constitution of India.
- Citation: 86th Amendment Act of the Indian Constitution
- Territorial extent: India
- Assented to: 12 December 2002
- Bill citation: Constitution (93rd Amendment) Bill, 2002
- Status: In force

The Eighty-sixth Amendment of the Constitution of India, provides Right to Education for the age of six to fourteen years and Early childhood care until the age of six. It has inserted Article 21A (Right to Education as a Fundamental Right ) & replaces Article 45 (Early Childhood Education) of Directive principles of State policy and amended Article 51A (Fundamental Duties) to add new duty of parents for providing education to his child between the age of six and fourteen years.

== Text ==
BE it enacted by Parliament in the Fifty-third Year of the Republic of India as follows:-

1. Short title and commencement:

(1) This Act may be called the Constitution (Eighty-sixth Amendment) Act, 2002.

(2) It shall come into force on such date as the Central Government may, by notification in the Official Gazette, appoint.

2. Insertion of new article 21A:

After article 21 of the Constitution, the following article shall be inserted, namely:-

Right to education.-

"21A. The State shall provide free and compulsory education to all children of the age of six to fourteen years in such manner as the State may, by law, determine.".

3. Substitution of new article for article 45:-

For article 45 of the Constitution, the following article shall be substituted, namely:- .

Provision for early childhood care and education to children below the age of six years.

"45. The State shall endeavour to provide early childhood care and education for all children until they complete the age of six years.".

4. Amendment of article 51A:

In article 51A of the Constitution, after clause (J), the following clause shall be added, namely:-

"(k) who is a parent or guardian to provide opportunities for education to his child or, as the case may be, ward between the age of six and fourteen years."

The full text of Article 45 of the Constitution, after the 86th Amendment, is given below:

~~45. Provision for free and compulsory education for children:~~

~~The State shall endeavour to provide, within a period of ten years from the commencement of this Constitution, for free and compulsory education for all children until they complete the age of fourteen years.~~

45. Provision for early childhood care and education to children below the age of six years:

The State shall endeavour to provide early childhood care and education for all children until they complete the age of six years.
