= Article 51 of the Constitution of India =

Commits India to promoting international peace and security

Article 51 of the Constitution of India is a directive principle of state policy enshrined in Part IV of the Constitution of India. It reflects India's commitment to international peace and cooperation, and outlines the guiding principles for the country's foreign policy objectives.

== Background ==
On 29 November 1948, the Constituent Assembly debated the first version of Article 51 as Article 40 of the revised Draft Constitution, 1948. Draft Article 40 read:

The State shall promote international peace and security by the prescription of open, just and honourable relations between nations, by the firm establishment of the understandings of international law as the actual rule of conduct among governments and by the maintenance of justice and respect for treaty obligations in the dealings of organised people with one another.

== Part IV: Directive Principles of State Policy ==
Part IV of the Constitution of India contains the Directive Principles of State Policy. These principles are non-justiciable in nature, meaning they are not enforceable by the courts, but serve as guidelines for the government in making laws and policies. The Directive Principles aim to promote social justice, economic welfare, and the overall well-being of the citizens.

=== Article 51: Promotion of international peace and security ===
The State shall endeavour to—

(a) promote international peace and security;

(b) maintain just and honourable relations between nations;

(c) foster respect for international law and treaty obligations in the dealings of organised peoples with one another; and

(d) encourage settlement of international disputes by arbitration.

== Purpose ==
Article 51 of the Constitution of India, found within Part IV, emphasizes the importance of international peace and cooperation. It states that the State shall strive to foster respect for international law and treaty obligations in the conduct of its affairs. Indirectly, this encourages the promotion of the principles of the United Nations Charter also.

The principles outlined in Article 51 have significant implications for India's foreign policy. It emphasizes the State's commitment to adhere to international law, respect treaties and agreements, and this encourages India to uphold the principles enshrined in the United Nations Charter. It also includes the peaceful settlement of disputes, non-interference in the internal affairs of other nations, and the promotion of human rights.

Article 51 further emphasizes the renunciation of war as an instrument of national policy and encourages the State to work towards the maintenance of peaceful relations with other countries. It urges India to cooperate with other nations in matters of mutual interest, such as economic development, social progress, and the advancement of human knowledge.

== Proposed Amendments ==
In year 1978, Constitution (Amendment) Bill was set in motion in the parliament by Shri Hari Vishnu Kamath, aiming to amend the Article 51 by incorporating a new sub-clause:

(e) collaborate with other nations for the early formation of a World Constituent Assembly to draft the Constitution for a world federal Government.

He argued that this amendment would bestow a genuine meaning upon Article 51, allowing India to take a leading role in the establishment of a World Government.

== Judicial interpretation ==
Although the Directive Principles of State Policy are not enforceable by any court under Article 37 of the Constitution, courts have relied upon them as interpretive aids in defining the relationship between international law and Indian domestic law. Article 51(c), in particular, has been invoked in judicial decisions concerning treaties, customary international law and India's international obligations.

The Supreme Court clarified the distinction between treaty-making and treaty implementation in Maganbhai Ishwarbhai Patel v. Union of India. The case arose from the implementation of the Rann of Kutch arbitral award between India and Pakistan. The Court held that the Union executive has the power to enter into international agreements under Article 73 of the Constitution. It further held that implementation of such agreements in domestic law may require legislative action under Article 253, particularly where an agreement requires modification of existing municipal law or affects rights enforceable within India. Where implementation of an international agreement involves the cession of Indian territory, the Court held that a constitutional amendment under Article 368 is required, following the principle established in In re: Berubari Union and Exchange of Enclaves.

The Court reaffirmed this principle in Jolly George Varghese v. Bank of Cochin, which concerned the enforcement of a decree in light of India's obligations under the International Covenant on Civil and Political Rights. The Court, per Krishna Iyer J., observed that India's status as a signatory to the Covenant, read with Article 51(c), created an obligation on the State to promote respect for international law and treaty commitments. The Court held, however, that the Covenant could not override existing municipal law in the absence of implementing legislation.

The relationship between international law and municipal law was further addressed in Gramophone Company of India Ltd. v. Birendra Bahadur Pandey. The Court held that principles of international law may be read into domestic law without express legislative sanction, provided they do not conflict with an Act of Parliament. Where such a conflict exists, the Court held that municipal law prevails over international law.

The Court subsequently relied on Article 51(c) in Vishaka v. State of Rajasthan. In the absence of legislation governing workplace sexual harassment, the Court referred to the Convention on the Elimination of All Forms of Discrimination against Women (CEDAW) in formulating binding guidelines. The Court grounded this approach in Article 51(c), read with Article 253 and Entry 14 of the Union List, holding that international conventions may inform constitutional interpretation where domestic law is silent and the conventions are not inconsistent with existing domestic law.

Legal commentators have characterised this line of decisions as reflecting a qualified dualist approach to the relationship between international law and Indian domestic law, under which treaty obligations do not become directly enforceable without implementing legislation, but may nonetheless inform judicial interpretation where domestic law is silent and no conflict with municipal law arises.

== Criticism ==
While Article 51 reflects India's commitment to international peace and cooperation, India has faced criticism for its marginal engagement with international law.
