= 17th Lok Sabha =

Lower House members elected in 2019

←	16th	18th	→
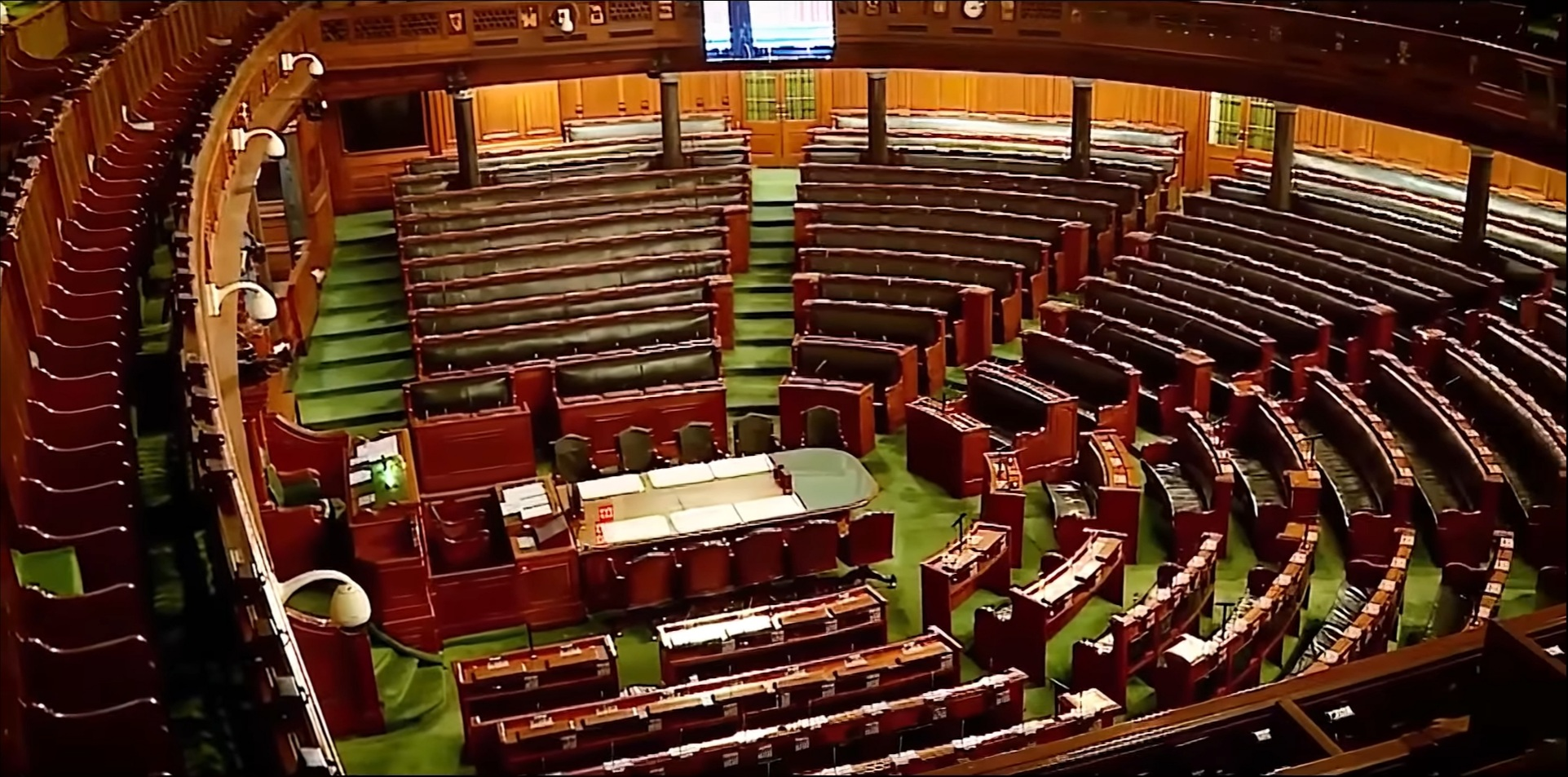
- View of Lok Sabha chamber in the Old Parliament House, New Delhi

Overview
- Legislative body: Indian Parliament
- Term: 17 June 2019 – 5 June 2024
- Election: 2019 Indian general election
- Government: Fourth National Democratic Alliance Government

Sovereign
- President: Ram Nath Kovind; Droupadi Murmu
- Vice President: M. Venkaiah Naidu; Jagdeep Dhankhar

House of the People
- Members: 543
- Speaker of the House: Om Birla
- Leader of the House: Narendra Modi
- Prime Minister: Narendra Modi
- Leader of the Opposition: None (Note: Adhir Ranjan Chowdhury served as the Leader of the Indian National Congress party in the Lok Sabha. There was no official opposition, as the opposition party is required to have at least 55 seats. The INC had a plurality (50) seats in the chamber.)
- Party control: National Democratic Alliance

The 17th Lok Sabha was formed by the members elected in the 2019 Indian general election. Elections, all across India, were conducted in seven phases from 11 April 2019 to 19 May 2019 by the Election Commission of India. Counting started officially on the morning of 23 May 2019 and the results were declared on the same day.

Om Birla was elected as the Speaker of the House. As no party had 10% of the seats to secure the position of Leader of Opposition, there was no Leader of the Opposition. However, Adhir Ranjan Chowdhury was the leader of the Indian National Congress in the Lok Sabha, which was the second largest party during the 17th Lok Sabha.

The 17th Lok Sabha had the most women representatives, at 14 percent. Out of the 543-member house, 267 members were first-time MPs. 233 members (43 percent) have had criminal charges against them. 475 members had their declared assets to be more than ₹1 crore (US$100,000); average assets were ₹20.9 crore (US$2.2 million). Around 39 percent of members were professionally noted to be politicians or involved in social work.

== Members ==
- Speaker: Om Birla, BJP
- Deputy Speaker: Vacant
- Leader of the House: Narendra Modi, BJP
- Leader of Opposition: Nil
- Secretary General: Utpal Kumar Singh

=== Party-wise distribution of seats ===
Party wise distribution
Party	Seats	Leader in Lok Sabha
BJP	303	Narendra Modi
INC	52	Adhir Ranjan Chowdhury
DMK	23	T. R. Baalu
AITC	22	Sudip Bandyopadhyay
YSRCP	22	P. V. Midhun Reddy
JD(U)	16	Rajiv Ranjan
SS	18	Rahul Shewale
BJD	12	Pinaki Misra
BSP	10	Girish Chandra
BRS	8	Nageswara Rao
SS(UBT)	5	Vinayak Raut
RLJP	5	Pashupati Kumar Paras
NCP-SP	4	Supriya Sule
TDP	3	K Ram Mohan Naidu
IUML	3	E. T. Mohammed Basheer
JKNC	3	Farooq Abdullah
CPI(M)	3	P R Natarajan
SP	5	S. T. Hasan
CPI	1	K. Subbarayan
AD(S)	2	Anupriya Patel
SAD	2	Harsimrat Kaur Badal
AIMIM	2	Asaduddin Owaisi
AIUDF	1	Badruddin Ajmal
SAD(A)	1	Simranjit Singh Mann
KC(M)	1	T. Chazhikadan
JD(S)	1	Prajwal Revanna
NCP	1	Sunil Tatkare
LJP(RV)	2	Chirag Paswan
JMM	1	Vijay Hansdak
AAP	0	
VCK	1	T.Thirumavalan
RSP	1	Premchandran
NDPP	1	T.Yepthomi
AJSU	1	CP Choudhary
NPF	1	Lorho Pfoze
NPP	1	Agatha Sangma
MNF	1	C. Lalrosanga
SKM	1	I.H Subba
Independent	2	Heera Saraniya
Vacant	30	Sarguja; Raigarh; Bilaspur; Ambala; Morena; Damoh; Sidhi; Jabalpur; Hoshangabad; Chandrapur; Pune; Jaipur Rural; Alwar; Nagaur; Rajsamand; Medak; Malkajgiri; Nalgonda; Bhongir; Ghazipur; Krishnanagar

== Statistics ==
Party-wise members with criminal charges
Party	Elected members	Members with criminal charges	Percent
BJP	303	116	39%
INC	52	28	47%
DMK	24	10	43%
JD(U)	16	13	81%
AITC	22	9	41%
BSP	10	5	50%
CPI(M)	3	2	67%
CPI	2	0	0%

The 17th Lok Sabha has the highest ever number of women politicians with a total of 78 which is nearly 14%. The earlier Lok Sabha had 62 women MPs. The average age of 17th Lok Sabha is noted to be 54 years and 12% of MPs are below the age of 40. Chandrani Murmu of BJD from Keonjhar constituency became the youngest member at the age of 25 years, 11 months and nine days and Shafiqur Rahman Barq of SP from Sambhal constituency became the oldest member at the age of 89. Education-wise, 43% MPs have graduate-level education, 25% are post-graduates and 4% of members have doctorates in various subjects. Of the total strength, 300 members have been elected as member for the first time and 197 members have been elected second time consecutively i.e. they were a member in the 16th Lok Sabha as well. BJP members Maneka Gandhi from Sultanpur constituency and Santosh Gangwar from Bareilly constituency has been elected to Lok Sabha for the eighth time. Religion-wise, 90.4% members are Hindus and 5.2% are Muslims, with the rest, nearly 4%, being Sikhs, Christians and other minorities.

According to the NGO Association for Democratic Reforms (ADR), 233 members (i.e. 43%) have criminal charges against them. Of these, nearly 29% of the cases are rape, murder, attempted murder, or crime against women. Congress MP Dean Kuriakose, of the Idukki constituency in Kerala, has 204 criminal cases.

Financially, the number of members who are crorepati (i.e. with declared assets more than ₹1 crore (US$100,000)) are 475. Members with more than ₹5 crore (US$520,000) assets are 266. The average assets of the whole Lok Sabha was ₹20.9 crore (US$2.2 million) and Nakul Nath of Congress from Chhindwara constituency has the highest declared assets of nearly ₹660 crore (US$69 million). Nath is followed by H. Vasanthakumar from Kanyakumari constituency, with ₹417 crore (US$43 million) and D. K. Suresh from Bangalore Rural constituency with ₹338 crore (US$35 million); both being of Congress party.

Professionally, around 39% noted to be politicians or involved in social work. This is followed by 38% of members declaring as agriculturists and 23% as businessmen.

== Bills ==
As of January 2024, during the tenure of the 17th Lok Sabha, only 16% of bills were referred to Parliamentary committees for examination and half of the bills passed so far were discussed only for less than two hours each. Whereas, the average annual sitting days reduced to only 55 in the 17th Lok Sabha according to a statistical study by the non-profit PRS Legislative Research.

== Subsequent by-elections and vacancies ==
State	Constituency	Name of elected M.P.	Party affiliation
Andhra Pradesh	Tirupati (SC)	Balli Durga Prasad Rao (Died on 16 September 2020)	YSR Congress Party
Andhra Pradesh	Tirupati (SC)	Maddila Gurumoorthy (Elected on 2 May 2021)	YSR Congress Party
Bihar	Valmiki Nagar	Baidyanath Prasad Mahto (Died on 28 February 2020)	JD(U)
Bihar	Valmiki Nagar	Sunil Kumar (Elected on 10 November 2020)	JD(U)
Bihar	Samastipur (SC)	Ram Chandra Paswan (Died on 21 July 2019)	Lok Janshakti Party
Bihar	Samastipur (SC)	Prince Raj (Elected on 24 October 2019)	Rashtriya Lok Janshakti Party
Chhattisgarh	Sarguja (ST)	Renuka Singh (Resigned on 6 December 2023)	Bharatiya Janata Party
Chhattisgarh	Sarguja (ST)	Vacant	
Chhattisgarh	Raigarh (ST)	Gomati Sai (Resigned on 6 December 2023)	Bharatiya Janata Party
Chhattisgarh	Raigarh (ST)	Vacant	
Chhattisgarh	Bilaspur	Arun Sao (Resigned on 6 December 2023)	Bharatiya Janata Party
Chhattisgarh	Bilaspur	Vacant	
Haryana	Ambala (SC)	Rattan Lal Kataria (Died on 18 May 2023)	Bharatiya Janata Party
Haryana	Ambala (SC)	Vacant	
Himachal Pradesh	Mandi	Ram Swaroop Sharma (Died on 17 March 2021)	Bharatiya Janata Party
Himachal Pradesh	Mandi	Pratibha Singh (Elected on 2 November 2021)	Indian National Congress
Karnataka	Belgaum	Suresh Angadi (Died on 23 September 2020)	Bharatiya Janata Party
Karnataka	Belgaum	Mangala Suresh Angadi (Elected on 2 May 2021)	Bharatiya Janata Party
Kerala	Malappuram	P. K. Kunhalikutty (Resigned on 3 February 2021)	Indian Union Muslim League
Kerala	Malappuram	M. P. Abdussamad Samadani (Elected on 2 May 2021)	Indian Union Muslim League
Madhya Pradesh	Morena	Narendra Singh Tomar (Resigned on 6 December 2023)	Bharatiya Janata Party
Madhya Pradesh	Morena	Vacant	
Madhya Pradesh	Damoh	Prahlad Singh Patel (Resigned on 6 December 2023)	Bharatiya Janata Party
Madhya Pradesh	Damoh	Vacant	
Madhya Pradesh	Sidhi	Riti Pathak (Resigned on 6 December 2023)	Bharatiya Janata Party
Madhya Pradesh	Sidhi	Vacant	
Madhya Pradesh	Jabalpur	Rakesh Singh (Resigned on 6 December 2023)	Bharatiya Janata Party
Madhya Pradesh	Jabalpur	Vacant	
Madhya Pradesh	Hoshangabad	Uday Pratap Singh (Resigned on 6 December 2023)	Bharatiya Janata Party
Madhya Pradesh	Hoshangabad	Vacant	
Madhya Pradesh	Khandwa	Nandkumar Singh Chauhan (Died on 2 March 2021)	Bharatiya Janata Party
Madhya Pradesh	Khandwa	Gyaneswar Patil (Elected on 2 November 2021)	Bharatiya Janata Party
Maharashtra	Chandrapur	Suresh Dhanorkar (Died on 30 May 2023)	Indian National Congress
Maharashtra	Chandrapur	Vacant	
Maharashtra	Pune	Girish Bapat (Died on 29 March 2023)	Bharatiya Janata Party
Maharashtra	Pune	Vacant	
Maharashtra	Satara	Udayanraje Bhosale (Resigned on 14 September 2019)	Nationalist Congress Party
Maharashtra	Satara	Shriniwas Patil (Elected on 24 October 2019)	Nationalist Congress Party
Punjab	Jalandhar	Santokh Singh Chaudhary (Died on 14 January 2023)	Indian National Congress
Punjab	Jalandhar	Sushil Kumar Rinku (Elected on 13 May 2023)	Aam Aadmi Party
Punjab	Sangrur	Bhagwant Mann (Resigned on 14 March 2022)	Aam Aadmi Party
Punjab	Sangrur	Simranjit Singh Mann (Elected on 26 June 2022)	SAD(A)
Rajasthan	Jaipur Rural	Rajyavardhan Singh Rathore (Resigned on 6 December 2023)	Bharatiya Janata Party
Rajasthan	Jaipur Rural	Vacant	
Rajasthan	Alwar	Balak Nath (Resigned on 7 December 2023)	Bharatiya Janata Party
Rajasthan	Alwar	Vacant	
Rajasthan	Nagaur	Hanuman Beniwal (Resigned on 8 December 2023)	Rashtriya Loktantrik Party
Rajasthan	Nagaur	Vacant	
Rajasthan	Rajsamand	Diya Kumari (Resigned on 6 December 2023)	Bharatiya Janata Party
Rajasthan	Rajsamand	Vacant	
Tamil Nadu	Kanyakumari	H. Vasanthakumar (Died on 28 August 2020)	Indian National Congress
Tamil Nadu	Kanyakumari	Vijay Vasanth (Elected on 2 May 2021)	Indian National Congress
Tamil Nadu	Erode	A. Ganeshamurthi (Dead on 28 March 2024)	Marumalarchi Dravida Munnetra Kazhagam
Tamil Nadu	Erode	Vacant	
Tamil Nadu	Nagapattinam	M. Selvarasu (Dead on 13 May 2024)	Communist Party of India
Tamil Nadu	Nagapattinam	Vacant	
Telangana	Medak	Kotha Prabhakar Reddy (Resigned on 13 December 2023)	Bharat Rashtra Samithi
Telangana	Medak	Vacant	
Telangana	Malkajgiri	A. Revanth Reddy (Resigned on 8 December 2023)	Indian National Congress
Telangana	Malkajgiri	Vacant	
Telangana	Nalgonda	N. Uttam Kumar Reddy (Resigned on 6 December 2023)	Indian National Congress
Telangana	Nalgonda	Vacant	
Telangana	Bhongir	Komatireddy Venkat Reddy (Resigned on 8 December 2023)	Indian National Congress
Telangana	Bhongir	Vacant	
Uttar Pradesh	Rampur	Azam Khan (Resigned on 22 March 2022)	Samajwadi Party
Uttar Pradesh	Rampur	Ghanshyam Singh Lodhi (Elected on 26 June 2022)	Bharatiya Janata Party
Uttar Pradesh	Mainpuri	Mulayam Singh Yadav (Died on 10 October 2022)	Samajwadi Party
Uttar Pradesh	Mainpuri	Dimple Yadav (Elected on 8 December 2022)	Samajwadi Party
Uttar Pradesh	Azamgarh	Akhilesh Yadav (Resigned on 22 March 2022)	Samajwadi Party
Uttar Pradesh	Azamgarh	Dinesh Lal Yadav Nirahua (Elected on 26 June 2022)	Bharatiya Janata Party
Uttar Pradesh	Ghazipur	Afzal Ansari (disqualified on 1 May 2023)	Bahujan Samaj Party
Uttar Pradesh	Ghazipur	Vacant	
West Bengal	Krishnanagar	Mahua Moitra (disqualified on 8 December 2023)	Trinamool Congress
West Bengal	Krishnanagar	Vacant	
West Bengal	Asansol	Babul Supriyo (Resigned on 22 October 2021)	Bharatiya Janata Party
West Bengal	Asansol	Shatrughan Sinha (Elected on 16 April 2022)	Trinamool Congress
Dadra and Nagar Haveli and Daman and Diu	Dadra and Nagar Haveli (ST)	Mohanbhai Sanjibhai Delkar (Died on 22 February 2021)	Independent
Dadra and Nagar Haveli and Daman and Diu	Dadra and Nagar Haveli (ST)	Kalaben Delkar (Elected on 2 November 2021)	Shiv Sena (Uddhav Balasaheb Thackeray)

== 2023 Security Breach ==
On 13 December 2023, two protestors breached the parliament and entered the Lok Sabha. The parliament security breach was organised by six protestors where two of the accused Sagar Sharma and D Manoranjan, jumped into the chamber from the visitor's gallery, and opened a yellow smoke canister, in an attempt to reach the Speaker's Chair. While outside the parliament, two others, Neelam Devi and Amol Shinde opened aerosol canister releasing a color smoke.

The sixth individual, Vishal Sharma, was caught meters away from the parliament after filming and uploading the video of the protest outside Parliament to the social media platforms. The leader of the protestors was Lalit Jha who is affiliated with the Samyabadi Subhas Sabha, a non-governmental organisation in West Bengal, and calls himself teacher on his Instagram profile. The Delhi police told the court that it was well planned attack on the parliament and all the nabbed accused could be affiliated with terrorist organisations.

Day after the security breach, MP Derek O'Brien of the Rajya Sabha and 13 MPs of Lok Sabha from the Congress and the Dravida Munnetra Kazhagam parties, were suspended till the remainder of the session for demanding a discussion on the breach. A week later, 33 MPs from Lok Sabha and 46 members from Rajya Sabha were suspended taking the total number of MPs suspended in this session to 92. Furthermore, 49 more members of Parliament (MPs) of the INDIA bloc of parties were suspended on 19 December 2023 for disrupting proceedings which took the total number of such suspensions in the two Houses to 141.

== See also ==
- List of members of the 17th Lok Sabha
- List of Indian parliamentary committees
