= Special session of the Parliament of India =

Special gathering of legislature in Indian Parliament

A special session in the Indian Parliament is a period when MPs gather to conduct legislative business outside of their usual sessions.

The calendar of events for the legislature in India is not fixed. Parliament usually convenes three times a year, with the budget session in beginning of calendar year, the monsoon session during the mid-year and the winter session at the end of calendar year. The government can call additional sessions besides these; the Cabinet Committee on Parliamentary Affairs decides on calling special sessions.

== Constitutional Provision ==
During the British era, ruling lawmakers in the Indian Empire were summoned once a year for revenue accountability as prescribed in the Government of India Act 1935. However, founding fathers of the Indian Constitution made it imperative that there exists no interval exceeding six months between two consecutive parliament sessions. Article 85(1) of the constitution reads "The President shall from time to time summon each House of Parliament to meet at such time and place as he thinks fit, but six months shall not intervene between its last sitting in one session and the date appointed for its first sitting in the next session"

Though the constitution has no direct mention of the "Special Session", Article 352 under Emergency Provisions touch upon a "special sitting of the House." Since the existing provisions does not impose any restriction on the frequency of parliamentary sessions, this grants the President of India the authority to convene Parliament on an indefinite number of occasions, as deemed necessary, on the advice of the Union Cabinet.

== Timeline ==
=== 1947 ===
The inaugural special session of the Parliament was assembled on the midnight of 14 and 15 August, with the purpose of commemorating India's independence and acknowledging the relinquishment of British authority.

=== 1962 ===
Amidst the Sino-Indian War, a delegation headed by the Jan Sangh leader, Atal Bihari Vajpayee, demanded a special parliamentary session to deliberate upon the ongoing conflict. Jawaharlal Nehru's government yielded to this demand and held a parliament special session on 8 November to discuss the issue.

=== 1972 ===
On 15 August early midnight, a special session was convened to commemorate the twenty-fifth anniversary of India's freedom from colonial rule.

=== 1977 ===
A two-day special session was called on 28 February to discuss on the extension of President's Rule in the states of Nagaland and Tamil Nadu. Members of the upper house met while the lower house was dissolved. It was the 99th session of Rajya Sabha.

=== 1991 ===
Rajya Sabha members met on 3 and 4 June in order to obtain the endorsement of the President's Rule in the state of Haryana. While the Lok Sabha was dissolved, the 158th session of Rajya Sabha was convened.

=== 1992 ===
An early midnight session was convened on 9 August to commemorate the 50th anniversary of the Quit India Movement.

=== 1997 ===
A midnight session was convened on 15 August, to commemorate the 50th anniversary of India's independence. Leader of Opposition party Atal Bihari Vajpayee moved the motion to consider the state of Indian democracy and its democratic institutions, economic situation, position of infrastructure and potential in the field of science and technology and the state of human development in the country. The six-day special session was held from 26 August to 1 September to discuss on the agenda.

=== 2008 ===
In July, a special session of the Lok Sabha was convened during the tenure of Prime Minister Manmohan Singh. This session was called when the United Progressive Alliance (UPA) government lost the coalition support of the Left parties leading to a no-confidence motion.

=== 2012 ===
On 13 May, the Lok Sabha convened a special session on a Sunday to commemorate the 60th anniversary of the inaugural sitting of the Indian Parliament.

=== 2015 ===
On 26 November, a two-day special session was called to commemorate 125th birth anniversary of B. R. Ambedkar, the leader of the drafting committee of the Indian constitution and the first law minister of the country.

=== 2017 ===
On 30 June, the Narendra Modi administration convened a joint midnight session of both houses of Parliament to introduce the Goods and Services Tax (GST), a wide-ranging indirect tax. This marked the first instance of a special session of Parliament being convened to deliberate on a bill.

=== 2023 ===
The Modi Government called for a special session of the parliament from 18 to 22 September. The newly built Parliament House was scheduled to host the commencement of House business during Day 2 of the special session. The session began in the old building, with proceedings to move to the new parliament building on 19 September, on the day of Ganesh Chaturthi.

The session saw the passage of the 106th Amendment to the Constitution, which established a 33 per cent reservation for women MPs in the Lok Sabha.
