= Sexual Harassment of Women at Workplace (Prevention, Prohibition and Redressal) Act, 2013 =

Act of the Parliament of India

Parliament of India
- Long title: An Act to provide protection against sexual harassment of women at workplace and for the prevention and redressal of complaints of sexual harassment and for matters connected therewith or incidental thereto.
- Citation: Act No 14 of 2013
- Territorial extent: Whole of India
- Passed by: Lok Sabha
- Passed: 3 September 2012
- Passed by: Rajya Sabha
- Passed: 26 February 2013
- Assented to by: President Pranab Mukherjee
- Assented to: 22 April 2013
- Commenced: 9 December 2013

Legislative history

Initiating chamber: Lok Sabha
- Bill title: Protection of Women against Sexual Harassment at Workplace Act, 2010
- Bill citation: Bill No. 144 of 2010
- Introduced by: Krishna Tirath, MoS for Women and Child Development
- Introduced: 7 December 2010
- Standing Committee on Human Resource Development: 30 December 2010–8 December 2011
- Passed: 3 September 2012
- Committee report: Standing Committee Report

Revising chamber: Rajya Sabha
- Passed: 26 February 2013

Amended by
- Repealing and Amending Act, 2016 (23 of 2016)
- Status: In force

The Sexual Harassment of Women at Workplace (Prevention, Prohibition and Redressal) Act, 2013, commonly known as POSH (Prevention of Sexual Harassment) Act is a legislative act in India that seeks to protect women from sexual harassment at their place of work. It was passed by the Lok Sabha (the lower house of the Indian Parliament) on 3 September 2012, by the Rajya Sabha (the upper house) on 26 February 2013, and got the assent of the President on 23 April 2013. The Act came into force on 9 December 2013. This statute superseded the Vishaka Guidelines for Prevention of Sexual Harassment (POSH) introduced by the Supreme Court (SC) of India. It was reported by the International Labour Organization that very few Indian employers were compliant to this statute. Most Indian employers have not implemented the law despite the legal requirement that any workplace with more than 10 employees need to implement it. According to a FICCI-EY November 2015 report, 36% of Indian companies and 25% among MNCs are not compliant with the Sexual Harassment Act, 2013. The government has threatened to take stern action against employers who fail to comply with this law.

A report by the Indian Express in May 2023 finds that half of India's sports federations are yet to create an "Internal Complaints Committee" as mandated by this law.

== Preamble and background ==
The introductory text of the Act is:

An Act to provide protection against sexual harassment of women at workplace and for the prevention and redressal of complaints of sexual harassment and for matters connected therewith or incidental thereto.

WHEREAS sexual harassment results in violation of the fundamental rights of a woman to equality under articles 14 and 15 of the Constitution of India and her right to life and to live with dignity under article 21 of the Constitution and right to practice any profession or to carry on any occupation, trade or business which includes a right to a safe environment free from sexual harassment;

AND WHEREAS the protection against sexual harassment and the right to work with dignity are universally recognised human rights by international conventions and instruments such as Convention on the Elimination of all Forms of Discrimination against Women, which has been ratified on the 25th June, 1993 by the Government of India;

AND WHEREAS it is expedient to make provisions for giving effect to the said Convention for protection of women against sexual harassment at workplace.

== Background and provisions ==
According to the Press Information Bureau of the Government of India:

The Act will ensure that women are protected against sexual harassment at all the work places, be it in public or private. This will contribute to realisation of their right to gender equality, life and liberty and equality in working conditions everywhere. The sense of security at the workplace will improve women's participation in work, resulting in their economic empowerment and inclusive growth.

This Act was essentially derived from the Vishaka Guidelines. The Vishaka Guidelines were certain procedures to be followed in cases of workplace sexual abuse. These guidelines were formulated after the landmark case Vishaka and others v. State of Rajasthan. This case was brought to the Supreme Court because of the sheer inability of the High Court of Rajasthan to provide justice to Bhanwari Devi who was part of Women's Development Program of the Rajasthan Government. She was brutally gang raped for stopping a child marriage being conducted in a town. This was a part of her duties as a member of the Development Program to stop any illegal activity conducted against children and women. Moreover, this Act uses the definition of sexual harassment laid down by the Supreme Court in Vishakha and others v State of Rajasthan.

Article 19 (1) g of the Indian Constitution affirms the right of all citizens to be employed in any profession of their choosing or to practice their own trade or business. This case established that actions resulting in a violation of one's rights to ‘Gender Equality’ and ‘Life and Liberty’ are in fact a violation of the victim's fundamental right under Article 19 (1) g. The case ruling established that sexual harassment violates a woman's rights in the workplace and is thus not just a matter of personal injury. This case ruling had issued Vishaka guidelines under Article 32 of the Constitution of India. The Supreme Court had made it mandatory that these had to be followed by all origination until a legislative framework on the subject has been drawn-up and enacted. However, the legislative void continued and the Supreme Court in Apparel Export Promotion Council v. A.K Chopra ((1999) 1 SCC 759) reiterated the law laid down in the Vishakha Judgment. Dr. Medha Kotwal of Aalochana (an NGO) highlighted a number of individual cases of sexual harassment stating that the Vishakha Guidelines were not being effectively implemented. Converting the letter into a writ petition, the Supreme Court took cognizance and undertook monitoring of implementation of the Vishakha Guidelines across the country. The Supreme Court asserted that in case of a non-compliance or non-adherence of the Vishakha Guidelines, it would be open to the aggrieved persons to approach the respective High Courts.

The legislative progress of the Act was a long process where the Bill was first introduced by Minister of Women and Child Development Krishna Tirath in 2007 and approved by the Union Cabinet in January 2010. It was tabled in the Lok Sabha in December 2010 and referred to the Parliamentary Standing Committee on Human Resources Development. The committee's report was published on 30 November 2011. In May 2012, the Union Cabinet approved an amendment to include domestic workers. The amended Bill was finally passed by the Lok Sabha on 3 September 2012. The Bill was passed by the Rajya Sabha (the upper house of the Indian Parliament) on 26 February 2013. It received the assent of the President of India and was published in the Gazette of India, Extraordinary, Part-II, Section-1, dated 23 April 2013 as Act No. 14 of 2013.

== Major features ==
- The Act defines sexual harassment at the work place and creates a mechanism for redressal of complaints. It also provides safeguards against false or malicious charges.
- The Act also covers concepts of 'quid pro quo harassment' and 'hostile work environment' as forms of sexual harassment if it occurs in connection with an act or behaviour of sexual harassment.
- The definition of "aggrieved woman", who will get protection under the Act is extremely wide to cover all women, irrespective of her age or employment status, whether in the organised or unorganised sectors, public or private and covers clients, customers and domestic workers as well.
- An employer has been defined as any person who is responsible for management, supervision, and control of the workplace and includes persons who formulate and administer policies of such an organisation under Section 2(g).
- While the "workplace" in the Vishakha Guidelines is confined to the traditional office set-up where there is a clear employer-employee relationship, the Act goes much further to include organisations, department, office, branch unit etc. in the public and private sector, organized and unorganized, hospitals, nursing homes, educational institutions, sports institutes, stadiums, sports complex and any place visited by the employee during the course of employment including the transportation. Even non-traditional workplaces which involve tele-commuting will get covered under this law.
- The committee is required to complete the inquiry within a time period of 90 days. On completion of the inquiry, the report will be sent to the employer or the District Officer, as the case may be, they are mandated to take action on the report within 60 days.
- Every employer is required to constitute an Internal Complaints Committee at each office or branch with 10 or more employees. The District Officer is required to constitute a Local Complaints Committee at each district, and if required at the block level.
- The Complaints Committees have the powers of civil courts for gathering evidence.
- The Complaints Committees are required to provide for conciliation before initiating an inquiry, if requested by the complainant.
- The inquiry process under the Act should be confidential and the Act lays down a penalty of Rs 5000 on the person who has breached confidentiality.
- The Act requires employers to conduct education and sensitisation programmes and develop policies against sexual harassment, among other obligations. The objective of Awareness Building can be achieved through Banners and Poster displayed in the premises, eLearning courses for the employees, managers and Internal Committee members, Classroom training sessions, Communication of Organizational Sexual Harassment Policy through emails, eLearning or Classroom Training. It is recommended that the eLearning or Classroom Training be delivered in the primary communication language of the employee.
- Every organization must file an Annual Report to the District Officer every calendar year as prescribed in the Rule 14 of the Sexual Harassment of Women at Workplace (Prevention, Prohibition and Redressal) Rules, 2013.
- Penalties have been prescribed for employers. Non-compliance with the provisions of the Act shall be punishable with a fine of up to ₹ 50,000. Repeated violations may lead to higher penalties and cancellation of licence or deregistration to conduct business.
- Government can order an officer to inspect workplace and records related to sexual harassment in any organisation.
- Under the Act, which also covers students in schools and colleges as well as patients in hospitals, employers and local authorities will have to set up grievance committees to investigate all complaints. Employers who fail to comply will be punished with a fine of up to 50,000 rupees.

== Penal Code ==
Through the Criminal Law (Amendment) Act, 2013, Section 354 A was added to the Indian Penal Code that stipulates what consists of a sexual harassment offence and what the penalties shall be for a man committing such an offence. Penalties range from one to three years imprisonment and/or a fine. Additionally, with sexual harassment being a crime, employers are obligated to report offences.

== Criticism ==
Brinda Karat, serving in the Rajya Sabha as a Communist Party of India (Marxist) member for West Bengal, initially complained that the Bill does not cover women in the armed forces and excludes women agricultural workers, "a gross injustice to agricultural workers who are the single largest female component of work force in the country." However, the final bill includes the clause "No woman shall be subjected to sexual harassment at any workplace" (clause 3.1), and is considered to have addressed those concerns. In the May 2012 draft Bill, the burden of proof is on the women who complain of harassment. If found guilty of making a false complaint or giving false evidence, she could be prosecuted, which has raised concerns about women being even more afraid of reporting offences. Before seeing the final version of the bill, lawyer and activist Vrinda Grover said, "I hope the Bill does not have provisions for penalizing the complainant for false complaints. This is the most under-reported crime. Such provision will deter a woman to come forward and complain." Zakia Soman, a women's rights campaigner at ActionAid India said that "it helps to have a law and we welcome it, but the crux will lie in its implementation once it is enacted."

Manoj Mitta of The Times of India complained that Bill does not protect men, saying it "is based on the premise that only female employees needed to be safeguarded." Nishith Desai Associates, a law group, wrote a detailed analysis that included concerns about the role of the employer in sexual harassment cases. They called out the fact that there is no stipulated liability for employers in cases of employee-to-employee harassment, something upheld in many other countries. They also viewed the provision that employers are obligated to address grievances in a timely manner at the workplace as problematic because of potentially uncooperative employees. Furthermore, the law requires a third-party non-governmental organisation to be involved, which could make employers less comfortable in reporting grievances, due to confidentiality concerns.

Compliance to this statute has so far been left to the vagaries of the employers and government has not taken any significant step to enforce the law so far. For example, 6 months after the law came into effect, the state of UP remained dreadful as women could not participate in the workforce due to sexual harassment. Everyday women are being harassed but there are no records for many cases.

Some tribunals have commented on the constitutionality of some of the provisions of the statute, especially section 4 and Section 7.

== See also ==
- Criminal Law (Amendment) Act, 2013
- Sexism in India
- Women's Reservation Bill
