= Directive Principles in India =

Governing principles of government divisions in India

The Directive Principles of State Policy of India are the guidelines to be followed by the government of India for the governance of the country. They are not enforceable by any court, but the principles laid down there are considered "fundamental" in the governance of the country, which makes it the duty of the State to apply these principles in making laws to establish a just society in the country. The principles have been inspired by the Directive Principles given in the Constitution of Ireland which are related to social justice, economic welfare, foreign policy, and legal and administrative matters.

Directive Principles are classified under the following categories: Economic and Socialistic, Political and Administrative, Justice and Legal, Environmental, Protection of Monuments, Peace and Security.

The History of Ireland, particularly the Irish Home Rule Movement; hence, the Directive Principles of the Indian constitution have been greatly influenced by the Directive Principles of Social Policy. The idea of such policies "can be traced to the Declaration of the Rights of Man and of the Citizen proclaimed by Revolutionary France and the Declaration of Independence by the American Colonies." The Indian constitution was also influenced by the United Nations Universal Declaration of Human Rights.

Indians, who were seeking independence from British rule and their own government, were particularly influenced by the independence of Ireland from British rule and the development of the Irish constitution. Also, the Directive Principles of State Policy in the Irish Constitution were looked upon by the people of India as an inspiration for the independent Indian Government to comprehensively tackle complex social and economic challenges across a vast, diverse nation and population.

In 1928, the Nehru Commission composing of representatives of all Indian political parties, proposed constitutional reforms for India that apart from calling for dominion status for India and elections under universal suffrage, would guarantee rights deemed fundamental, representation for religious and ethnic minorities, and limit the powers of the government. In 1931, the Indian National Congress (the largest Indian political party of the time) adopted resolutions committing itself to the defence of fundamental civil rights, as well as socio-economic rights such as the minimum wage and the abolition of untouchability and serfdom, committing themselves to socialism & Gandhian philosophy.

When India obtained Independence on 15 August 1947, the task of developing a constitution for the Nation was undertaken by the Constituent Assembly of India, composing of elected representatives under the presidency of Dr. Rajendra Prasad. While members of Congress composed of a large majority, Congress leaders appointed persons from diverse political backgrounds to responsibilities of developing the constitution and national laws. Notably, Bhimrao Ramji Ambedkar became the chairperson of the drafting committee, while Jawaharlal Nehru and Sardar Vallabhbhai Patel became chairperson of committees and sub-committees responsible for different subjects. A notable development during that period having significant effect on the Indian constitution took place on 10 December 1948 when the United Nations General Assembly adopted the Universal Declaration of Human Rights and called upon all member States to adopt these rights in their respective constitutions.

Both the Fundamental Rights and the Directive Principles of State Policy were included in the I Draft Constitution (February 1948), the II Draft Constitution (17 October 1948) and the III and final Draft Constitution (26 November 1949), prepared by the Drafting Committee.

Directive Principles are affirmative directions and are non-justiciable. However, this does not mean that they are subordinate to fundamental rights; Fundamental Rights and Directive Principles go hand in hand. Article 37 of the Constitution of India talks about the application of Directive Principles provided under Article 36 to Article 51.

== Characteristics ==
While debating on DPSP in the Constituent Assembly, Dr. Ambedkar stated on 19 November 1948 as given below highlighting that the DPSP shall be the basis of future governance of the country:

It is the intention of this Assembly that in future both the legislature and the executive should not merely pay lip service to these principles enacted in this part, but that they should be made the basis of all executive and legislative action that may be taken hereafter in the matter of the governance of the country.

Directive Principles of State Policy aim to create social and economic conditions under which the citizens can lead a good life. They also aim to establish social and economic democracy through a welfare state. Though the Directive Principles are non-justiciable rights of the people but fundamental in the governance of the country, it shall be the duty of the State to apply these principles in making laws per Article 37. Besides, all executive agencies of union and states should also be guided by these principles. Even the judiciary has to keep them in mind in deciding cases.

An existing policy in line with DPSP can not be reversed, however it can be expanded further in line with DPSP. The policy changes applicable under DPSP shall not be reversible unless the applicable DPSP is deleted by constitutional amendment (ex. prohibition implemented once in a state can not be repealed later as long as it is part of DPSP).

== Directives ==
The directive principles ensure that the State shall strive to promote the welfare of the people by securing a social order in which social, economic and political justice is animated/informed in all institutions of life as per Article 38 (1). Dr. Ambedkar clarified as given below in the Constituent Assembly debates on Article 38 highlighting its inevitable implementation.

... The word 'strive' which occurs in the Draft Constitution, in judgement, is very important. We have used it because our intention is even when there are circumstances which prevent the Government, or which stand in the way of the Government giving effect to these Directive Principles, they shall, even under hard and unpropitious circumstances, always strive in the fulfilment of these Directives. That is why we have used the word 'strive'. Otherwise, it would be open for any Government to say that the circumstances are so bad, that the finances are so inadequate that we cannot even make an effort in the direction in which the Constitution asks us to go.

Also, the State shall strive to minimise the inequalities in income and endeavor to eliminate economic inequality as well as inequalities in status and opportunities, not only among individuals but also among groups of people residing in different areas or engaged in different vocations per Article 38 (2). The State shall aim for securing the right to an adequate means of livelihood for all citizens, both men and women as well as equal pay for equal work for both men and women. The State should work to prevent the concentration of wealth and means of production in a few hands, and try to ensure that ownership and control of the material resources is distributed to best serve the common good. Child abuse and exploitation of workers should be prevented. Children should be allowed to develop in a healthy manner and should be protected against exploitation and against moral and material abandonment per Article 39. The State shall provide free legal aid to ensure that equal opportunities for securing justice is ensured to all, and is not denied by reason of economic or other disabilities per Article 39A. The State shall also work for the organisation of village panchayats and help enable them to function as units of self-government per Article 40. The State shall endeavour to provide the right to work, to education and to public assistance in cases of unemployment, old age, sickness and disablement, within the limits of economic capacity per Article 41 as well as provide for just and humane conditions of work and maternity relief per Article 42.

The State should also ensure a living wage and proper working conditions for workers, with full enjoyment of leisure and social and cultural activities. Also, the promotion of cottage industries in rural areas is one of the obligations of the State per Article 43 The State shall take steps to promote their participation in the management of industrial undertakings per Article 43A.

Also, the State shall endeavor to secure a uniform civil code for all citizens per Article 44 and provide early childhood care and education for all children until they complete the age of six years per Article 45. This directive regarding education of children was updated by the 86th Amendment Act, 2002. It should work for the economic and educational upliftment of scheduled castes, scheduled tribes and other weaker sections of the society per Article 46.

The directive principles commit the State to raise the level of nutrition and the standard of living and to improve public health, particularly by prohibiting intoxicating drinks and drugs injurious to health except for medicinal purposes per Article 47. It should also organise agriculture and animal husbandry on modern and scientific lines by improving breeds and prohibiting the slaughter of cows, calves, other milch and draught cattle per Article 48. It should protect and improve the environment and safeguard the forests and wildlife of the country per Article 48A. This directive, regarding the protection of forests and wildlife, was added by the 42nd Amendment Act, 1976.

Protection of monuments, places and objects of historic and artistic interest and national importance against destruction and damage per Article 49 and separation of judiciary from the executive in public services per Article 50 are also the obligations of the State as laid down in the directive principles.

Finally Article 51 ensure that the State shall strive for the promotion and maintenance of international peace and security, just and honourable relations between nations, respect for international law and treaty obligations, as well as settlement of international disputes by arbitration.

The judiciary is not part of the state as defined in Article 36 to claim non-applicability of DPSP (Part IV of the constitution) under Article 37 wherever applicable to it.

== Implementation ==
There is no need of any constitutional amendment and simple legislation by the Parliament is adequate to implement the Directive Principles as applicable laws per Article 245 as they are already enshrined in the constitution. The State has made few efforts till now to implement the Directive Principles.

The Programme of Universalisation of Elementary Education and the five-year plans has been accorded the highest priority in order to provide free education to all children up to the age of 14 years. The 86th constitutional amendment of 2002 inserted a new article, Article 21-A, into the Constitution, that seeks to provide free and compulsory education to all children aged 6 to 14 years. Welfare schemes for the weaker sections are being implemented both by the Central and State governments. These include programmes such as boys' and girls' hostels for scheduled castes' or scheduled tribes' students. The year 1990–1991 was declared as the "Year of Social Justice" in the memory of B.R. Ambedkar. The government provides free textbooks to students belonging to scheduled castes or scheduled tribes pursuing medicine and engineering courses. During 2002–2003, a sum of Rs. 47.7 million was released for this purpose. In order that scheduled castes and scheduled tribes are protected from atrocities, the Government enacted the Prevention of Atrocities Act, which provided severe punishments for such atrocities.

Several Land Reform Acts were enacted to provide ownership rights to poor farmers. Up to September 2001, more than 20,000,000 acres (80,000 km^{2}) of land had been distributed to scheduled castes, scheduled tribes and the landless poor. The thrust of banking policy in India has been to improve banking facilities in the rural areas. The Minimum Wages Act of 1948 empowers government to fix minimum wages for employees engaged in various employments. The Consumer Protection Act of 1986 provides for the better protection of consumers. The act is intended to provide simple, speedy and inexpensive redressal to the consumers' grievances, award relief and compensation wherever appropriate to the consumer. The Equal Remuneration Act of 1976, provides for equal pay for equal work for both men and women. The Sampoorna Grameen Rozgar Yojana was launched in 2001 to attain the objective of gainful employment for the rural poor. The programme was implemented through the Panchayati Raj institutions.

Panchayati Raj now covers almost all states and Union territories. One-third of the total number of seats have been reserved for women in Panchayats at every level; in the case of Bihar, half the seats have been reserved for women. Legal aid at the expense of the State has been made compulsory in all cases pertaining to criminal law, if the accused is too poor to engage a lawyer. Judiciary has been separated from the executive in all the states and Union territories except Jammu and Kashmir and Nagaland.

India's Foreign Policy has also to some degree been influenced by the DPSPs. India, in the past has condemned all acts of aggression and has also supported the United Nations' peace-keeping activities. By 2004, the Indian Army had participated in 37 UN peace-keeping operations. India played a key role in the passing of a UN resolution in 2003, which envisaged better co-operation between the Security Council and the troop-contributing countries. India has also been in favour of nuclear disarmament.

Per Article 38 (1), prompt rendering of the justice by courts is part of animating judiciary. Rendering prompt justice is the foremost purpose of the constitution as enshrined in the Preamble to the constitution also. However the judiciary is failing dismally in this respect by causing inordinate delay considering time of rendering justice in a case arbitrarily is its constitutional liberty.

== Amendments ==
Changes in Directive Principles require a Constitutional amendment which has to be passed by a special majority of both houses of the Parliament. This means that an amendment requires the approval of two-thirds of the members present and voting and by the absolute majority of the house – whether the Lok Sabha or Rajya Sabha.

- Article 31-C, amended by the 42nd Amendment Act of 1976 seeking to upgrade the DPSPs. If laws are made to give effect to any of the Directive Principles overriding Fundamental Rights, they shall not be invalid on the grounds that they take away the Fundamental Rights. In Minerva Mills v. Union of India case, Supreme Court ruled that 42nd Amendment Act to the Article 31C is not valid and ultra vires.
- Articles 38 (2), was added by the Forty-fourth Amendment Act, 1978 of the Constitution
- Articles 39A, which directs the state to secure Equal justice and free legal aid, was added by the Forty-second Amendment Act, 1976 of the Constitution
- Articles 43A, which directs the state to secure Participation of workers in management of industries, was added by the Forty-second Amendment Act, 1976 of the Constitution
- Articles 43B, which directs the state to strive for Promotion of co-operative societies, was added by the Ninety-Seventh Amendment of the Constitution of India
- Article 45, which ensures Provision for early childhood care and free education for all children until they complete six years of age, was added by the 86th Amendment Act, 2002.
- Article 48A, which ensures Protection and improvement of environment and safeguarding of forests and wild life, was added by the Forty-second Amendment Act, 1976
- Articles 49, was modified by the Seventh Amendment Act, 1956 of the Constitution

== See also ==
- Fundamental Rights, Directive Principles and Fundamental Duties of India
- Fundamental Rights in India
- Government of India
- Parliament of India
- List of amendments of the Constitution of India
- Writs in Indian law
