= Women's Reservation Bill, 2010 =

Constitutional amendment of India

Parliament of India
- Enacted by: Parliament of India

The Women's Reservation Bill or The Constitution (108th Amendment) Bill, 9 March 2010, is a bill passed in the Parliament of India which says to amend the Constitution of India to reserve a third 3 of all seats in the lower house of Parliament of India, the Lok Sabha, and in all state legislative assemblies for women. The seats were proposed to be reserved in rotation and would have been determined by draw of lots in such a way that a seat would be reserved only once in three consecutive general elections.

The Rajya Sabha passed the bill on 9 March 2010. The Lok Sabha did not vote on the bill. The bill lapsed after having pending status in the Lok Sabha; it expired twice, in 2014 and 2019.

An equivalent bill was passed by Lok Sabha on 20 September 2023 with 454 votes in favour and two against. It was then passed by the Rajya Sabha unanimously. As of 21 September 2023 the bill was pending presidential assent. President Droupadi Murmu signed the bill on 28 September 2023, and the gazette notification was also published the same day, which made it clear that the reservation will come into force soon after the first delimitation (frozen until 2026).

== Standing Committee recommendation ==
Originally, the Bill proposed reserving women in all legislative bodies, but the Standing Committee suggested restricting the reservation in the 'House of People' Lok Sabha in the Centre and Assembly in States and Union Territories with the legislature. This recommendation was accepted by the Government and incorporated into the Bill.

The bill was opposed by then Samajwadi Party chief Mulayam Singh Yadav, commenting that "if the bill is passed it will fill Parliament with the kind of women who invite catcalls and whistles". The remarks were criticized by leaders across several parties and described as sexist in media reports and by some of his own party colleagues.

== History of Women's reservation bills ==
In 1987, Prime Minister Rajiv Gandhi's government constituted a 14-member committee led by Central Minister Margaret Alva to give recommendations for improving the status of women. Rajiv Gandhi introduced the Constitution Amendment Bill to provide one-third reservation for women in rural and urban local bodies. The Bill was passed in Lok Sabha but failed to get passed in Rajya Sabha in September 1989. In 1992, Prime Minister PV Narasimha Rao's government passed the 73rd and 74th Constitutional Amendment Acts which mandated 33.3 percent reservation for women in Panchayati Raj Institutions. The women's reservation bill was first introduced by HD Deve Gowda-led government, as Constitution (81st Amendment) Bill, 1996 in the 11th Lok Sabha on 12 September 1996. It was then referred to the Joint Committee of the two Houses of parliament, but the bill lapsed with the dissolution of the 11th Lok Sabha. The joint parliamentary committee report examining the women's reservation Bill in 1996 recommended that reservation be provided for women of Other Backward Classes (OBCs) once the Constitution was amended to allow for reservation for OBCs.

In 1993, a constitutional amendment was passed in India that called for a random one third of village council leader, or sarpanch, positions in gram panchayat, to be reserved for women.

A long-term plan was made to extend this reservation to the federal parliament and to state legislative assemblies.

On 19 September 2023, the Narendra Modi government introduced a form of the bill as the 128th Constitutional Amendment Bill, 2023, during Parliament Special Session in Lok Sabha in new parliament building. The bill was passed by Lok Sabha on 20 September 2023 with 454 votes in favour and two against. As of 20 September 2023, the bill was expected to be voted on by Rajya Sabha; the result was unanimous approval.

Only two members voted against the bill were Asaduddin Owaisi and Imtiyaz Jaleel from All India Majlis-e-Ittehadul Muslimeen.

== See also ==
- Nari Shakti Vandan Adhiniyam
- List of amendments of the Constitution of India

Law in India

- Sexual Harassment of Women at Workplace (Prevention, Prohibition and Redressal) Act, 2013

Women in India

- Domestic violence in India
- Dowry system in India
- Female foeticide in India
- Gender inequality in India
- Gender pay gap in India
- Men's rights movement in India
- National Commission for Women
- Rape in India
- Welfare schemes for women in India
- Women in India
- Women in Indian Armed Forces
- Women's suffrage in India
