= One Hundred and Sixth Amendment of the Constitution of India =

2023 constitutional amendment of India

The Constitution (Hundred and Sixth Amendment) Act, 2023

Parliament of India
- Long title: An Act further to amend the Constitution of India.
- Territorial extent: India
- Enacted by: Lok Sabha
- Enacted: 20 September 2023
- Enacted by: Rajya Sabha
- Enacted: 21 September 2023
- Assented to by: President Droupadi Murmu
- Assented to: 28 September 2023
- Date of expiry: Ceases 15 years from commencement of reservation (per Article 334A)

Legislative history

Initiating chamber: Lok Sabha
- Bill title: The Constitution (One Hundred and Twenty-Eighth Amendment) Bill, 2023
- Introduced by: Minister of Law and Justice, Arjun Ram Meghwal
- Introduced: 19 September 2023
- Passed: 20 September 2023
- Voting summary: 454 voted for; 2 voted against; None abstained

Revising chamber: Rajya Sabha
- Bill title: The Constitution (One Hundred and Twenty-Eighth Amendment) Bill, 2023
- Received from the Lok Sabha: 20 September 2023
- Passed: 21 September 2023
- Voting summary: 214 voted for; None voted against; None abstained

Summary
- To reserve, as nearly as maybe, 33 percent of seats for women in Lok Sabha and state assemblies.

Keywords
- Women reservation, 33 percent reservation
- Previous Amendment: 105th in 2021
- Status: In force

The Constitution (One Hundred and Sixth Amendment) Act, popularly known as the Women's Reservation Bill, 2023 (ISO 15919: Nārī Śakti Vandan Adhiniyam), was introduced in Lok Sabha on 19 September 2023 during the special session of Parliament. This legislation seeks to allocate 33 percent of the seats in the directly elected Lok Sabha, State legislative assemblies, Delhi Legislative Assembly, Puducherry Legislative Assembly and Jammu and Kashmir Legislative Assembly (Note: A specific provision of the bill includes women reservation in Delhi, Puducherry and Jammu & Kashmir, despite not being an Indian State as per the Constitution.) for women.

The bill is the possible culmination of a legislative debate that had been ongoing for 27 years, including the lapsed Women's Reservation Bill (2010), due to the lack of consensus among political parties. The bill was the first that was considered in the new parliament building. On 20 September 2023, Lok Sabha passed the bill with 454 votes in favour and two against. The Rajya Sabha passed the bill unanimously with 214 votes in favour and none against, on 21 September 2023. President Droupadi Murmu signed the bill on 28 September 2023, and the gazette notification was also published the same day, which made it clear that the reservation will come into force soon after the first delimitation (frozen until 2026).

On 16 April 2026, the Central Ministry of Law and Justice issued a gazette notification bringing the Act into force. However, the 33% reservation itself remains inoperative pending the first census taken after that date and a subsequent delimitation exercise (see Implementation).

== History ==
The demand for legislative gender quotas in India emerged during the Constituent Assembly debates in 1946, but was not adopted at the time. The first formal bill was introduced in 1996 as the 81st Constitutional Amendment Bill during the United Front government of H. D. Deve Gowda. Subsequent versions were introduced in 1998, 1999, and 2008. The 2008 version, designated the 108th Amendment Bill, passed the Rajya Sabha in 2010 but lapsed in 2014 without Lok Sabha approval. The 2023 iteration succeeded due to a shifted political consensus and the ruling coalition's parliamentary majority.

== Statistics ==
The 2023 composition of the Lok Sabha revealed underrepresentation of women Members of Parliament (MPs), constituting less than 15 percent of its members. Similarly, this gender disparity was stronger in state assemblies including Andhra Pradesh, Arunachal Pradesh, Assam, Goa, Gujarat, Himachal Pradesh, Karnataka, Kerala, Madhya Pradesh, Maharashtra, Manipur, Meghalaya, Odisha, Sikkim, Tamil Nadu, Telangana, Tripura and Puducherry, where the representation of women fell below 10 percent. In the 2024 general election (18th Lok Sabha), 74 women MPs were initially elected out of 543 seats (~13.6%), a slight decline from the 17th Lok Sabha.

The bill aims to increase the number of Women Parliamentarians to 181. The 17th Lok Sabha (2019–2024) comprised 78 female members, the highest until then.

On 20 September 2023, Central Minister of Home Affairs Amit Shah informed during the discussion on the Women's Reservation Bill that census and the delimitation exercise will take place after the Lok Sabha elections in 2024.

== Provisions ==
The Act inserts three new articles into the Constitution of India:

- Article 330A reserves seats for women in the Lok Sabha. As nearly as may be, one-third of the total number of seats filled by direct election shall be reserved for women. Within the seats reserved for Scheduled Castes and Scheduled Tribes, one-third are reserved for women of those categories.
- Article 332A applies the same framework to State Legislative Assemblies and the Legislative Assembly of the National Capital Territory of Delhi.
- Article 334A stipulates that the reservation will come into effect after a delimitation exercise undertaken using the first census published after the Act's commencement. The reservation ceases 15 years from commencement. Reserved seats rotate after each subsequent delimitation as determined by Parliament.

The amendment does not apply to the Rajya Sabha or State Legislative Councils.

== Implementation ==
The Act was brought into force via a gazette notification on 16 April 2026. However, the reservation itself is defined to be implemented once a new census is published and the delimitation exercise is completed. The process of delimitation entails the revision of constituency boundaries pertaining to Lok Sabha and State Assemblies, with the aim of accurately reflecting increase in population distribution.

=== 2026 Legislative attempt to expedite ===
In April 2026, the government introduced three bills to enable implementation before the 2029 general elections:

- Constitution (One Hundred and Thirty-First Amendment) Bill, 2026 — proposed amending Article 82 to allow Parliament to determine by law which census to use for delimitation, enabling use of 2011 Census data rather than waiting for a post-2026 census. It also proposed increasing Lok Sabha seats from 550 to 850.
- Delimitation Bill, 2026
- Union Territories Laws (Amendment) Bill, 2026

The 131st Amendment Bill was defeated in Lok Sabha on 17 April 2026, receiving 298 votes in favour and 230 against (the required two-thirds majority of 528 voting was 352). Following the defeat, the government withdrew the associated bills. Critics from southern states argued the seat expansion combined with delimitation based on updated population data would disproportionately benefit northern states.

=== Delimitation Context ===
The linkage to census and delimitation stems from the 84th Constitutional Amendment (2001), which froze the allocation of parliamentary and assembly seats (based on the 1971 Census) until the first census after 2026. The 2021 Census was postponed indefinitely. Rotation of reserved seats shall occur after each subsequent delimitation exercise under Article 334A(3).

== Parliamentary debates ==
=== Lok Sabha ===
On 19 September 2023, Prime Minister Narendra Modi introduced the Bill in the New Parliament House, describing it as the “Nari Shakti Vandan Adhiniyam.” He highlighted the historical context, noting previous unsuccessful attempts in 1996 and during the tenure of Atal Bihari Vajpayee. The debate saw broad support across parties, though with significant discussion on timing and sub-quotas. Indian National Congress leader Sonia Gandhi demanded immediate implementation, calling it Rajiv Gandhi's “dream.” Rahul Gandhi and leaders from the DMK and Trinamool Congress raised concerns about the linkage to delimitation and the absence of an OBC quota. The Bill was passed in the Lok Sabha on 20 September 2023 with 454 votes in favour and 2 against.

=== Rajya Sabha ===
The Rajya Sabha took up the Bill on 21 September 2023. Nirmala Sitharaman explained that the reservation would follow a delimitation exercise conducted after the census. Opposition members, including Kapil Sibal, Mallikarjun Kharge, and Derek O'Brien, expressed concerns over delayed implementation and the lack of women chief ministers in NDA-ruled states. J. P. Nadda defended the timing and addressed the OBC quota demands. The Rajya Sabha passed the Bill unanimously with 214 votes in favour.

== Reactions ==
The bill received broad cross-party welcome, though with significant disagreements on implementation timing and scope. The Congress proposed an unsuccessful amendment to implement the reservation by 2024. Swami Prasad Maurya of Samajwadi Party termed the bill “flawed” for lacking OBC reservation. Nitish Kumar, Chief Minister of Bihar, questioned the delayed implementation timeline. Yogendra Yadav argued implementation would not occur until 2039, calling the legislation “trickery.” Both the ruling party and opposition claimed credit for advancing the legislation.

=== Criticism ===
The legislation has faced structured criticism on several grounds:

Implementation Delay
Critics argue that linking the reservation to a post-2026 delimitation effectively postpones its effect by several electoral cycles. Opposition parties and analysts, such as Yogendra Yadav, have termed this linkage a “delay tactic.” Projections suggest that the quota may not be implemented until the 2029 or 2034 elections.

Exclusion of OBC and Minority Quotas
Political parties including the Indian National Congress, Samajwadi Party, and Rashtriya Janata Dal have criticised the absence of sub-reservation for women from Other Backward Classes (OBC) and religious minorities. They argue that without such sub-quotas, the legislation will disproportionately benefit urban and upper-caste women. The only two votes against the Bill in the Lok Sabha came from All India Majlis-e-Ittehadul Muslimeen MPs who demanded these inclusions.

Omission of Upper Houses
The reservation applies only to the Lok Sabha and State Assemblies. Critics note that the omission of the Rajya Sabha and State Legislative Councils creates a representation gap in the upper chambers of Indian legislatures.

Rotation Mechanism
The mandatory rotation of reserved seats after each delimitation has raised concerns about the continuity of representation and the potential for “proxy” candidatures, where male relatives of women candidates wield actual power. Opponents of this view argue that rotation prevents the permanent exclusion of male candidates from specific constituencies.

== Following legislations ==
The amendment will only apply to State assemblies, excluding union territory assemblies except for Delhi, which was included in the amendment with a specific provision. However, Puducherry and Jammu & Kashmir union territory assemblies were not included in the amendment. In December 2023, both houses passed the Government of Union Territories (Amendment) Bill and the Jammu and Kashmir Reorganisation (Second Amendment) Bill which would extend women reservation in the union territories of Puducherry and Jammu & Kashmir.

== See also ==
- Women's political participation in India
- Women's Reservation Bill (2010)
- List of amendments of the Constitution of India
- List of acts of the Parliament of India
- Parliament of India
- Lawmaking procedure in India
