= United Women Front =

United Women Front is a political party in India founded in 2007. Suman Krishan Kant is the national president of the party. Parm Ahluwalia is the general secretary of the party.

Suman Krishan Kant, 74, was the wife of former Vice-President Krishan Kant. Suman has been at the forefront of active politics due to her in-laws' dedication to Mahatma Gandhi and her husband's political reign. Suman began her social activism in 1977 when the Mahila Dakshita Samiti (MDS) was formed. MDS was created to help women in distress who suffered from domestic and family violence.

The focus of UWF is to provide a political party that includes women. Women cannot make decisions in issues that they are affected in without having enough numbers in decision-making. UWF addresses women's illiteracy, early marriage, and tokenism in parliament, and the safety of women. The political party wants to be included in all the facets of the mainstream political scenarios while empowering women to fight for equality.

== 2008 elections ==
The UWF at first planned to have a candidate in each of the 72 seats in the Delhi Assembly elections that took place in 2008, but they only had one candidate by the time of the elections.

== 2009 elections ==
During the 2009 elections the UWF fielded six candidates (four women and two men) in the general elections.
