= Bhanwari Devi =

Indian activist

- Born: 1951 or 1952 (age 73–74)
- Known for: Vishaka Judgement
- Awards: Neerja Bhanot Memorial Award for her "extraordinary courage, conviction and commitment"

Bhanwari Devi (also spelled Bahveri Devi) is an Indian social worker from Bhaateri, Rajasthan, who was gang raped in 1992 by men angered by her efforts to prevent a child marriage in their family. Her subsequent treatment by the police, and court acquittal of the accused, attracted widespread national and international media attention, and became a landmark episode in India's women's rights movement.

== Biography ==
Bhanwari Devi belongs to a kumhar (potter) caste family and lived in Bhateri, a village in the Indian state of Rajasthan, located 55 kilometres (34 mi) from Jaipur, the state's capital. Most people of the village belonged to the Gurjar community, which is higher in the Indian caste hierarchy than that of Bhanwari's. In the 1990s child marriages were common in the village, and the caste system was dominant. Bhanwari was married to Mohan Lal Prajapat when she was around five or six years old and her husband was eight or nine. She came to live in Bhateri while still in her early teens. They have four children together; two daughters and two sons. The eldest daughter is uneducated, her two sons live and work in Jaipur, while the youngest daughter Rameshwari graduated with a Bachelor of Education degree and teaches English language at a school.

== As a saathin ==
In 1985, Bhanwari Devi became a saathin ("friend"), a grassroots worker employed as part of the Women's Development Project (WDP) run by the Government of Rajasthan. As part of her job, she took up issues related to land, water, literacy, health, Public Distribution System, and payment of minimum wages at famine relief works. In 1987, she took up a major issue of the attempted rape of a woman from a neighbouring village. All of these activities had the full support of the members of her village. However, in 1992, Bhanwari found herself alienated, when she took up the issue of child marriage which was still widely practiced in India despite being illegal.

=== Bhanwari's intervention ===
In 1992, the state government of Rajasthan decided to launch a campaign against child marriage during the fortnight preceding the annual Jain and Hindu spring festival of Akha Teej, which is considered an auspicious date for marriages. Many child marriages take place during this festival. WDP members were tasked with convincing local villagers not to conduct child marriages, a task that Bhanwari took up, along with prachetas and members of the District Women's Development Agency (DWDA). The campaign was largely ignored by the villagers and faced disapproval from local leaders, including the village headman or pradhan.

One family which had arranged such a marriage was that of Ram Karan Gurjar, who had planned to marry off his nine-month-old daughter. Bhanwari made attempts to persuade the family against carrying out their wedding plans. Since many Gujar families seemed determined to go ahead with child marriages, the Sub-Divisional Officer (SDO) and the Deputy Superintendent of Police (DSP) started making rounds of the village. On 5 May, the day of Akha Teej, the Deputy Superintendent of Police (DSP) and SDO went to Bhateri village to stop the marriage of Ram Karan Gurjar's infant daughter. While they succeeded in preventing the marriage from taking place on the day of Akha Teej, the marriage took place at 2 a.m. the next day. No police action was taken against this. However, the villagers associated the police visits with Bhanwari Devi's efforts. This resulted in social and economic boycott of Bhanwari and her family. The villagers stopped selling milk to the family or buying the earthen pots they made. Bhanwari was forced to leave her job when her employer was roughed up, while her husband was beaten up by another Gujar.

=== The gang rape ===
According to Bhanwari Devi, at dusk on 22 September 1992, while her husband and she were working in their field, five men from the dominant and affluent Gurjar caste from her village attacked her husband with sticks, leaving him unconscious. In her complaint with the police she named the five men: brothers Ram Sukh Gujjar, Gyarsa Gujjar and Ram Karan Gujjar, the latter whose infant daughter's marriage she had attempted to stop, and their uncle Badri Gujjar, along with one Shravan Sharma. She claimed that while Ram Sukh held her, Badri and Gyarsa took turns in raping her. She added that the rape occurred shortly after the said incident happened. The accused of Gurjar caste were arrested and tried in the court, but they were backed by the local MLA, Dhanraj Meena. Meena hired a lawyer called Purohit to defend the accused.

=== Police and medical procedures ===
Bhanwari reported the incident to Rasila Sharma, the pracheta (block-level worker), who took her to the Bassi police station to lodge a First Information Report (FIR). The FIR was lodged after surmounting police scepticism and indifference, a phenomenon several rape complainants have faced in the world. Scholar Savitri Goonesekere notes that all across South Asia, police are reluctant to record rape cases and show callousness and indifference towards women with complaints of rape. At the police station, Bhanwari was asked to deposit her "lehanga" (long skirt) as evidence. She had to cover herself with her husband's blood-stained saafa (turban) and walk 3 km to the nearest saathin's village Kherpuria, at about 1 a.m. in the night.

This indifference continued at the Primary Health Centre (PHC) in Bassi, where the male doctor refused to medically examine Bhanwari, while no female doctor was present. The PHC doctor referred her to Sawai Man Singh (SMS) Hospital in Jaipur, but wrote in his referral that she was being sent for a test "confirming the age of the victim."

The Medical Jurist at Jaipur refused to conduct any tests without orders from a Magistrate; the Magistrate refused to give the orders until the next day, as it was past his working hours. As a result, the vaginal swab was taken more than 48 hours after the alleged rape, although Indian law requires this to be done within 24 hours. Her scratches and bruises were not recorded, and her complaints of physical discomfort were ignored.

== Media coverage ==
On 25 September 1992, the Rajasthan Patrika, a major local newspaper, carried a small news item stating that a woman from Bhateri village had registered an FIR in Bassi thana (police station) alleging gang rape. Following this, a number of local Hindi dailies as well as national dailies reported the incident. On 2 October, the Rajasthan Patrika carried an editorial article Kroor Hadsa ("Brutal Incident") condemning the incident. Soon after this, many Jaipur-based women's groups and other social organizations began making inquiries about it. However, Bhanwari Devi was accused of fabricating the entire incident by the alleged rapists and their supporters, and faced public humiliation in her village. Bhanwari Devi refused monetary compensation to discourage such allegations.

== The court case ==
=== Summary of evidence ===
The summary of evidence in the court case stated that:

- The semen of five different men were indeed found in Bhanwari's vaginal swab and upon her lehenga (long skirt)
- There was match between of these five semen traces and the semen of any of the five accused (including two who she had accused of raping her and three whom she had accused of pinning her down).
- Bhanwari's husband's semen was not found in the vaginal swab (none of the five semen traces were his).

=== District court judgment ===
In its verdict on 15 November 1995, the district and sessions court in Jaipur dismissed the case and acquitted all the five accused. Five judges were changed, and it was the sixth judge who ruled that the accused were not guilty, stating inter alia that Bhanwari's husband couldn't have passively watched his wife being gang-raped.

Under pressure from women's groups, the State Government decided to appeal against the judgment. The judgement led to a nationwide campaign for justice for Bhanwari Devi. However, by 2007, 15 years after the incident, the Rajasthan High Court held only one hearing on the case and two of the accused were dead.

=== Criticism of the judgment ===
Women's activists were critical of some of the judicial remarks made in the case. The judgment stated in passing that Bhanwari's husband couldn't have passively watched his wife being gang-raped. This was taken as prejudice and bias by the women's groups. The accused included an uncle-nephew pair, and the judge said that a middle-aged man from an Indian village could not possibly have participated in a gang rape in the presence of his own nephew.

== Aftermath ==
A state MLA belonging to the Bharatiya Janata Party, Kanhaiya Lal Meena, organised a victory rally in the state capital Jaipur for the five accused who were now declared not guilty, and the women's wing of his political party attended the rally to call Bhanwari a liar.

=== Social boycott ===
Bhanwari and her family were ostracized by villagers in Bhateri and by members of her own caste living elsewhere. When her mother died, her brothers and others did not allow her to participate in the funeral. Following this incident, Bhanwari handed over to them the sum of ₹25,000 which she had received from Prime Minister Narasimha Rao. Her brothers spent this money on organizing a Kumhar caste panchayat, where people were asked to accept her back into the community. In spite of this effort, her acceptance in the community remained nominal and her son Mukesh had a difficult time finding a family willing to give their daughter in marriage to him.

The New Indian Express journalist Sukhmani Singh interviewed Bhanwari in 2001 and reported: "Feisty, outspoken, innately hospitable, she openly expressed her resentment against both the women's groups and the government, all of whom have been fiercely guarding her like their pet mannequin all these many years." He reported that she was "weary, resigned and bitter" after all these years. He also reported that Bhanwari wanted to leave Bhateri, but couldn't afford to do so. Her sole source of income was a buffalo, as her two bighas of land had become unproductive due to three years of drought. Most of the money that she received as part of the Neerja Bhanot Memorial Award in 1994 was locked away in a trust to aid women.

=== Official honours ===
Bhanwari received honours both nationally and internationally. She was invited to be a part of the United Nations Fourth World Conference on Women in Beijing. In 1994, she was awarded the Neerja Bhanot Memorial Award carrying ₹1 lakh cash prize, for her "extraordinary courage, conviction and commitment".

In 2002, the then-Chief Minister of Rajasthan, Ashok Gehlot, allotted a residential plot to Bhanwari Devi and announced a grant of ₹40,000 for construction of a house on the plot. He also sanctioned an additional amount ₹10,000 for the education of her son.

== Impact ==
Bhanwari's case shaped the women's movement in India. The Bhanwari case is said by some to have encouraged more rape victims to prosecute their rapists.

By 2007, the average age of the first-time mother in Rajasthan had gone up to 16.4 years. This change was brought about by the efforts of women's groups, catalyzed by the Bhanwari case.

=== The Vishaka judgment ===
Women's activists and lawyers have propagated the view that Bhanwari attracted the ire of her rapists solely on the basis of her work. A number of groups which championed the latter view filed a Public Interest Litigation (PIL) in the Supreme Court of India, under the collective platform of Vishakha. The petition, filed by Vishakha and four other women's organizations in Rajasthan against the State of Rajasthan and the Union of India, resulted in what are popularly known as the Vishakha Guidelines. The judgment of August 1997 provided the basic definitions of sexual harassment at the workplace and provided guidelines to deal with it. It is seen as a significant legal victory for women's groups in India.

== In films ==
In 2000, Jag Mundhra released a film, Bawandar, based on Bhanwari's story.

== See also ==
- Women in India
