= Third Amendment =

Third Amendment may refer to the:

- 2004 Arkansas Amendment 3, constitutional ban on same-sex marriage, civil unions and civil union equivalents in the Arkansas Constitution
- 2024 Missouri Amendment 3, a proposed amendment to the Missouri constitution to legalize abortion before fetal viability
- 2024 Florida Amendment 3. a proposed amendment to the Florida constitution to legalize possession, purchase, and recreational use of cannabis for adults 21 years or older.
- Third Amendment to the United States Constitution, part of the Bill of Rights, limiting the quartering of troops in civilian homes by the U.S. government
- Third Amendment of the Constitution of India, 1954 amendment relating to state and centre (federal) rights
- Third Amendment of the Constitution of Ireland, permitted the state to join the European Communities and provided that European law would take precedence over the constitution
  - Third Amendment of the Constitution Bill 1958, a failed amendment of the Constitution of Ireland concerning the electoral system
  - Third Amendment of the Constitution Bill 1968, a failed amendment of the Constitution of Ireland concerning apportionment
- Third Amendment of the Constitution of South Africa, which allowed the creation of municipalities that crossed provincial boundaries
- Australian referendum, 1928 (State Debts), the third amendment to the Constitution of Australia
- Utah Constitutional Amendment 3, constitutional ban on same-sex marriage, civil unions and civil union equivalents in the Utah Constitution
