= Eleventh Amendment of the Constitution of India =

The Constitution (Eleventh Amendment) Act, 1961

Parliament of India
- Long title: An Act further to amend the Constitution of India.
- Citation: 11th Amendment
- Territorial extent: India
- Passed by: Lok Sabha
- Passed: 5 December 1961
- Passed by: Rajya Sabha
- Passed: 12 December 1961
- Assented to: 19 December 1961
- Commenced: 19 December 1961

Legislative history

First chamber: Lok Sabha
- Bill title: Constitution (Eleventh Amendment) Bill, 1961
- Introduced by: Ashoke Kumar Sen
- Introduced: 30 November 1961
- Status: In force

The Eleventh Amendment of the Constitution of India, officially known as The Constitution (Eleventh Amendment) Act, 1961, provided that the vice-president shall be elected by the members of an electoral college consisting of the members of both Houses of Parliament, thereby dispensing with the earlier requirement of a joint meeting of members of both Houses of Parliament assembled for the said purpose. The 11th Amendment inserted a new clause (4) in article 71 of the Constitution to clarify that the election of the president or vice-president cannot be challenged on the ground of the existence of any vacancy for whatever reason in the appropriate electoral college.

== Text ==
BE it enacted by Parliament in the Twelfth Year of the Republic of India as follows:—

1. Short title This Act may be called the Constitution (Eleventh Amendment) Act, 1961

2. Amendment of article 66 In article 66 of the Constitution, in clause (1), for the words "members of both Houses of Parliament assembled at a joint meeting", the words "members of an electoral college consisting of the members of the House of Parliament" shall be substituted.

3. Amendment of article 71 In article 71 of the Constitution, after clause (3), the following clause shall be inserted, namely:—

"(4) The election of a person as President or Vice-President shall not be called in question on the ground of the existence of any vacancy for whatever reason among the members of the electoral college electing him".

The full text of clause (1) of article 66, after the 11th Amendment is given below:

66. Election of Vice-President (1) The Vice-President shall be elected by the ~~members of both Houses of Parliament assembled at a joint meeting~~ members of an electoral college consisting of the members of the House of Parliament in accordance with the system of proportional representation by means of the single transferable vote and the voting at such election shall be by secret ballot.

== Proposal and enactment ==
The Constitution (Eleventh Amendment) Bill, 1961 (Bill No. 66 of 1961) was introduced in the Lok Sabha on 30 November 1961. It was introduced by Ashoke Kumar Sen, then Minister of Law, and sought to amend articles 66 and 71 of the Constitution. The full text of the Statement of Objects and Reasons appended to the bill is given below: The full text of the Statement of Objects and Reasons appended to the bill is given below:

Under article 66(1) of the Constitution, the Vice-President has to be elected by members of both Houses of Parliament assembled at a joint meeting. The requirement that members of the two Houses should assemble at a joint sitting for the election of the Vice-President seems to be totally unnecessary and may also cause practical difficulties. It is, therefore, proposed to amend this article to provide that the Vice-President will be elected by members of an electoral college consisting of members of both Houses of Parliament. Under article 54 of the Constitution, the President is elected by an electoral college consisting of the elected members of both Houses of Parliament and of the Legislative Assemblies of the States. Every effort is made to complete such elections before the date of the Presidential election. It is, however, possible that the elections to the two Houses of Parliament may not be completed before the President or the Vice-President is elected. It is, therefore, proposed to amend article 71 of the Constitution so as to make it clear that the election of the President or the Vice-President cannot be challenged on the ground of any vacancy for any reason in the appropriate electoral college.

2. The Bill seeks to achieve these objects. The notes on clauses appended to the Bill explain the provisions thereof.

— A.K. Sen, "The Constitution (Eleventh Amendment) Bill, 1961". This article incorporates text from this source, which is in the public domain.

The bill was debated and passed in the original form by the Lok Sabha on 5 December 1961. It was considered and passed by the Rajya Sabha on 12 December 1961. The bill received assent from President Rajendra Prasad on 19 December 1961, and came into force on the same date. It was notified in The Gazette of India on 20 December 1961.

== See also ==
- List of amendments of the Constitution of India
