= Fifth Amendment =

Fifth Amendment may refer to:

- Fifth Amendment to the United States Constitution, part of the Bill of Rights, which protects against the abuse of government authority in legal proceedings
- Fifth Amendment of the Constitution of India, 1955 amendment relating to time limits on state opinions to the central (federal) government as to their boundaries etc.
- Fifth Amendment of the Constitution of Ireland, a referendum related to the Roman Catholic Church and other religious denominations
- Australian referendum, 1967 (Aboriginals), the fifth amendment to the Constitution of Australia, regarding the constitutional position of Indigenous Australians
- Fifth Amendment of the Constitution of South Africa, which made technical changes relating to the election of the National Assembly and the structure of the Financial and Fiscal Commission
- Fifth Amendment to the Constitution of Pakistan
- Fifth Amendment, album by The Vibrators
