= Sarpanch =

Title of the elected head of a village in India

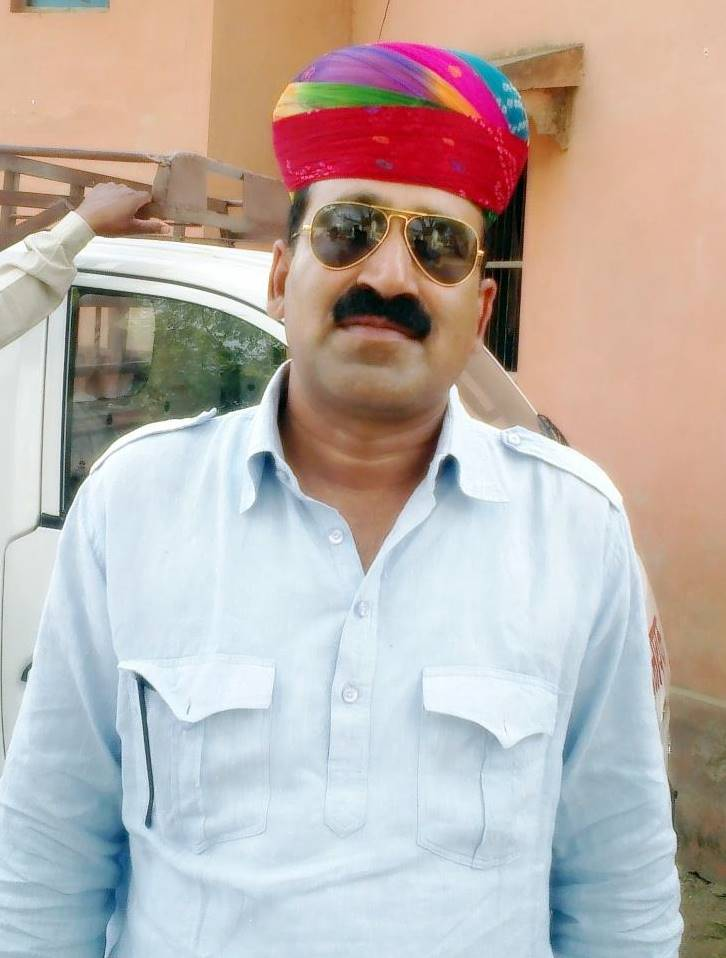
A Sarpanch in Rajasthan

A sarpanch, gram pradhan, mukhiya or president is an elected decision-maker, who heads the village-level constitutional body of local self-government called the Gram Panchayat (village government) in India. The sarpanch, together with other elected panchayat members (referred to as ward panchs or ward members), constitutes the Gram Panchayats. The sarpanch is the focal point of contact between government officers and the village community and holds office for a term of five years. The term used to refer to the sarpanch can vary across different states of India. There are many commonly used terms for sarpanch in various states: Panchayat President, Gram Pramukh, Gram Pradhan, Gram Adhyaksha, Gaon Panchayat President and, Gram Panchayat President.

== Meaning of sarpanch ==
The term sarpanch is derived from the words sar (meaning "head" or "chief") and panch (meaning "five"), referring historically to the head of a traditional council of five members (panch). In contemporary India, the term denotes the elected head of a Gram Panchayat, the village-level institution of local self-government. In West Bengal, a sarpanch is called as the Panchayat Pradhan ("chief"), while the deputy is called the Panchyat Upa-Pradhan.

=== Nomenclature ===
A sarpanch is a term used to refer to the elected head of a village-level statutory institution called the Gram Panchayat, Village Panchayat or Gram Parishad.

However, the term used to refer to the sarpanch can vary across different states of India. Here are some of the commonly used terms for sarpanch in various states:

- Gram Pradhan -

Uttar Pradesh, Uttarakhand, and some parts of Haryana, Punjab.

- Sarpanch -

Rajasthan, Maharashtra, Gujarat, and Andhra Pradesh, Telangana, Jammu and Kashmir, Punjab, Madhya Pradesh, Odisha.

- Panchayat President -

Karnataka, Tamil Nadu, Kerala, and West Bengal.

- Mandal Praja Parishad President -

Andhra Pradesh and Telangana.

- Mukhiya -

Bihar, Jharkhand.

- Gaon Panchayat President -

Assam.

== Roles and responsibilities ==
A sarpanch performs a number of administrative duties. The Sarpanch (president) is the elected head of a Gram Panchayat, while the Secretary serves as its administrative officer, appointed by the state government.

== Eligibility ==
A sarpanch must be a citizen of at least 21 years of age, and have no legal convictions, among other requirements.

== Tenure ==
The tenure of a sarpanch in India is five years.

== Panchayati raj ==
India's federal system of governance means that different states have different laws governing the powers of the Gram Panchayatss and sarpanches.

=== Panchayat elections ===
In many states, elections were not held for decades and instead of elected sarpanches, the Gram Panchayats were run by bureaucratically appointed beureaucrats. Following the enactment of the 73rd and 74th Constitutional Amendments in 1992, several safeguards were introduced, including provisions mandating regular elections.

=== Reservation for women ===
Article 243D(3) of the 73rd Constitutional Amendment requires one-third of all seats in panchayats and one-third of panchayat chairperson positions be reserved for women, across all three levels of the Panchayati Raj system. This amendment followed various state-level legislative reforms in which reservations were set for panchayat positions to be held by women.
