= Fourteenth Amendment of the Constitution of India =

The Constitution (Fourteenth Amendment) Act, 1962

Parliament of India
- Long title: An Act further to amend the Constitution of India.
- Citation: 14th Amendment
- Territorial extent: India
- Passed by: Lok Sabha
- Passed: 4 September 1962
- Passed by: Rajya Sabha
- Passed: 7 September 1962
- Assented to: 28 December 1962
- Commenced: 28 December 1962

Legislative history

First chamber: Lok Sabha
- Bill title: Constitution (Fourteenth Amendment) Bill, 1962
- Introduced by: Lal Bahadur Shastri
- Introduced: 30 August 1962

Summary
- Incorporated Pondicherry as the ninth union territory of India. Also empowered Parliament to create by law, Legislatures and Councils of Ministers for the Union territories of Himachal Pradesh, Manipur, Tripura, Goa, Daman and Diu and Pondicherry.
- Status: In force

The Fourteenth Amendment of the Constitution of India, officially known as The Constitution (Fourteenth Amendment) Act, 1962, incorporated Pondicherry (now Puducherry) as the ninth union territory of India, and also gave Parliament the authority to create by law, Legislatures and Councils of Ministers for the Union territories of Himachal Pradesh, Manipur, Tripura, Goa, Daman and Diu and Puducherry.

The French establishments of Pondicherry, Karikal, Mahé and Yanam became territories of the Indian Union on 16 August 1962, with the ratification of the Treaty of Cession by India and France. The 14th Amendment came into effect on 28 December 1962.

== Text ==
BE it enacted by Parliament in the Thirteenth Year of the Republic of India as follows:—

1. Short title This Act may be called the Constitution (Fourteenth Amendment) Act, 1962.

2. Amendment of article 81 In article 81 of the Constitution, in sub-clause (b) of clause (1), for the words "twenty members", the words "twenty-five members" shall be substituted.

3. Amendment of the First Schedule In the First Schedule to the Constitution, under the heading "II. THE UNION TERRITORIES", after entry 8, the following entry shall be inserted, namely:—

"9. Pondicherry – The territories which immediately before the sixteenth day of August 1962, were comprised in the French Establishment in India known as Pondicherry, Karikal, Mahe and Yanam".

4. Insertion of new article 239A After article 239 of the Constitution, the following article shall be inserted, namely:—

"239A. Creation of local Legislatures or Council of Ministers or both for certain Union territories.
(1) Parliament may by law create for any of the Union territories of Himachal Pradesh, Manipur, Tripura, Goa, Daman and Diu, and Pondicherry—

(a) a body, whether elected or partly nominated and partly elected, to function as a Legislature for the Union territory, or
(b) a Council of Ministers, or both with such constitution, powers and functions, in each case, as may be specified in the law.

(2) Any such law as is referred to in clause (1) shall not be deemed to be an amendment of this Constitution for the purpose of article 368 notwithstanding that it contains any provision which amends or has the effect of amending this Constitution".

5. Amendment of article 240 In article 240 of the Constitution in clause (1) —

(a) after entry (d), the following entry shall be inserted, namely:—

"(e) Pondicherry";

(b) the following proviso shall be inserted at the end, namely:—
"Provided that when any body is created under article 239A to function as a Legislature for the Union territory of Goa, Daman and Diu or Pondicherry, the President shall not make any regulation for the peace, progress and good government of that Union territory with effect from the date appointed for the first meeting of the Legislature."

6. Amendment of the Fourth Schedule In the Fourth Schedule to the Constitution, in the Table —

(a) after entry 20, the entry, "21. Pondicherry. I" shall be inserted;
(b) for the figures "225", the figures "226" shall be substituted.

== Constitutional changes ==
Section 2 of the amendment amended article 81(1) (b) of the Constitution in order to raise the maximum number of seats in the Lok Sabha for members representing the Union territories from 20 to 25, thus enabling representation to be given to the Union territory of Pondicherry. The First Schedule to the Constitution was amended to include the territories of Pondicherry with effect from 16 August 1962. The Fourth Schedule to the Constitution was amended to allocate one seat in Rajya Sabha to the Union territory of Pondicherry.

The insertion of a new article 239A in the Constitution gave Parliament the authority to create by law, Legislatures and Councils of Ministers for the Union territories of Himachal Pradesh, Manipur, Tripura, Goa, Daman and Diu and Pondicherry. Section 4 of the Amendment provided that any law passed for this purpose would not be deemed to be an amendment of the Constitution for the purpose of article 368. Clause (1) of article 240 of the Constitution was amended to include the Union territory of Pondicherry in order to enable the President to "make regulations for the peace, progress and good government" of the territory. However, the President would cease to make regulations, when any body is created under the new article 239A to function as a Legislature for Union territories of Goa, Daman and Diu or Pondicherry, with effect from the date appointed for the first meeting of such Legislature.

== Proposal and enactment ==
The Constitution (Fourteenth Amendment) Bill, 1962 (Bill No. 86 of 1962) was introduced in the Lok Sabha on 30 August 1962. It was introduced by Lal Bahadur Shastri, then Minister of Home Affairs, and sought to amend articles 81 and 240, and the First and the Fourth Schedules to the Constitution. It also sought to insert a new article 239A in the Constitution. The full text of the Statement of Objects and Reasons appended to the bill is given below:

With the ratification of the Treaty of Cession by the Governments of India and France, on the 16th August, 1962, the French establishments of Pondicherry, Karikal, Mahe and Yanam became territories of the Indian Union with effect from that date. This Bill provides for these territories being specified in the Constitution itself as a Union territory called 'Pondicherry'. Under article 81(1)(b) of the Constitution, not more than twenty members are to represent the Union territories in the House of the People. This maximum has already been reached. The Bill accordingly seeks to increase this number to twenty-five to enable representation being given immediately to Pondicherry in the House of the People and to provide for future contingencies. The Bill also provides for representation of the territory in the Council of States.

It is proposed to create Legislatures and Councils of Ministers in the Union territories of Himanchal Pradesh, Manipur, Tripura, Goa, Daman and Diu and Pondicherry broadly on the pattern of the scheme which was in force in some of the Part C States before the reorganisation of the States. The Bill seeks to confer necessary legislative power on Parliament to enact laws for this purpose through a new article 239A which follows generally the provisions of article 240 as it stood before the reorganisation of the States.

— Lal Bahadur Shashtri, "The Constitution (Fourteenth Amendment) Bill, 1962". This article incorporates text from this source, which is in the public domain.

The bill was considered and passed, with some modifications, by the Lok Sabha on 4 September 1962. The bill passed by the Lok Sabha, was debated and passed by the Rajya Sabha on 7 September 1962. Clauses 1, 2, 3 and 5 to 7 of the Bill were adopted, in the original form, by the Lok Sabha and the Rajya Sabha on 4 and 7 September 1962, respectively. Clause 4 of the Bill sought to insert a new article 239A in the Constitution, which would empower Parliament to create by law, Legislatures and Councils of Ministers for certain Union territories. Hari Vishnu Kamath moved an amendment to Clause 4 in the Lok Sabha, which sought to omit the words "nominated or" after the word "whether" in clause 1(a) of the new article 239A, be omitted. The amended Clause 4 was adopted by the Lok Sabha, and later by the Rajya Sabha. The effect of the amendment was that the Legislatures of the Union territories could not be wholly nominated bodies.

The bill received assent from then President Sarvepalli Radhakrishnan on 28 December 1962, and came into force on the same date. It was notified in The Gazette of India on 29 December 1962.

== Ratification ==
The Act was passed in accordance with the provisions of Article 368 of the Constitution, and was ratified by half of the State Legislatures, as required under Clause (2) of the said article. State Legislatures that ratified the amendment are listed below:

1. Andhra Pradesh
2. Jammu and Kashmir
3. Kerala
4. Madras
5. Maharashtra
6. Mysore
7. East Punjab
8. Rajasthan
9. Uttar Pradesh
10. West Bengal

Did not ratify:

1. Assam
2. Bihar
3. Gujarat
4. Madhya Pradesh
5. Orissa

== See also ==
- List of amendments of the Constitution of India
