= Forty-first Amendment of the Constitution of India =

The Constitution (Forty-first Amendment) Act, 1976

Parliament of India
- Long title: An Act further to amend the Constitution of India.
- Citation: 41st Amendment
- Territorial extent: India
- Passed by: Lok Sabha
- Passed: 30 August 1976
- Passed by: Rajya Sabha
- Passed: 1 September 1976
- Assented to: 7 September 1976
- Commenced: 7 September 1976

Legislative history

Initiating chamber: Lok Sabha
- Bill title: Constitution (Forty-third Amendment) Bill, 1976
- Introduced by: Om Mehta
- Introduced: 26 August 1976

Summary
- Changed the age of retirement of the Chairman and members of the Public Service Commissions from 60 to 62 years
- Status: In force

The Forty-first Amendment of the Constitution of India, officially known as The Constitution (Forty-first Amendment) Act, 1976, changed the age of retirement of the Chairman and members of the State Public Service Commissions from 60 to 62 years, by amending article 316(2) of the Constitution.

== Text ==
BE it enacted by Parliament in the Twenty-seventh Year of the Republic of India as follows:—

1. Short title This Act may be called the Constitution (Forty-first Amendment) Act, 1976.

2. Amendment of article 316 In article 316 of the Constitution, in clause (2) for the words "sixty years", the words "sixty-two years" shall be substituted.

The relevant amended text of clause (2) of article 316, after the 41st Amendment, is given below:

316. Appointment and term of office of members. (2) A member of a Public Service Commission shall hold office for a term of six years from the date on which he enters upon his office or until he attains, in the case of the Union Commission, the age of sixty-five years, and in the case of a State Commission or a Joint Commission, the age of ~~sixty years~~ sixty-two years, whichever is earlier:

== Proposal and enactment ==
The Constitution (Forty-first Amendment) Act, 1976 was introduced in the Lok Sabha on 26 August 1976, as the Constitution (Forty-third Amendment) Bill, 1976 (Bill No. 85 of 1976). It was introduced by Om Mehta, then Minister of State in the Ministry of Home Affairs, Department of Personnel and Administrative Reforms and Department of Parliamentary Affairs, and sought to amend article 316 of the Constitution. The full text of the Statement of Objects and Reasons appended to the bill is given below:

Article 316(2) of the Constitution provides that the Chairman and Members of a State Public Service Commission or Joint Commission shall retire at 58 or hold office for a term of six years from the date on which they enter service, whichever is earlier. This was the position when the Constitution came into force. Subsequently, while the age of retirement of the High Court Judges was changed to 58, that of the Chairman and the Members of the State Public Service Commissions remained unchanged.

The same article provides that one-half of the members of every Public Service Commission shall be employees of the Government of India or the Government of a State. The age of retirement of Government employees was 55 originally but was later changed to 58 in the case of All-India Services, Central Government servants and the Government servants of several States. Membership of the Commission is no attraction, therefore, to them, as they will have only two years to serve on the Commission which position is not desirable from the point of view of the efficient functioning of the Commission.

Academics like University Professors are eligible for appointment to the State Public Service Commissions. The age of retirement of University Professors has been recently changed to 58. It will not be attractive for these academics to serve on a Public Service Commission if the age of retirement remains sixty. The Chairman/Members of a State Public Service Commission are forbidden to serve under the Government of India or a State Government after retirement. Consequently, no eminent academic will be eager to accept appointment on the Commission unless the age of retirement is changed to 62.

The proposal is to raise the age of retirement of the Chairman and Members of the State Public Service Commissions to 62. The Bill seeks to give effect to this proposal.

— Om Mehta, "The Constitution (Forty-third Amendment) Bill, 1976". This article incorporates text from this source, which is in the public domain.

The Bill was considered by the Lok Sabha on 30 August 1976 and passed on the same day, with a formal amendment replacing the word "Forty-third"” by the word "Forty-first" in clause 1. The Bill, as passed by the Lok Sabha, was considered and passed by the Rajya Sabha on 1 September 1976. The bill received assent from then President Fakhruddin Ali Ahmed on 7 September 1976, and came into force on the same day. It was notified in The Gazette of India on 9 September 1976.

== See also ==
- List of amendments of the Constitution of India
