= Twentieth Amendment of the Constitution of India =

Amended appointment validation

The Constitution (Twentieth Amendment) Act, 1966

Parliament of India
- Long title: An Act further to amend the Constitution of India.
- Citation: 20th Amendment
- Territorial extent: India
- Passed by: Lok Sabha
- Passed: 3 December 1966
- Passed by: Rajya Sabha
- Passed: 9 December 1966
- Assented to: 3 December 1966
- Commenced: 3 December 1966

Legislative history

First chamber: Lok Sabha
- Bill title: Constitution (Twenty-third Amendment) Bill, 1966
- Introduced by: Yashwantrao Chavan
- Introduced: 25 November 1966

Summary
- Validated the appointments, postings, promotions, and transfers of and judgements, delivered before the commencement of the present Act, by district judges who were appointed, posted, promoted, or transferred as a district judge in any State otherwise than in accordance with the provisions of article 233 or article 235 of the Constitution.
- Status: In force

The Twentieth Amendment of the Constitution of India, officially known as The Constitution (Twentieth Amendment) Act, 1966, inserted a new article 233A inter alia validating the appointments, postings, promotions, and transfers of and judgements, delivered before the commencement of the present Act, by district judges who were appointed, posted, promoted or transferred as a district judge in any State otherwise than in accordance with the provisions of article 233 or article 235 of the Constitution.

== Text ==
BE it enacted by Parliament in the Seventeenth Year of the Republic of India as follows:—

1. Short title This Act may be called the Constitution (Twentieth Amendment) Act, 1966.

2. Insertion of new article 233A After article 233 of the Constitution, the following article shall be inserted, namely:—
"233A. Validation of appointments of, and judgements etc., delivered by, certain district judges.
Notwithstanding any judgment, decree or order of any court—

(a) (i) no appointment of any person already in the Judicial service of a State or of any person who has been for not less than seven years an advocate or a pleader, to be a district judge in that State, and
(ii) no posting, promotion or transfer of any such person as a district judge, made at any time before the commencement of the Constitution (Twentieth Amendment) Act, 1966, otherwise that in accordance with the provisions of article 233 or article 235 shall be deemed to be illegal or void or ever to have become illegal or void by reason only of the fact that such appointment, posting, promotion or transfer was not made in accordance with the said provisions;
(b) no jurisdiction exercised, no judgment, decree, sentence or order passed or made, and no other act or proceeding done or taken, before the commencement of the Constitution (Twentieth Amendment) Act, 1966 by, or before, any person appointed, posted, promoted or transferred as a district judge in any State otherwise than in accordance with the provisions of article 233 or article 235 shall be deemed to be illegal or invalid or ever to have become illegal or invalid by reason only of the fact that such appointment, posting, promotion or transfer was not made in accordance with the said provisions."

== Proposal and enactment ==
The Constitution (Twentieth Amendment) Act, 1966 was introduced in the Lok Sabha on 25 November 1966, as the Constitution (Twenty-third Amendment) Bill, 1966 (Bill No. 89 of 1966). It was introduced by Yashwantrao Chavan, then Minister of Home Affairs, and sought to insert a new article 233A in the Constitution. The full text of the Statement of Objects and Reasons appended to the bill is given below:

Appointment of district judges in Uttar Pradesh and a few other States have been rendered invalid and illegal by a recent judgment of the Supreme Court on the ground that such appointments were not made in accordance with the provisions of article 233 of the Constitution. In another judgment, the Supreme Court had held that the power of posting of a district judge under article 233 does not include the power of transfer of such judge from one station to another and that the power of transfer of a district judge is vested in the High Court under article 235 of the Constitution. As a result of these judgments, a serious situation has arisen because doubt has been thrown on the validity of the judgments, decrees, orders and sentences passed or made by these district judges and a number of writ petitions and other cases have already been filed challenging their validity. The functioning of the district courts in Uttar Pradesh has practically come to a standstill. It is, therefore, urgently necessary to validate the judgments, decrees, orders and sentences passed or made heretofore by all such district judges in those States and also to validate the appointment, posting, promotion and transfer of such district judges barring those few who were not eligible for appointment under article 233.

2. The Bill seeks to give effect to the above proposals.

— Y.B. Chavan, "The Constitution (Twenty-third Amendment) Bill, 1966".

The Bill was debated and passed by the Lok Sabha on 3 December 1966, with only formal amendments to replace the word "Twenty third" by the word "Twentieth" in the short title as well as in the proposed new article 233A. The Bill was considered and passed by the Rajya Sabha on 9 December 1966. The bill received assent from then President Zakir Husain on 22 December 1966, and came into force on the same date. It was notified in The Gazette of India on 23 December 1966.

== See also ==
- List of amendments of the Constitution of India
