= Twenty-second Amendment of the Constitution of India =

1969 amendment in India on autonomy

The Constitution (Twenty-second Amendment) Act, 1969

Parliament of India
- Long title: An Act further to amend the Constitution of India.
- Citation: 22nd Amendment
- Territorial extent: India
- Passed by: Lok Sabha
- Passed: 15 April 1969
- Passed by: Rajya Sabha
- Passed: 30 April 1969
- Assented to: 25 September 1969
- Commenced: 25 September 1969

Legislative history

Initiating chamber: Lok Sabha
- Bill title: Constitution (Twenty-second Amendment) Bill, 1969
- Introduced by: Yashwantrao Chavan
- Introduced: 10 April 1969

Summary
- Empowered Parliament to enact a law for constituting an autonomous State within the State of Assam, and also to provide the autonomous State with Legislature or a Council of Ministers or both with such powers and functions as may be defined by that law.

The Twenty-second Amendment of the Constitution of India, officially known as The Constitution (Twenty-second Amendment) Act, 1969, inserted new article 244A in the Constitution to empower Parliament to enact a law for constituting an autonomous State within the State of Assam and also to provide the autonomous State with Legislature or a Council of Ministers or both with such powers and functions as may be defined by that law.

The 22nd Amendment amended article 275 in regard to sums and grants payable to the autonomous State on and from its formation under article 244A. It also inserted new article 371B which provided for constitution and functions of a committee of the Legislative Assembly of the State of Assam consisting of members of that Assembly elected from the tribal areas specified in Part A of the Table appended to Paragraph 20 of the Sixth Schedule, and such number of other members of that Assembly as may be specified in the order.

== Text ==
BE it enacted by Parliament in the Twentieth Year of the Republic of India as follows:—

1. Short title This Act may be called the Constitution (Twenty-second Amendment) Act, 1969.

2. Insertion of new article 244A In Part X of the Constitution, after article 244, the following article shall be inserted, namely:—
"244A. Formation of an autonomous State comprising certain tribal areas in Assam and creation of local Legislature or Council of Ministers or both therefor.

(1) Notwithstanding anything in this Constitution, Parliament may, by law, form within the State of Assam an autonomous State comprising (Whether wholly or in part) all or any of the tribal areas specified in Part A of the table appended to paragraph 20 of the Sixth Schedule and create therefor—

(a) a body, whether elected or partly nominated and partly elected, to function as a Legislature for the autonomous State, or
(b) a Council of Ministers, or both with such constitution, powers and functions, in each case, as may be specified in the law

(2) Any such law as is referred to in clause (1) may, in particular—

(a) specify the matters enumerated in the State List or the Concurrent List with respect to which the Legislature of the autonomous State shall have power to make laws for the whole or any part thereof, whether to the exclusion of the Legislature of the State of Assam or otherwise;
(b) define the matters with respect to which the executive power of the autonomous State shall extend;
(c) provide that any tax levied by the State of Assam shall be assigned to the autonomous State in so far as the proceeds thereof are attributable to the autonomous State;
(d) provide that any reference to a State in any article of this Constitution shall be construed as including a reference to the autonomous State; and
(e) make such supplemental, incidental and consequential provisions as may be deemed necessary.

(3) An amendment of any such law as aforesaid in so far as such amendment relates to any of the matters specified in sub-clause (a) or sub-clause (b) of clause (2) shall have no effect unless the amendment is passed in each House of Parliament by not less than two-thirds of the members present and voting.
(4) Any such law as is referred to in this article shall not be deemed to be an amendment of this Constitution for the purposes of article 368 notwithstanding that it contains any provision which amends or has the effect of amending this Constitution".

3. Amendment of article 275 In article 275 of the Constitution, after clause (1), the following clause shall be inserted, namely:—
"(1A) On and from the formation of the autonomous State under article 244A—

(i) any sums payable under clause (a) of the second proviso to clause (1) shall, if the autonomous State comprises all the tribal areas referred to therein, be paid to the autonomous State, and, if the autonomous State comprises only some of those tribal areas, be apportioned between the State of Assam and the autonomous State as the President may, by order, specify;
(ii) there shall be paid out of the Consolidated Fund of India as grant-in-aid of the revenues of the autonomous State sums, capital and recurring equivalent to the costs of such schemes of development as may be undertaken by the autonomous State with the approval of the Government of India for the purpose of raising the level of administration of that State to that of the administration of the rest of the State of Assam".

4. Insertion of new article 371B After article 371A of the Constitution the following article shall be inserted, namely:—
"371B. Special provision with respect to the State of Assam.

Notwithstanding anything in this Constitution, the President may, by order made with respect to the State of Assam, provide for the constitution and functions of a committee of the Legislative Assembly of the State consisting of members of that Assembly elected from the tribal areas specified in Part A of the table appended to paragraph 20 of the Sixth Schedule and such number of other members of that Assembly as may be specified in the order and for the modifications to be made in the rules of procedure of that Assembly for the constitution and proper functioning of such committee".

== Constitutional changes ==
Section 2 of the 22nd Amendment inserted new article 244A in the Constitution to empower Parliament to enact a law for constituting an autonomous State within the State of Assam and also to provide the autonomous State with Legislature or a Council of Ministers or both with such powers and functions as may be defined by that law.

Section 3 of the 22nd Amendment amended article 275 in regard to sums and grants payable to the autonomous State on and from its formation under article 244A. Section 4 inserted new article 371B which provided for constitution and functions of a committee of the Legislative Assembly of the State of Assam consisting of members of that Assembly elected from the tribal areas specified in Part A of the Table appended to Paragraph 20 of the Sixth Schedule and such number of other members of that Assembly as may be specified in the order.

== Proposal and enactment ==
The Constitution (Twenty-second Amendment) Bill, 1968, (Bill No. 113 of 1968) was introduced in the Lok Sabha on 10 December 1968. It was introduced by Yashwantrao Chavan, then Minister of Home Affairs, and sought to amend article 275 and insert new articles 244A and 371B in the Constitution. The full text of the Statement of Objects and Reasons appended to the bill is given below:

On the 11th September, 1968, the Government of India announced the broad details of the scheme for constituting within the State of Assam an autonomous State comprising certain areas specified in Part A of the table appended to paragraph 20 of the Sixth Schedule to the Constitution. Clause 2 of the Bill seeks to insert a new article 244A in the Constitution to confer the necessary legislative power on Parliament to enact a law for constituting the autonomous State and also to provide the autonomous State with a Legislature and a Council of Ministers with such powers and functions as may be defined by that law.

Clause 3 of the Bill makes a consequential amendment to article 275 in regard to certain special grants payable to the State of Assam in respect of the areas which may form part of the autonomous State.

Clause 4 of the Bill provides for the constitution of a committee of the Assam Legislative Assembly consisting of members of that Assembly from the tribal areas aforesaid and a few other members of that Assembly, as envisaged in the scheme.

— Y.B. Chavan, "The Constitution (Twenty-second Amendment) Bill, 1968".

A motion was moved in the Lok Sabha on 20 December 1968, adopted on the same day and concurred in by the Rajya Sabha on 28 December 1968, to refer the Bill was to a Joint Committee of the Houses of Parliament. The Report of the Joint Committee on the Bill was presented to the Lok Sabha on 12 March 1969 . The Committee suggested certain amendments in the Enacting Formula and clauses 1 and 3 of the Bill. The Bill, as reported by the Joint Committee, was withdrawn on 2 April 1969, by leave of the House.

The Constitution (Twenty-second Amendment) Bill, 1969 (Bill No. 34 of 1969) was introduced in the Lok Sabha on 10 April 1969 . It was introduced by Chavan, and like the previous bill, sought to amend article 275 and insert new articles 244A and 371B in the Constitution. The Bill was considered and passed in the original form by the Lok Sabha on 15 April 1969, and the Rajya Sabha on 30 April 1969 The bill received assent from then President Varahagiri Venkata Giri on 25 September 1969, and came into force on the same day. It was notified in The Gazette of India on 26 September 1969.

== Ratification ==
The Act was passed in accordance with the provisions of Article 368 of the Constitution, and was ratified by more than half of the State Legislatures, as required under Clause (2) of the said article. State Legislatures that ratified the amendment are listed below:

1. Assam
2. Gujarat
3. Haryana
4. Kerala
5. Madhya Pradesh
6. Maharashtra
7. Mysore
8. Nagaland
9. Rajasthan
10. Tamil Nadu
11. Uttar Pradesh
12. West Bengal

Did not ratify:

1. Andhra Pradesh
2. Bihar
3. Jammu and Kashmir
4. Orissa
5. Punjab

== See also ==
- List of amendments of the Constitution of India
