= List of amendments of the Constitution of India =

Types of amendments

As of March 2026, there have been 106 amendments of the Constitution of India since it was first enacted in 1950.

The Indian Constitution is one of the most amended national constitutions in the world. The Constitution spells out governmental powers with so much detail that many matters addressed by statute in other democracies must be addressed via constitutional amendment in India. As a result, the Constitution is amended roughly twice a year.

There are three types of amendments to the Constitution of India of which the second and third types of amendments are governed by Article 368.

- The first type of amendment must be passed by a "simple majority" in each house of the Parliament of India.
- The second type of amendment must be passed by a prescribed "special majority" of each house of Parliament; and
- The third type of amendment must be passed by a "special majority" in each house of Parliament and ratified by at least one half of the State Legislatures. Examples of the third type of amendment include amendments No. 3, 6, 7, 8, 13, 14, 15, 16, 22, 23, 24, 25, 28, 30, 31, 32, 35, 36, 38, 39, 42, 43, 44, 45, 46, 51, 54, 61, 62, 70, 73, 74, 75, 79, 84, 88, 95, 99, 101, and 104.

== List of amendments ==
No.	Introduced in Parliament	Amendments	Enforced since	Objectives	Prime Minister
1st	1951	15, 19, 85, 87, 174, 176, 341, 342, 372 and 376. Insert articles 31A and 31B. Insert schedule 9.	18 June 1951	Added special provision for the advancement of any socially and educationally backward classes or for the Scheduled Castes and Scheduled Tribes (SCs and STs). To fully secure the constitutional validity of zamindari abolition laws and to place reasonable restrictions on freedom of speech. A new constitutional device, called Schedule 9, introduced to protect against laws that are contrary to constitutionally guaranteed fundamental rights. These laws encroach upon property rights, freedom of speech and equality before law.	Jawaharlal Nehru
2nd	1952	Amend article 81(1)(b).	1 May 1953	Removed the upper limit of 750,000 people, allowing for a single member to represent a larger population in a parliamentary constituency by amending Article 81(1)(b).	Jawaharlal Nehru
3rd	1954	Amend schedule 7.	22 February 1955	Re-enacted entry 33 of the Concurrent List in the Seventh Schedule with relation to include trade and commerce in, and the production, supply and distribution of four classes of essential commodities, viz., foodstuffs, including edible oil seeds and oils; cattle fodder, including oilcakes and other concentrates; raw cotton whether ginned or unginned, and cotton seeds; and raw jute.	Jawaharlal Nehru
4th	1955	Amend articles 31, 31A, and 305. Amend schedule 9.	27 April 1955	Primarily dealt with property rights and the state's power of acquisition. The amendment also included provisions to fix limits on the amount of agricultural land that an individual could own or occupy. Aimed to give the state full control over mineral and oil resources.	Jawaharlal Nehru
5th	1955	Amend article 3.	24 December 1955	Empowered the President to prescribe a time limit for a State Legislature to convey its views on proposed Central laws relating to the formation of new States and alteration of areas, boundaries or names of existing States. Also permitted the President to extend the prescribed limit.	Jawaharlal Nehru
6th	1956	Amend articles 269 and 286. Amend schedule 7.	11 September 1956	Amend the Union List and State List with respect to raising of taxes.	Jawaharlal Nehru
7th	1956	Amend articles 1, 3, 49, 80, 81, 82, 131, 153, 158, 168, 170, 171, 216, 217, 220, 222, 224, 230, 231 and 232. Insert articles 258A, 290A, 298, 350A, 350B, 371, 372A and 378A. Amend part 8. Amend schedules 1, 2, 4 and 7.	1 November 1956	Reorganisation of states on linguistic lines, abolition of Class A, B, C, D states and introduction of Union territories.	Jawaharlal Nehru
8th	1960	Amend article 334.	5 January 1960	Extended the period of reservation of seats for the Scheduled Castes and Scheduled Tribes and Anglo-Indians in the Lok Sabha and the State Legislative Assemblies till 1970.	Jawaharlal Nehru
9th	1960	Amend schedule 1.	28 December 1960	Minor adjustments to territory of Indian Union consequent to agreement with Pakistan for settlement of disputes by demarcation of border villages, etc.	Jawaharlal Nehru
10th	1961	Amend article 240. Amend schedule 1.	11 August 1961	Incorporation of Dadra and Nagar Haveli as a Union Territory, consequent to acquisition from Portugal.	Jawaharlal Nehru
11th		Amend articles 66 and 71.	19 December 1961	Election of Vice President by Electoral College consisting of members of both Houses of Parliament, instead of election by a Joint Sitting of Parliament. Indemnify the President and Vice President Election procedure from challenge on grounds of existence of any vacancies in the electoral college.	Jawaharlal Nehru
12th		Amend article 240. Amend schedule 1.	20 December 1961	Incorporation of Goa, Daman and Diu as a Union Territory, consequent to acquisition from Portugal.	Jawaharlal Nehru
13th		Amend article 170. Insert new article 371A.	1 December 1962	Special protection under Article 371A for newly create State of Nagaland.	Jawaharlal Nehru
14th		Amend articles 81 and 240. Insert article 239A. Amend schedules 1 and 4.	28 December 1962	Incorporation of Pondicherry into the Union of India and creation of Legislative Assemblies for Himachal Pradesh, Tripura, Manipur and Goa.	Jawaharlal Nehru
15th		Amend articles 124, 128, 217, 222, 224, 226, 297, 311 and 316. Insert article 224A. Amend schedule 7.	5 October 1963	Raise retirement age of High Court judges from 60 to 62 and other minor amendments for rationalising interpretation of rules regarding judges etc.	Jawaharlal Nehru
16th		Amend articles 19, 84 and 173. Amend schedule 3.	5 October 1963	Make it obligatory for seekers of public office to swear their allegiance to the Indian Republic and prescribe the various obligatory templates.	Jawaharlal Nehru
17th		Amend article 31A. Amend schedule 9.	20 June 1964	To secure the constitutional validity of acquisition of Estates and place land acquisition laws in Schedule 9 of the constitution.	Jawaharlal Nehru
18th		Amend article 3.	27 August 1966	Technical Amendment to include Union Territories in Article 3 and hence permit reorganisation of Union Territories.	Lal Bahadur Shastri
19th		Amend article 324.	11 December 1966	Abolish Election Tribunals and enable trial of election petitions by regular High Courts.	Lal Bahadur Shastri
20th		Insert article 233A.	22 December 1966	Indemnify & validate judgments, decrees, orders and sentences passed by judges and to validate the appointment, posting, promotion and transfer of judges barring a few who were not eligible for appointment under article 233. Amendment needed to overcome the effect of judgment invalidating appointments of certain judges in the state of Uttar Pradesh.	Lal Bahadur Shastri
21st		Amend schedule 8.	10 April 1967	Include Sindhi as an official language.	Indira Gandhi
22nd		Amend article 275. Insert articles 244A and 371B.	25 September 1969	Provision to form Autonomous states within the State of Assam.	Indira Gandhi
23rd		Amend articles 330, 332, 333 and 334.	23 January 1970	Discontinued reservation of seats for the Scheduled Tribes in Nagaland, both in the Lok Sabha and the State Legislative Assembly and stipulated that not more than one Anglo-Indian could be nominated by the Governor to any State Legislative Assembly. Extend reservation for SCs and STs and Anglo-Indian members in the Lok Sabha and State Assemblies for another ten years, i.e. up to 1980.	Indira Gandhi
24th		Amend articles 13 and 368.	5 November 1971	Article 13(4) added. Enable Parliament to dilute Fundamental Rights through amendments to the Constitution. It was made compulsory for the President to give consent to the Constitution Amendment Bill.	Indira Gandhi
25th		Amend article 31. Insert article 31C.	8 December 1971	Restrict property rights and compensation in case the state takes over private property. However, the Supreme Court quashed a part of Article 31C (4) to the extent it took away the power of judicial review. This was done in the landmark case of Kesavananda Bharati v. State of Kerala (1973) 4 SCC 225 which for the first time enunciated the Basic structure doctrine.	Indira Gandhi
26th		Amend article 366. Insert article 363A. Remove articles 291 and 362.	28 December 1971	Abolition of privy purse paid to former rulers of princely states which were incorporated into the Indian Republic.	Indira Gandhi
27th		Amend articles 239A and 240. Insert articles 239B and 371C.	(i) 30 December 1971 & (ii) 15 February 1972	Reorganisation of Mizoram into a Union Territory with a legislature and council of ministers.	Indira Gandhi
28th		Insert article 312A. Remove article 314.	29 August 1972	Rationalise Civil Service rules to make it uniform across those appointed prior to Independence and post Independence.	Indira Gandhi
29th		Amend schedule 9.	9 June 1972	'Kerala land reform acts' and amendments to these act placed under Schedule 9 of the constitution.	Indira Gandhi
30th		Amend article 133.	9 June 1972	Change the basis for appeals in Supreme Court of India in case of Civil Suits from value criteria to one involving substantial question of law.	Indira Gandhi
31st		Amend articles 81, 330 and 332.	17 October 1973	Increase size of Parliament from 525 to 545 seats. Increased seats going to the new states formed in North East India and minor adjustment consequent to 1971 Delimitation exercise.	Indira Gandhi
32nd		Amend article 371. Insert articles 371D and 371E. Amend schedule 7.	1 July 1974	Protection of regional rights in Telangana and Andhra regions of State of Andhra Pradesh. Supreme Court in P. Sambamurthy v. State of Andhra Pradesh 1987 SCC (1) 362 held clause (3) and (5) along with its Proviso of Article 371D as unconstitutional and void. It was found to be violative of basic structure doctrine, against the concept of justice and the principle of the rule of law.	Indira Gandhi
33rd		Amend articles 101 and 190.	19 May 1974	Prescribes procedure for resignation by members of parliament and state legislatures and the procedure for verification and acceptance of resignation by house speaker.	Indira Gandhi
34th		Amend schedule 9.	7 September 1974	Place land reform acts and amendments to these act under Schedule 9 of the constitution.	Indira Gandhi
35th		Amend articles 80 and 81. Insert article 2A. Insert schedule 10.	1 March 1975	Terms and Conditions for the Incorporation of Sikkim into the Union of India.	Indira Gandhi
36th		Amend articles 80 and 81. Insert article 371F. Remove article 2A. Amend schedules 1 and 4. Remove schedule 10.	26 April 1975	Formation of Sikkim as a State within the Indian Union.	Indira Gandhi
37th		Amend articles 239A and 240.	3 May 1975	Formation of Arunachal Pradesh legislative assembly.	Indira Gandhi
38th		Amend articles 123, 213, 239B, 352, 356, 359 and 360.	1 August 1975	Enhances the powers of President and Governors to pass ordinances.	Indira Gandhi
39th		Amend articles 71 and 329. Insert article 329A. Amend schedule 9.	10 August 1975	Amendment designed to negate the judgement of Allahabad HC in State of Uttar Pradesh v. Raj Narain 1975 SCR (3) 333 invalidating PM Indira Gandhi's election to parliament. Amendment placed restrictions on judicial scrutiny of post of Prime Minister. Irrespective of electoral malpractice, no case can be filed against president, vice president, speaker of lok sabha and prime minister. Later, clauses (4) and (5) of Article 329A were struck down by the Supreme Court in Indira Nehru Gandhi v. Raj Narain 1976 (2) SCR 347, for being in violation of basic structure.	Indira Gandhi
40th		Amend article 297. Amend schedule 9.	27 May 1976	Enable Parliament to make laws with respect to Exclusive Economic Zone and vest the mineral wealth with Union of India. Place land reform & other acts and amendments to these act under Schedule 9 of the constitution.	Indira Gandhi
41st		Amend article 316.	7 September 1976	Raise Retirement Age Limit of Chairmen and Members of Joint Public Service Commissions and State Public Service Commissions from sixty to sixty two. No case can be filed against prime minister, governor, president, even after they demit office (which was later struck down by supreme court)	Indira Gandhi
42nd		Amend articles 31, 31C, 39, 55, 74, 77, 81, 82, 83, 100, 102, 103, 105, 118, 145, 150, 166, 170, 172, 189, 191, 192, 194, 208, 217, 225, 226, 227, 228, 311, 312, 330, 352, 353, 356, 357, 358, 359, 366, 368 and 371F. Insert articles 31D, 32A, 39A, 43A, 48A, 131A, 139A, 144A, 226A, 228A and 257A. Insert parts IVA and XIVA. Amend schedule 7.	3 January, 1 February & 1 April 1977	Amendment passed during internal emergency by Indira Gandhi. Provides for curtailment of fundamental rights, imposes fundamental duties and changes to the basic structure of the constitution by making India a "Sovereign Socialist Secular Democratic Republic". However, the Supreme Court, in Minerva Mills v. Union of India 1980 SCC (3) 625, quashed the amendments to Articles 31C and 368 as it was in contravention with the basic structure of the Constitution.	Indira Gandhi
43rd		Amend articles 145, 226, 228 and 366. Remove articles 31D, 32A, 131A, 144A, 226A and 228A.	13 April 1978	Amendment passed after revocation of internal emergency in the Country. Repeals some of the more 'Anti-Freedom' amendments enacted through Amendment Bill 42.	Morarji Desai
44th		Amend articles 19, 22, 30, 31A, 31C, 38, 71, 74, 77, 83, 103, 105, 123, 132, 133, 134, 139A, 150, 166, 172, 192, 194, 213, 217, 225, 226, 227, 239B, 329, 352, 356, 358, 359, 360 and 371F. Insert articles 134A and 361A. Remove articles 31, 257A and 329A. Amend part 12. Amend schedule 9.	20 June, 1 August & 6 September 1979	Amendment passed after revocation of internal emergency in the Country. Article 19(1)(f) right to property was omitted. Provides for human rights safeguards and mechanisms to prevent abuse of executive and legislative authority. Annuls some Amendments enacted in Amendment Bill 42.	Morarji Desai
45th		Amend article 334.	25 January 1980	Extend reservation for SCs and STs and nomination of Anglo Indian members in Parliament and State Assemblies for another ten years i.e. up to 1990.	Indira Gandhi
46th		Amend articles 269, 286 and 366. Amend schedule 7.	2 February 1983	Amendment to negate judicial pronouncements on scope and applicability on Sales Tax.	Indira Gandhi
47th		Amend schedule 9.	26 August 1984	Place land reform acts and amendments to these act under Schedule 9 of the constitution.	Indira Gandhi
48th		Amend article 356.	1 April 1984	Article 356 amended to permit President's rule up to two years in the state of Punjab.	Indira Gandhi
49th		Amend article 244. Amend schedules 5 and 6.	11 September 1984	Recognise Tripura as a tribal state and enable the creation of a Tripura Tribal Areas Autonomous District Council.	Indira Gandhi
50th		Amend article 33.	11 September 1984	Technical Amendment to curtailment of Fundamental Rights as per Part III as prescribed in Article 33 to cover Security Personnel protecting property and communication infrastructure.	Indira Gandhi
51st		Amend articles 330 and 332.	16 June 1984	Provide reservation to Scheduled Tribes in Nagaland, Meghalaya, Mizoram and Arunachal Pradesh in Loksabha, similarly for Meghalaya and Arunachal in their Legislative Assemblies.	Indira Gandhi
52nd		Amend articles 101, 102, 190 and 191. Insert schedule 10.	1 March 1985	Anti Defection Law – Provide disqualification of members from parliament and assembly in case of defection from one party to other. However, para 7 of the 10th Schedule was struck down by the Supreme Court in the case of Kihoto Hollohan v. Zachillhu 1992 SCR (1) 686, for being in contravention with Article 368 of the Constitution.	Rajiv Gandhi
53rd		Insert article 371G.	20 February 1986	Special provision with respect to the State of Mizoram.	Rajiv Gandhi
54th		Amend articles 125 and 221. Amend schedule 2.	1 April 1986	Increase the salary of Chief Justice of India & other Judges and to provide for determining future increases without the need for constitutional amendment.	Rajiv Gandhi
55th		Insert article 371H.	20 February 1987	Special powers to Governor consequent to formation of state of Arunachal Pradesh.	Rajiv Gandhi
56th		Insert article 371I.	30 May 1987	Transition provision to enable formation of state of Goa.	Rajiv Gandhi
57th		Amend article 332.	21 September 1987	Provide reservation to Scheduled Tribes in Nagaland, Meghalaya, Mizoram and Arunachal Pradesh Legislative Assemblies.	Rajiv Gandhi
58th		Insert article 394A. Amend part 22.	9 December 1987	Provision to publish authentic Hindi translation of constitution as on date and provision to publish authentic Hindi translation of future amendments.	Rajiv Gandhi
59th		Amend article 356. Insert article 359A.	30 March 1988	Article 356 amended to permit President's rule up to three years in the state of Punjab, Articles 352 and Article 359A amended to permit imposing emergency in state of Punjab or in specific districts of the state of Punjab.	Rajiv Gandhi
60th		Amend article 276.	20 December 1988	Profession Tax increased from a maximum of Rs. 250/- to a maximum of Rs. 2500/-.	Rajiv Gandhi
61st		Amend article 326.	28 March 1989	Reduce age for voting rights from 21 to 18.	Rajiv Gandhi
62nd		Amend article 334.	25 January 1990	Extend reservation for SCs and STs and nomination of Anglo Indian members in Parliament and State Assemblies for another ten years i.e. up to 2000.	V. P. Singh
63rd		Amend article 356. Remove article 359A.	6 January 1990	Emergency powers applicable to State of Punjab, accorded in Article 359A as per amendment 59 repealed.	V. P. Singh
64th		Amend article 356.	16 April 1990	Article 356 amended to permit President's rule up to three years and six months in the state of Punjab.	V. P. Singh
65th		Amend article 338.	12 March 1992	National Commission for Scheduled Castes and Scheduled Tribes formed and its statutory powers specified in The Constitution.	V. P. Singh
66th		Amend schedule 9.	7 June 1990	Place land reform acts and amendments to these act under Schedule 9 of the constitution.	V. P. Singh
67th		Amend article 356.	4 October 1990	Article 356 amended to permit President's rule up to four years in the state of Punjab.	V. P. Singh
68th		Amend article 356.	12 March 1991	Article 356 amended to permit President's rule up to five years in the state of Punjab.	Chandra Shekhar
69th		Insert articles 239AA and 239AB.	1 February 1992	To provide for a legislative assembly and council of ministers for National Capital Territory of Delhi. Delhi continues to be a Union Territory.	P. V. Narasimha Rao
70th		Amend articles 54 and 239AA.	21 December 1991	Include National Capital Territory of Delhi and Union Territory of Pondicherry in Electoral College for presidential election.	P. V. Narasimha Rao
71st		Amend schedule 8.	31 August 1992	Include Konkani, Manipuri and Nepali as official languages.	P. V. Narasimha Rao
72nd		Amend article 332.	5 December 1992	Provide reservation to Scheduled Tribes in Tripura State Legislative Assembly.	P. V. Narasimha Rao
73rd		Insert part 9. Insert schedule 11.	24 April 1993	Statutory provisions for Panchayati Raj as third level of administration in villages.	P. V. Narasimha Rao
74th		Insert part 9A, insert schedule 12, amend article 280.	1 June 1993	Statutory provisions for Local Administrative bodies as third level of administration in urban areas such as towns and cities.	P. V. Narasimha Rao
75th		Amend article 323B.	15 May 1994	Provisions for setting up Rent Control Tribunals.	P. V. Narasimha Rao
76th		Amend schedule 9.	31 August 1994	Enable continuance of 69% reservation in Tamil Nadu by including the relevant Tamil Nadu Act under 9th Schedule of the constitution.	P. V. Narasimha Rao
77th		Amend article 16.	17 June 1995	A technical amendment to protect reservation to SCs and STs Employees in promotions.	P. V. Narasimha Rao
78th		Amend schedule 9.	30 August 1995	Place land reform acts and amendments to these act under Schedule 9 of the constitution.	P. V. Narasimha Rao
79th		Amend article 334.	25 January 2000	Extend reservation for SCs and STs and nomination of Anglo Indian members in Parliament and State Assemblies for another ten years i.e. up to 2010.	Atal Bihari Vajpayee
80th		Amend articles 269 and 270. Remove article 272.	9 June 2000	Implement Tenth Finance Commission recommendation to simplify the tax structures by pooling and sharing all taxes between states and the centre.	Atal Bihari Vajpayee
81st		Amend article 16.	9 June 2000	Protect SCs and STs reservation in filling backlog of vacancies.	Atal Bihari Vajpayee
82nd		Amend article 335.	8 September 2000	Permit relaxation of qualifying marks and other criteria in reservation in promotion for SCs and STs candidates.	Atal Bihari Vajpayee
83rd		Amend article 243M.	8 September 2000	Exempt Arunachal Pradesh from reservation for Scheduled Castes in Panchayati Raj institutions.	Atal Bihari Vajpayee
84th		Amend articles 55, 81, 82, 170, 330 and 332.	21 February 2002	Extend the usage of 1971 national census population figures for statewise distribution of parliamentary seats.	Atal Bihari Vajpayee
85th		Amend article 16.	4 January 2002	A technical amendment to protect Consequential seniority in case of promotions of SCs and STs Employees.	Atal Bihari Vajpayee
86th		Amend articles 45 and 51A. Insert article 21A.	12 December 2002	Provides Right to Education until the age of fourteen.	Atal Bihari Vajpayee
87th		Amend articles 81, 82, 170 and 330.	22 June 2003	Extend the usage of 2001 national census population figures for statewise distribution of parliamentary seats.	Atal Bihari Vajpayee
88th		Amend article 270. Insert article 268A. Amend schedule 7.	15 January 2004	To extend statutory cover for levy and utilisation of Service Tax.	Atal Bihari Vajpayee
89th		Amend article 338. Insert article 338A.	28 September 2003	The National Commission for Scheduled Castes and Scheduled Tribes was bifurcated into The National Commission for Scheduled Castes and The National Commission for Scheduled Tribes.	Atal Bihari Vajpayee
90th		Amend article 332.	28 September 2003	Reservation in Assam Assembly relating to Bodoland Territory Area.	Atal Bihari Vajpayee
91st		Amend articles 75 and 164. Insert article 361B. Amend schedule 10.	1 January 2004	Restrict the size of council of ministers to 15% of legislative members & to strengthen Anti Defection laws.	Atal Bihari Vajpayee
92nd		Amend schedule 8.	7 January 2004	Include Bodo, Dogri, Santali and Maithili as official languages.	Atal Bihari Vajpayee
93rd		Amend article 15.	20 January 2006	To enable provision of reservation (27%) for Other Backward Class(OBCs) in government as well as private educational institutions.	Manmohan Singh
94th		Amend article 164.	12 June 2006	To provide for a Minister of Tribal Welfare in newly created Jharkhand and Chhattisgarh States including Madhya Pradesh and Odisha.	Manmohan Singh
95th		Amend article 334.	25 January 2010	To extend reservation for SCs and STs and nomination of Anglo Indian members in Parliament and State Assemblies for another ten years i.e. up to 2020.	Manmohan Singh
96th		Amend schedule 8.	23 September 2011	Substituted "Odia" in the place of "Oriya".	Manmohan Singh
97th		Amend Art 19 and add Art 43B and Part IXB.	12 January 2012	Added the words "or co-operative societies" after the word "or unions" in Article 19(l)(c) and insertion of article 43B i.e., Promotion of Co-operative Societies and added Part-IXB i.e., The Co-operative Societies. In July 2021 Supreme Court Struck Part of the amendment as it was not ratified by the states. The amendment objective is to encourage economic activities of cooperatives which in turn help progress of rural India. It is expected to not only ensure autonomous and democratic functioning of cooperatives, but also the accountability of the management to the members and other stakeholders.	Manmohan Singh
98th		To insert Article 371J in the Constitution	1 January 2013	To empower the Governor of Karnataka to take steps to develop the Hyderabad-Karnataka Region.	Manmohan Singh
99th		Insertion of new articles 124A, 124B and 124C. Amendments to Articles 127, 128, 217, 222, 224A, 231.	13 April 2015 Struck down on 16 October 2015	Formation of a National Judicial Appointments Commission. 16 State assemblies out of 29 States including Goa, Rajasthan, Tripura, Gujarat and Telangana ratified the Central Legislation, enabling the President of India to give assent to the bill. The amendment was struck down by the Supreme Court on 16 October 2015.	Narendra Modi
100th		Amendment of First Schedule to Constitution	31 July 2015	Exchange of certain enclave territories with Bangladesh and conferment of citizenship rights to residents of enclaves consequent to signing of Land Boundary Agreement (LBA) Treaty between India and Bangladesh.	Narendra Modi
101st		Add of articles 246A, 269A, 279A. Deletion of Article 268A. Amend articles 248, 249, 250, 268, 269, 270, 271, 286, 366, 368, Sixth Schedule, Seventh Schedule.	1 July 2017	Introduced the Goods and Services Tax.	Narendra Modi
102nd		Add articles 338B, 342A, and add Clause 26C. Modification of articles 338, 366.	11 August 2018	Constitutional status to National Commission for Backward Classes	Narendra Modi
103rd		Amend Article 15, add Clause [6], Amend to Article 16, add Clause [6].	12 January 2019	A maximum of 10% Reservation for Economically Weaker Sections (EWSs) of citizens of classes other than the classes mentioned in clauses (4) and (5) of Article 15, i.e. Classes other than socially and educationally backward classes of citizens or the Scheduled Castes and the Scheduled Tribes. Inserted Clause [6] under Article 15 as well as Inserted Clause [6] under Article 16.	Narendra Modi
104th		Amend article 334.	25 January 2020	To extend the reservation of seats for SCs and STs in the Lok Sabha and states assemblies for another 10 years i.e. up to 2030. Removed the reserved seats for the Anglo-Indian community in the Lok Sabha and state assemblies by not extending it further.	Narendra Modi
105th		Amend Article 338B, 342A and 366.	10 August 2021	To restore the power of the state governments to identify Other Backward Classes (OBCs) that are socially and educationally backward. This amendment annulled the Supreme Court judgement of 11 May 2021, which had empowered only the Central government for such identification.	Narendra Modi
106th		Amend article 239AA. Insert of articles 330A, 332A, 334A.	28 September 2023	To reserve one-third of the seats in the Lok Sabha (330A), state legislative assemblies (332A) and Delhi Legislative Assembly (239AA) for women for a period of 15 years after coming to effect (334A).	Narendra Modi

== See also ==
- Constitution of India
- Lawmaking procedure in India
- List of acts of the Parliament of India
