= Second Amendment of the Constitution of India =

The Constitution (Second Amendment) Act, 1952

Parliament of India
- Long title: An Act further to amend the Constitution of India.
- Citation: 2nd Amendment
- Territorial extent: India
- Passed by: Lok Sabha
- Passed: 15 December 1952
- Passed by: Rajya Sabha
- Passed: 19 December 1952
- Assented to: 1 May 1953
- Signed by: Rajendra Prasad
- Commenced: 1 May 1953

Legislative history

Initiating chamber: Lok Sabha
- Bill title: The Constitution (Second Amendment) Bill, 1952
- Introduced by: C.C. Biswas
- Introduced: 18 June 1952
- Committee report: Report of the Select Committee of the House of the People on The Constitution (Second Amendment) Bill, 1952

Final stages
- Reported from conference committee: 18 November 1952
- Conference committee bill passed by Lok Sabha: 15 December 1952
- Status: In force

The Second Amendment of the Constitution of India, officially known as The Constitution (Second Amendment) Act, 1952, removed the upper population limit for a parliamentary constituency by amending Article 81(1)(b) of the Constitution. Article 81(1)(b) had stipulated that the number of members to be allotted to each parliamentary constituency should be determined so as to ensure that there would be not less than one member for every 750,000 of the population and not more than one member for every 500,000 of the population.

== Full Text ==
BE it enacted by Parliament as follows:-

1. Short title This Act may be called the Constitution (Second Amendment) Act, 1952.

2. Amendment of article 81 In sub-clause (b) of clause (1) of article 81 of the Constitution, the words and figures "not less than one member for every 750,000 of the population and" shall be omitted.

The full text of sub-clauses (a) and (b) of clause (1) of Article 81, after the 2nd Amendment, is given below:

81. (1)(a) Subject to the provisions of clause (2) and of articles 82 and 331, the House of the People shall consist of not more than five hundred members directly elected by the voters in the States.

(b) For the purpose of sub-clause (a), the States shall be divided, grouped or formed into territorial constituencies and the number of members to be allotted to each such constituency shall be so determined as to ensure that there shall be ~~not less than one member for every 750,000 of the population and~~ not more than one member for every 500,000 of the population.

== Proposal and enactment ==
The bill of The Constitution (Second Amendment) Act, 1952 was introduced in the Lok Sabha on 18 June 1952, as the Constitution (Second Amendment) Bill, 1952 (Bill No. 54 of 1952). It was introduced by C.C. Biswas, then Minister of Law and Minority Affairs. The bill sought to amend Article 81 of the Constitution. The full text of the Statement of Objects and Reasons appended to the bill is given below:

Article 81(1)(a) prescribes an absolute limit of 500 elected members in the House of the People. Article 81(1)(b) provides that the States shall be divided, grouped or formed into territorial constituencies and the number of members to be allotted to each such constituency shall be so determined as to ensure that there shall be not less than one member for every 750,000 of the population and not more than one member for every 500,000 of the population.

The present delimitation of Parliamentary and Assembly constituencies is based on the estimates of population which have been given legal validity by an order of the President under article 387 of the Constitution. Article 81(3) of the Constitution, however, requires that upon the completion of each census, the representation of the several territorial constituencies in the House of the People and the Legislative Assemblies of each State shall be re-adjusted by such authority, in such manner and with effect from such date as Parliament may by law determine. A Bill providing for the matters referred to in that article is being introduced in Parliament. Provision has been made in that Bill for the setting up of a Delimitation Commission for the purpose of effecting re-adjustment of the representation in the House of the People and in the State Legislative Assemblies on the basis of the population as ascertained at the census of 1951.

There is a considerable difference between the population of the several States as estimated in the President's order and in the population as ascertained at the census of 1951. At present, seats have been allotted in the House of the People to Part A and Part B States on the basis of one member for every 7.2 lakhs of the estimated population giving a total of 470 members to these States. The census figures are higher in all cases, and in view of the overall limit of 500 members prescribed in article 81(1) (a), it is not possible to increase appreciably the total number of seats allotted to these States. It is accordingly necessary to reduce the representation from one member for every 7.2 lakhs of population to one member for every 7.5 lakhs of population as per 1951 census. As pointed out above, this figure 7.5 lakhs is the maximum permissible under article 81(1)(b) as it now stands; but even so, if the average population of a Parliamentary constituency in any State is to be 750,000 it is obvious that the population of a certain number of constituencies will exceed that figure. It is necessary, therefore, that article 81(1)(b) should be amended relaxing the limits prescribed in that article so as to avoid a constitutional irregularity in delimiting the constituencies for the purpose of re-adjustment of representation in the House of the People as required under article 81(3) of the Constitution. This Bill accordingly seeks to amend article 81(1)(b) of the Constitution so as to replace the figures mentioned in that article by the figures 850,000 and 650,000 respectively.

— C.C. Biswas, "The Constitution (Second Amendment) Bill, 1952". This article incorporates text from this source, which is in the public domain.

The bill was debated by the Lok Sabha on 18 June, 8 and 9 July, and 11 and 18 November 1952. A motion to refer the bill to a Select Committee of the House was moved and adopted on 11 November 1952. The Select Committee presented its Report to the House on 18 November. The bill, as recommended by the committee, was then considered by the Lok Sabha on 9, 10 and 15 December. The House passed the bill on 15 December 1952. The bill was put to vote in the Lok Sabha on 15 December 1952. The House divided: Ayes, 351; Noes, 23. The motion was carried by a majority of the total membership of the House and by a majority of not less than two-thirds of the members present and voting, as required under Article 368 of the Constitution. The bill was then debated by the Rajya Sabha on 15 and 18 December, and passed on 19 December 1952.The House divided: Ayes, 123; Noes, 13. The motion was carried by the requisite special majority, and the bill was passed by the Rajya Sabha.

The bill received assent from then President Rajendra Prasad on 1 May 1953, and came into force on the same date. It was notified in The Gazette of India on 2 May 1953.

== See also ==
- List of amendments of the Constitution of India
