= Nineteenth Amendment of the Constitution of India =

Abolished and replaced election tribunals

The Constitution (Nineteenth Amendment) Act, 1966

Parliament of India
- Long title: An Act further to amend the Constitution of India.
- Citation: 19th Amendment
- Territorial extent: India
- Passed by: Lok Sabha
- Passed: 22 November 1966
- Passed by: Rajya Sabha
- Passed: 30 November 1966
- Assented to: 11 December 1966
- Commenced: 11 December 1966

Legislative history

Initiating chamber: Lok Sabha
- Bill title: Constitution (Twenty-first Amendment) Bill, 1966
- Introduced by: Gopal Swarup Pathak
- Introduced: 29 August 1966

Related legislation
- Representation of the People Act, 1951

Summary
- Abolished Election Tribunals and enabled trial of election petitions by High Courts
- Status: In force

The Nineteenth Amendment of the Constitution of India, officially known as The Constitution (Nineteenth Amendment) Act, 1966, abolished Election Tribunals in India and enabled trial of election petitions by High Courts. It amended clause (1) of article 324 of the Constitution, which provides for vesting of the power of superintendence, direction and control of elections with the Election Commission. The 19th Amendment removed the provision relating to the power of "the appointment of election tribunals for the decision of doubts and disputes arising out of or in connection with elections to Parliament and to the Legislatures of States".

Provisions for the trial of election petitions by High Courts instead of the election tribunals, was provided for by amending the Representation of the People Act, 1951.

== Text ==
BE it enacted by Parliament in the Seventeenth Year of the Republic of India as follows:—

1. Short title This Act may be called the Constitution (Nineteenth Amendment) Act, 1966.

2. Amendment of article 324 In article 324 of the Constitution, in clause (1), the words "including the appointment of election tribunals for the decision of doubts and disputes arising out of or in connection with elections to Parliament and to the Legislatures of States" shall be omitted.

The full text of clause (1) of article 324, after the 19th Amendment, is given below:

324. Superintendence, direction and control of elections to be vested in an Election Commission. (1) The superintendence, direction and control of the preparation of the electoral rolls for, and the conduct of, all elections to Parliament and to the Legislature of every State and of elections to the offices of President and Vice-President held under this Constitution, ~~including the appointment of election tribunals for the decision of doubts and disputes arising out of or in connection with elections to Parliament and to the Legislatures of States~~ shall be vested in a Commission (referred to in this Constitution as the Election Commission).

== Proposal and enactment ==
The Constitution (Nineteenth Amendment) Act, 1966 was introduced in the Lok Sabha on 29 August 1966, as the Constitution (Twenty-first Amendment) Bill, 1966 (Bill No. 57 of 1966). It was introduced by Gopal Swarup Pathak, then Minister of Law, and sought to amend article 324 of the Constitution. Article 324 provides for vesting of the power of superintendence, direction and control of elections with the Election Commission. The full text of the Statement of Objects and Reasons appended to the bill is given below:

One of the important recommendations made by the Election Commission in its Report on the Third General Elections in India in 1962, and accepted by the Government relates to the abolition of election tribunals and trial of election petitions by High Courts.

If the proposal for a legislation to amend the Representation of the People Act, 1951, containing, inter alia, provisions for the trial of election petitions by High Courts instead of the election tribunals, as at present, is accepted by Parliament, it would be necessary to make a minor amendment in clause (1) of article 324 of the Constitution for the purpose of deleting therefrom the words, "including the appointment of election tribunals for the decision of doubts and disputes arising out of or in connection with elections to Parliament and to the Legislatures of States".

The Bill is intended to give effect to the aforesaid object.

— G.S. Pathak, "The Constitution (Twenty-first Amendment) Bill, 1966".

The Bill was debated by the Lok Sabha on 8, 9, 10 and 22 November and passed on 22 November 1966, with only a formal amendment in clause 1, changing the short title to "Constitution (Nineteenth Amendment) Act". The bill, passed by the Lok Sabha, was considered and passed by the Rajya Sabha on 30 November 1966. Clause 2 was adopted in the original form by the Lok Sabha and Rajya Sabha on 22 and 30 November 1966, respectively. The bill received assent from then President Zakir Husain on 11 December 1966. It came into force and was notified in The Gazette of India on the same date.

== See also ==
- List of amendments of the Constitution of India
