= Eighteenth Amendment of the Constitution of India =

Clarified the meaning of "State" in the Indian Constitution

The Constitution (Eighteenth Amendment) Act, 1966

Parliament of India
- Long title: An Act further to amend the Constitution of India.
- Citation: 18th Amendment
- Territorial extent: India
- Passed by: Lok Sabha
- Passed: 10 August 1966
- Passed by: Rajya Sabha
- Passed: 24 August 1966
- Assented to: 27 August 1966
- Commenced: 27 August 1966

Legislative history

First chamber: Lok Sabha
- Bill title: Constitution (Twentieth Amendment) Bill, 1966
- Introduced by: C. R. Pattabhi Raman
- Introduced: 25 July 1966
- Status: In force

The Eighteenth Amendment of the Constitution of India, officially known as The Constitution (Eighteenth Amendment) Act, 1966, amended article 3 of the Constitution in order to clarify the "State" in clauses (a) to (e) of that article (but not in the proviso) include "Union territories". It also added another "Explanation" that the power conferred on Parliament by clause (a) includes the power to form a new State or Union territory by uniting a part of any State or Union territory to any other State or Union territory.

== Text ==
BE it enacted by Parliament in the Seventeenth Year of the Republic of India as follows:

1. Short title This Act may be called the Constitution (Eighteenth Amendment) Act, 1966.

2. Amendment of article 3 In article 3 of the Constitution, the following Explanations shall be inserted at the end, namely:—

"Explanation I – In this article in clauses (a) to (e), "State" includes a Union territory, but in the proviso, "State" does not include a Union territory.
Explanation II – The power conferred on Parliament by clause (a) includes the power to form a new State or Union territory by uniting a part of any State or Union territory to any other State or Union territory".

The full text of article 3 of the Constitution, prior to the 18th Amendment, is given below:

3. Formation of new States and alteration of areas, boundaries or names of existing States.

Parliament may by law—

(a) form a new State by separation of territory from any State or by uniting two or more States or parts of States or by uniting any territory to a part of any State;
(b) increase the area of any State;
(c) diminish the area of any State;
(d) alter the boundaries of any State;
(e) alter the name of any State:

Provided that no Bill for the purpose shall be introduced in either House of Parliament except on the recommendation of the President and unless, where the proposal contained in the Bill affects the area, boundaries or name of any of the States specified in Part A or Part B of the First Schedule, the Bill has been referred by the President to the Legislature of that State for expressing its views thereon within such period as may be specified in the reference or within such further period as the President may allow and the period so specified or allowed has expired.

== Proposal and enactment ==
The first attempt to amend article 3, in order to clarify the "State" in clauses (a) to (e) of that article (but not in the proviso) include "Union territories", and also to make it clear that power under clause (a) includes the power to form a new State or Union territory by uniting a part of a State or Union territory to another State or Union territory, was through the Constitution (Nineteenth Amendment) Bill, 1966. The bill was introduced in the Lok Sabha on 9 May 1966 by Jaisukh Lal Hathi, then Minister of State in the Ministry of Home Affairs. However, the motion to consider the Bill failed to get the requisite majority on 16 May 1966 and was not carried in the Lok Sabha. The amendments proposed in the Bill were later incorporated in the Constitution (Twentieth Amendment) Bill, 1966. Both bills contained exactly the same text.

The Constitution (Twentieth Amendment) Bill, 1966 (Bill No. 39 of 1966) was introduced in the Lok Sabha on 25 July 1966. It was introduced by C. R. Pattabhi Raman, then Minister of State in the Ministry of Law, and sought to amend article 3 just like the Constitution (Nineteenth Amendment) Bill, 1966. The full text of the Statement of Objects and Reasons appended to the bill is given below:

Article 3 of the Constitution provides for the formation of new States and alteration of areas, boundaries, or names of existing States. Before the Constitution (Seventh Amendment) Act, 1956, was enacted, the expression "States" occurring in that article meant Part A States, Part B States and also Part C States. By the Seventh Amendment of the Constitution in 1956, the concept of "Union territories" was introduced in our Constitution but article 3 was not amended to include in terms "Union territories". It is considered proper to amend this article to make it clear that "State" in clauses (a) to (e) of that article (but not in the proviso) includes "Union territories". It is also considered proper to make it clear that power under clause (a) of article 3 includes power to form a new State or Union territory by uniting a part of a State or Union territory to another State or Union territory.

The Bill seeks to achieve the above objects.

— Gulzarilal Nanda, "The Constitution (Twentieth Amendment) Bill, 1966". This article incorporates text from this source, which is in the public domain.

The bill was debated and passed by the Lok Sabha on 10 August 1966, with only a formal amendment to clause 1, changing the short title to the "Constitution (Eighteenth Amendment) Act". The bill passed by the Lok Sabha, was considered and passed by the Rajya Sabha on 24 August 1966. The bill received assent from then President Zakir Husain on 27 August 1966, and came into force on the same date. It was notified in The Gazette of India on 29 August 1966.

== See also ==
- List of amendments of the Constitution of India
