= Forty-seventh Amendment of the Constitution of India =

The Constitution (Forty-seventh Amendment) Act, 1984

Parliament of India
- Long title: An Act further to amend the Constitution of India.
- Citation: 47th Amendment
- Territorial extent: India
- Passed by: Lok Sabha
- Passed: 23 August 1984
- Passed by: Rajya Sabha
- Passed: 25 August 1984
- Assented to: 26 August 1984
- Commenced: 26 August 1984

Legislative history

Initiating chamber: Lok Sabha
- Bill title: The Constitution (Forty-eighth Amendment) Bill, 1983
- Introduced by: Harinatha Misra
- Introduced: 19 August 1983
- First reading: 19 August 1983
- Second reading: 22 August 1984
- Third reading: 23 August 1984

Related legislation
- 29th, 34th, 40th, 66th and 78th Amendments

Summary
- Added to the Ninth Schedule to the Constitution, 14 additional legislations relating to land reforms, enacted by the States of Assam, Bihar, Haryana, Tamil Nadu, Uttar Pradesh and West Bengal and the Union territory of Goa, Daman and Diu with a view to provide that the enactments shall not be deemed to be void on the ground that they are inconsistent with any of the provisions of Part III of the Constitution relating to Fundamental Rights.
- Status: In force

The Forty-seventh Amendment of the Constitution of India, officially known as The Constitution (Forty-seventh Amendment) Act, 1984, amended the Ninth Schedule to the Constitution, and added 14 legislations relating to land reforms, enacted by the States of Assam, Bihar, Haryana, Tamil Nadu, Uttar Pradesh and West Bengal and the union territory of Goa, Daman and Diu with a view to provide that the enactments shall not be deemed to be void on the ground that they are inconsistent with any of the provisions of Part III of the Constitution relating to Fundamental Rights.

== Text ==
During India's 35th year of the Republic, Parliament enacted the following.

1. Short title (1) This is the 47th (Forty-seventh Amendment in our constitution) Act, 1984.

2. Amendment of the Ninth Schedule In the Ninth Schedule to the Constitution, after entry 188 and before the Explanation, the following entries shall be inserted, namely:—

"189. The Assam (Temporarily Settled Areas) Tenancy Act, (Assam Act XXIII of 1971).
190. The Assam (Temporarily Settled Areas) Tenancy (Amendment) Act, 1974 (Assam Act XVIII of 1974).
191. The Bihar Land Reforms (Fixation of Ceiling Area and Acquisition of Surplus Land, Amendment) (Amending) Act, 1974 (Bihar Act 13 of 1975).
192. The Bihar Land Reforms (Fixation of Ceiling Area and Acquisition of Surplus Land, Amendment) Act, 1976 (Bihar Act 22 of 1976).
193. The Bihar Land Reforms (Fixation of Ceiling Area and Acquisition of Surplus Land, Amendment) Act, 1978 (Bihar Act VII of 1978).
194. The Land Acquisition (Bihar Amendment) Act, 1979 (Bihar Act 2 of 1980).
195. The Haryana Ceiling on Land Holdings (Amendment) Act, 1977 (Haryana Act 14 of 1977).
196. The Tamil Nadu Land Reforms (Fixation of Ceiling on Land) Amendment Act, 1978 (Tamil Nadu Act 25 of 1978).
197. The Tamil Nadu Land Reforms (Fixation of Ceiling on Land) Amendment Act, 1979 (Tamil Nadu Act 11 of 1979).
198. The Uttar Pradesh Zamindari Abolition Laws (Amendment) Act, 1978 (Uttar Pradesh Act 15 of 1978).
199. The West Bengal Restoration of Alienated Land (Amendment) Act, 1978 (West Bengal Act XXIV of 1978).
200. The West Bengal Restoration of Alienated Land (Amendment) Act, 1980 (West Bengal Act LVI of 1980).
201. The Goa, Daman and Diu Agricultural Tenancy Act, 1964 (Goa, Daman and Diu Act 7 of 1964).
202. The Goa, Daman and Diu Agricultural Tenancy 5th (Fifth Amendment) Act, 1976 (Goa, Daman and Diu Act 17 of 1976)."

== Proposal and enactment ==
The Constitution (Forty-seventh Amendment) Act, 1984 was introduced in the Lok Sabha on 19 August 1983 as the Constitution (Forty-eighth Amendment) Bill, 1983 (Bill No. 94 of 1983). It was introduced by Harinatha Misra, then Minister of State in the Ministry of Rural Development. The Bill sought to add to the Ninth Schedule to the Constitution, 14 additional legislations relating to land reforms, enacted by the States of Assam, Bihar, Haryana, Tamil Nadu, Uttar Pradesh and West Bengal and the Union territory of Goa, Daman and Diu with a view to provide that the enactments shall not be deemed to be void on the ground that they are inconsistent with any of the provisions of Part III of the Constitution relating to Fundamental Rights. The full text of the Statement of Objects and Reasons appended to the bill is given below:

Article 31B of the Constitution confers on the enactments included in the Ninth Schedule to the Constitution immunity from any possible attack that they are violative of any of the fundamental rights. The immunity does not extend to any amendment made to such Acts after their inclusion in the Ninth Schedule.

2. Recourse was had in the past to the Ninth Schedule whenever it was found that progressive legislation conceived in the interest of the public was imperilled by litigation. Several State enactments relating to land reforms and ceiling on agricultural land holdings have already been included in the Ninth Schedule. The Sixth Five Year Plan (1980-85) contains an assurance that "necessary action would be taken to bring before Parliament land reform Acts not yet included in the Ninth Schedule to the Constitution for immediate inclusion in the said Schedule" and that the same "would be done in the case of future Acts without delay so that these laws are protected from challenge in courts". The State Governments of Assam, Bihar, Haryana, Tamil Nadu, Uttar Pradesh and West Bengal and the Administration of the Union territory of Goa, Daman and Diu have suggested the inclusion of some of their Acts relating to land reforms in the Ninth Schedule. Some of the Acts suggested for inclusion are by way of amendments to Acts already included in the Ninth Schedule. The various Acts which have been suggested for inclusion have been examined and it is proposed to include in the Ninth Schedule such of these Acts as have either been challenged or are likely to be challenged and thereby ensure that the implementation of these Acts is not adversely affected by litigation.

3. The Bill seeks to achieve the above object.

— Harinatha Misra, "The Constitution (Forty-eighth Amendment) Bill, 1983". This article incorporates text from this source, which is in the public domain.

The Bill was considered by the Lok Sabha on 22 and 23 August and passed on 23 August 1984, with formal amendments changing the short title to the Constitution (Forty-seventh Amendment) Act, 1984 and replacing the word "Thirty-fourth" by the word "Thirty-fifth" in the Enacting Formula. The Bill, as passed by the Lok Sabha, was considered and passed by the Rajya Sabha on 25 August 1984. The bill received assent from then President Giani Zail Singh on 26 August 1984. It was notified in The Gazette of India, and came into effect on the same date.

== See also ==
- List of amendments of the Constitution of India
