= Forty-eighth Amendment of the Constitution of India =

The Constitution (Forty-eighth Amendment) Act, 1984

Parliament of India
- Long title: An Act further to amend the Constitution of India.
- Citation: 48th Amendment
- Territorial extent: India
- Passed by: Lok Sabha
- Passed: 23 August 1983
- Passed by: Rajya Sabha
- Passed: 25 August 1984
- Assented to: 26 August 1984
- Commenced: 26 August 1984

Legislative history

Initiating chamber: Lok Sabha
- Bill title: The Constitution (Fiftieth Amendment) Bill, 1984
- Introduced by: P.V. Narasimha Rao
- Introduced: 17 August 1984

Related legislation
- 59th, 63rd, 64th, 67th and 68th Amendments

Summary
- Provided that in the case of the Proclamation issued by the President on 6 October 1983 with respect to the State of Punjab, Parliament may pass any resolution with respect to the continuance in force of the Proclamation for a period up to two years.
- Status: Spent

The Forty-eighth Amendment of the Constitution of India, officially known as The Constitution (Forty-eighth Amendment) Act, 1984, inserted a new proviso in clause (5) of article 356 of the Constitution in order to provide that in the case of the Proclamation issued by the President on 6 October 1983 with respect to the State of Punjab, Parliament may pass any resolution with respect to the continuance in force of the Proclamation for a period up to two years.

== Text ==
BE it enacted by Parliament in the Thirty-fifth Year of the Republic of India as follows:---

1. Short title (1) This Act may be called the Constitution (Forty-eighth Amendment) Act, 1984.

2. Amendment of article 356 In article 356 of the Constitution, in clause (5), the following proviso shall be inserted at the end namely:— "Provided that in the case of the Proclamation issued under clause (1) on the 6th day of October, 1983 with respect to the State of Punjab, the reference in this clause to "any period beyond the expiration of one year" shall be construed as a reference to "any period beyond the expiration of two years.

== Proposal and enactment ==
The Constitution (Forty-eighth Amendment) Act, 1984 was introduced in the Lok Sabha on 17 August 1984 as the Constitution (Fiftieth Amendment) Bill, 1984 (Bill No. 77 of 1984). It was introduced by P.V. Narasimha Rao, then Minister of Home Affairs. The Bill sought to amend article 356 of the Constitution, and insert a new proviso in clause (5) of article 356 of the Constitution in order to provide that in the case of the Proclamation issued by the President on 6 October 1983 with respect to the State of Punjab, Parliament may pass any resolution with respect to the continuance in force of the Proclamation for a period up to two years. The full text of the Statement of Objects and Reasons appended to the bill is given below:

The Proclamation issued by the President under article 356 of the Constitution on the 6th day of October, 1983 with respect to the State of Punjab cannot be continued in force for more than one year unless the special conditions mentioned in clause (5) of article 356 of the Constitution are satisfied. Although the Legislative Assembly is in suspended animation and a popular government can be installed, having regard to the prevailing situation in the State, the continuance of the Proclamation beyond 5th October, 1984 may be necessary. To facilitate the adoption of a resolution by the two Houses of Parliament approving the continuance in force of the Proclamation beyond 5th October, 1984, it is necessary to amend article 356 of the Constitution. It is therefore proposed to amend clause (5) of article 356 so as to make the conditions mentioned therein inapplicable for the purposes of the continuance in force of the said Proclamation up to a period of two years from the date of its issue

— P. V. Narasimha Rao, "The Constitution (Fiftieth Amendment) Bill, 1984".

The Bill was considered by the Lok Sabha on 23 August 1984, and passed on the same day with a formal amendment changing the short title to "The Constitution (Forty-eighth Amendment) Act, 1984". The Bill, as passed by the Lok Sabha, was considered and passed by the Rajya Sabha on 25 August 1984. The bill received assent from then President Giani Zail Singh on 26 August 1984. It was notified in The Gazette of India, and came into effect on the same date.

== See also ==
- List of amendments of the Constitution of India
