= Sixty-first Amendment of the Constitution of India =

Lowered the voting age for legislative elections

The Constitution (Sixty-first Amendment) Act, 1989

Parliament of India
- Long title: An Act further to amend the Constitution of India.
- Citation: 61st Amendment
- Territorial extent: India
- Passed by: Lok Sabha
- Passed: 15 December 1988
- Passed by: Rajya Sabha
- Passed: 20 December 1988
- Assented to: 28 March 1989
- Commenced: 28 March 1989

Legislative history

Initiating chamber: Lok Sabha
- Bill title: The Constitution (Sixty-second Amendment) Bill, 1988
- Introduced by: B. Shankaranand
- Introduced: 13 December 1988

Summary
- Lowered the voting age from 21 years to 18 years
- Status: In force

The Sixty-first Amendment of the Constitution of India, officially known as The Constitution (Sixty-first Amendment) Act, 1988, lowered the voting age of elections to the Lok Sabha and to the Legislative Assemblies of States from 21 years to 18 years. This was done by amending Article 326 of the Constitution, which concerns elections to the Lok Sabha and the Assemblies.

== Text ==
BE it enacted by Parliament in the Thirty-ninth Year of the Republic of India as follows:-

1. Short title This Act may be called the Constitution (Sixty-first Amendment) Act, 1988.

2. Amendment of article 326 In article 326 of the Constitution, for the words "twenty-one years", the words "eighteen years" shall be substituted.

The full text of Article 326 of the Constitution, after the 61st Amendment, is given below:

326. The elections to the House of the People and to the Legislative Assembly of every State shall be on the basis of adult suffrage; that is to say, every person who is a citizen of India and who is not less than ~~twenty-one years~~ eighteen years of age on such date as may be fixed in that behalf by or under any law made by the appropriate Legislature and is not otherwise disqualified under this Constitution or any law made by the appropriate Legislature on the ground of non-residence, unsoundness of mind, crime or corrupt or illegal practice, shall be entitled to be registered as a voter at any such election.

== Proposal and enactment ==
The bill of The Constitution (Sixty-first Amendment) Act, 1988 was introduced in the Lok Sabha on 13 December 1988, as the Constitution (Sixty-second Amendment) Bill, 1988 (Bill No. 129 of 1988). It was introduced by B. Shankaranand, then Minister of Water Resources. The bill sought to amend Article 326 of the Constitution, relating to elections to the Lok Sabha and to the Legislative Assemblies of States based on adult suffrage. The full text of the Statement of Objects and Reasons appended to the bill is given below:

Article 326 of the Constitution provides that the elections to the House of the People and to the Legislative Assembly of every State shall be on the basis of adult suffrage, that is to say, a person should not be less than 35 years of age. It has been found that many of the countries have specified 18 years as the voting age. In our country some of the State Governments have adopted 18 years of age for elections to the local authorities. The present-day youth are literate and enlightened and the lowering of the voting age would provide to the unrepresented youth of the country an opportunity to give vent to their feelings and help them become a part of the political process. The present-day youth are very much politically conscious. It is, therefore, proposed to reduce the voting age from 21 years to 18 years.

2. The Bill seeks to achieve the above object.

— B. Shankaranand, "The Constitution (Sixty-second Amendment) Bill, 1988".

The bill was debated by the Lok Sabha on 14 and 15 December 1988, and was passed on 15 December, after adopting a formal amendment to replace the word "Sixty-second" with "Sixty-first" in Clause 1 of the bill. The Rajya Sabha debated the bill on 16, 19 and 20 December 1988 and passed it on 20 December 1988, after adopting the amendment made by the Lok Sabha. The bill, after ratification by the States, received assent from then President Ramaswamy Venkataraman on 28 March 1989. It was notified in The Gazette of India, and came into force on the same date.

== Ratification ==
The Act was passed in accordance with the provisions of Article 368 of the Constitution, and was ratified by more than half of the State Legislatures, as required under Clause (2) of the said article. State Legislatures that ratified the amendment are listed below:

1. Maharashtra
2. Kerala
3. Haryana
4. Orissa
5. Sikkim
6. Andhra Pradesh
7. Meghalaya
8. Madhya Pradesh
9. Manipur
10. Uttar Pradesh
11. West Bengal
12. Karnataka
13. Rajasthan
14. Himachal Pradesh
15. Arunachal Pradesh
16. Bihar
17. Gujarat
18. Mizoram
19. Goa
20. Assam

Did not ratify:

1. Jammu and Kashmir
2. Nagaland
3. Punjab
4. Tamil Nadu
5. Tripura

== See also ==
- List of amendments of the Constitution of India
- Twenty-sixth Amendment to the United States Constitution
