= Sixth Amendment =

Sixth Amendment may refer to:

- Sixth Amendment to the United States Constitution, part of the Bill of Rights, which sets out rights of the accused in a criminal prosecution
- Sixth Amendment of the Constitution of India, 1956 amendment which empowered the central (federal) government to tax inter-state commerce
- Sixth Amendment of the Constitution of Ireland, ensured that certain adoption orders would not be found to be unconstitutional because they had not been made by a court
- Sixth Amendment of the Constitution of South Africa, which altered the structure of the judiciary and made a number of other technical changes
- Sixth Amendment to the Constitution of Pakistan, which altered the term and age limits on the judiciary
