= Professional Tax =

Indian direct tax collected by some state governments

Profession tax is the tax levied and collected by the state governments in India. It is a direct tax. A person earning an income from salary or anyone practicing a profession such as chartered accountant, company secretary, cost accountant, Software Engineer, lawyer, doctor etc. are required to pay this professional tax. Different states have different rates and methods of collection. In India, profession tax is imposed every month. However, not all states impose this tax. The states which impose professional tax are Karnataka, Bihar, West Bengal, Andhra Pradesh, Telangana, Maharashtra, Tamil Nadu, Gujarat, Assam, Kerala, Meghalaya, Odisha, Tripura, Madhya Pradesh, Jharkhand, Sikkim and Mizoram. Business owners, working individuals, merchants and people carrying out various occupations come under the purview of this tax.

Profession tax is levied and collected by the Commercial Taxes Department of State Governments, in some states by particular Municipal Corporations and majority of the Indian states are collecting this tax. It is a source of revenue for the government. The maximum amount payable per year is INR 2,500 and in line with tax payer's salary, there are predetermined slabs. It is also payable by members of staff employed in private companies. It is deducted by the employer from their employee every month and remitted to state exchequer and in some states sent to the Municipal Corporation. It is mandatory to pay professional tax. The tax payer is eligible for income tax deduction for this payment.

Applicability of Profession Tax as per the Constitution of India: Article 276 of the Constitution of India provides that "there shall be levied and collected a tax on professions, trades, callings and employments, in accordance with the provisions of this Act. Every person engaged in any profession, trade, calling or employment and falling under one or the other of the classes mentioned in the second column of the Schedule shall be liable to pay to the State Government tax at the rate mentioned against the class of such persons in the third column of the said Schedule. Provided that entry 23 in the Schedule shall apply only to such classes of persons as may be specified by the State Government by notification from time to time."

== Article 276 in Constitution of India, 1949 ==
- Notwithstanding until provisions to the contrary is made by Parliament by law, and any law so made by Parliament may be made either generally or in relation to any specified States, municipalities, boards or authorities
- The power of the Legislature of a State to make laws as aforesaid with respect to taxes on professions, trades, callings and employments shall not be construed as limiting in any way the power of Parliament to make laws with respect to taxes on income accruing from or arising out of professions, trades, callings and employments

== Amount ==
The professional tax is collected from various professionals as listed in schedule of the Act. it is collected from salaried employees as well as from professionals. It is deducted from salary of the employee every month. In case of a company, directors of a company, partnerships, individual partners, self-employed professional or owners of any business undertaken in the state, the liability of the tax depending upon their gross turnover in the preceding year. In some cases, the payment of tax is fixed and is to be paid irrespective of turnover. For example in state of West Bengal, owner of a factory has to pay professional tax only if the preceding year turnover is greater than 5 lac rupees and in case of companies there is a mandatory payment of rupees 2,500 /- each year as professional tax irrespective of turnover.

Different states have different rates of professional tax based on the profession of an individual and / or their income.

Responsibility of Deduction The owner of a business is responsible to deduct professional tax from the salaries of his employees and pay the amount so collected to the appropriate government department. He/she has to furnish a return to the tax department in the prescribed form within the specified time limit.

== Registration ==
Employers have to apply for the Registration Certificate of their respective State Tax Department within 30 days of employing the staff. In case the place of work spans multiple states or place, application for the Registration Certificate has to be done separately to each authority with respect to the place of work coming under the jurisdiction of that authority.

== Deposit of Amount Deducted ==
Professional tax is collected by the Commercial Tax Department. The commercial tax department of the respective states collects it which ultimately reaches the fund of municipality corporation.

- Employers covered under the jurisdiction of “State Government” as Designated authority shall pay in the treasury by Challan through the bank. Other employers shall pay at the place of payment declared by the Designated Authorities concerned.
- If an employer has employed more than 20 employees, he is required to make payment within 15 days from the end of the month. However, if an employer has less than 20 employees, he is required to pay quarterly(i.e. by the 15th of next month from the end of the quarter).

Person responsible to pay professional tax

In case of employees, an employer is the responsible to deduct and pay professional tax to the State Government subject to monetary threshold if any provided by respective State’s legislation. Additionally, employer (corporates, partnership firms, sole proprietorship etc.) also being a person carrying on trade/profession is also required to pay professional tax on his trade/profession again subject to monetary threshold if any provided by respective State’s legislation. In such case, employer needs to register and obtain both professional tax registration certificate to be able to pay professional tax on his trade/profession and professional tax enrolment certificate to be able to deduct the tax from his employees and pay. Further, separate registration may be required for each office depending on respective State’s legislation.

Persons who are carrying on freelancing business without any employees also required to register themselves subject to monetary threshold if any provided by respective State’s legislation.

However, professional tax levy is subject to exemption provided by respective State to certain categories. For example: Parents or guardian of any person who is suffering from intellectual disability, blind persons are exempted among others from levy of Karnataka Professional tax.

== Penalties for Non-Compliance ==
Delays in obtaining Registration Certificate, a penalty of Rs. 5/- per day. In case of non/late payment of profession tax, penalty will be 10% of the amount of tax. In case of late filing of returns, a penalty of Rs. 1000 per return will be imposed if you filed after due date in 1 month. After 1 month, a penalty of Rs. 2000 will be imposed.
