= Third Amendment of the Constitution of India =

The Constitution (Third Amendment) Act, 1954

Parliament of India
- Long title: An Act further to amend the Constitution of India.
- Citation: 3rd Amendment
- Territorial extent: India
- Passed by: Lok Sabha
- Passed: 23 September 1954
- Passed by: Rajya Sabha
- Passed: 28 September 1954
- Assented to: 22 February 1955
- Signed by: Rajendra Prasad
- Commenced: 22 February 1955

Legislative history

Initiating chamber: Lok Sabha
- Bill title: The Constitution (Third Amendment) Bill, 1954
- Introduced by: T. T. Krishnamachari
- Introduced: 6 September 1954
- Committee report: Report of the Joint Committee of the Constitution (Third Amendment) Bill, 1954

Final stages
- Reported from conference committee: 20 September 1954
- Status: In force

The Third Amendment of the Constitution of India, officially known as The Constitution (Third Amendment) Act, 1954, re-enacted entry 33 of the Concurrent List in the Seventh Schedule of the Constitution with relation to include trade and commerce in, and the production, supply and distribution of 4 classes of essential commodities, foodstuffs, including edible oil seeds and oils; cattle fodder, including oilcakes and other concentrates; raw cotton whether ginned or unginned, and cotton seeds; and raw jute.

== Text ==
It was enacted by Parliament in the Fifth Year of the Republic of India as follows:-

1. Short title This Act may be called the Constitution (Third Amendment) Act 1954.

2. Amendment of the Seventh Schedule In the Seventh Schedule to the Constitution, for entry 33 of List III, the following entry shall be substituted, namely:-

"33. Trade and commerce in, and the production, supply and distribution of,-

(a) the products of any industry where the control of such industry by the Union is declared by Parliament by law to be expedient in the public interest, and imported goods of the same kind as such products;
(b) foodstuffs, including edible oil seeds and oils;
(c) cattle fodder, including oilcakes and other concentrates;
(d) raw cotton whether ginned or unginned, and cotton seeds; and
(e) raw jute."

The full text of entry 33 of the Concurrent List, prior to the 3rd Amendment is given below:

33. Trade and commerce in, and the production, supply and distribution of, the products of industries where the control of such industries by the Union is declared by Parliament by law to be expedient in the public interest.

== Proposal and enactment ==
The bill of The Constitution (Third Amendment) Act, 1954 was introduced in the Lok Sabha on 6 September 1954, as the Constitution (Third Amendment) Bill, 1954 (Bill No. 40 of 1954). It was introduced by T. T. Krishnamachari, then Minister of Commerce and Industry. The bill sought to the Seventh Schedule of the Constitution, substituting a new entry for the original entry 33 of List III (Concurrent List). The full text of the Statement of Objects and Reasons appended to the bill is given below:

Entry 33 of the Concurrent List enabled Parliament to legislate in respect of industries declared to be under Union control. In addition, Parliament was empowered by article 369, for a period of five years, to legislate in respect of certain specified essential commodities. It was not considered advisable that after article 369 lapsed to control the production, supply and distribution of some of these essential commodities. The bill seeks to amplify Entry 33 of the Concurrent List accordingly.

— T.T. Krishnamachari

A motion to refer the bill to a Joint Committee was moved by the Lok Sabha on 10 September and adopted on 13 September. The motion was concurred by the Rajya Sabha on 16 September 1954. The Joint Committee presented its Report to the Lok Sabha on 20 September. The Rajya Sabha passed the bill on 28 September 1954. The bill, after ratification by the States, received assent from then President Rajendra Prasad on 22 February 1955. It was notified in The Gazette of India, and also came into force on the same date.

== Ratification ==
The Bill was passed in accordance with the provisions of Article 368 of the Constitution, and was ratified by the Legislatures of more than one-half of the States specified in Parts A and B of the First Schedule by resolutions to that effect passed by those Legislatures before the Bill making provision for such amendment is presented to the President for assent, as required by the said article. State Legislatures that ratified the amendment are listed below:

1. Rajasthan
2. Punjab
3. Patiala and East Punjab States Union
4. Saurashtra
5. Madhya Pradesh
6. Madras
7. Bihar
8. West Bengal

== See also ==
- List of amendments of the Constitution of India
