= Ninety-fourth Amendment of the Constitution of India =

Amendment in the Constitution of India

Constitution (Ninety-fourth Amendment) Act, 2006

Parliament of India
- Long title: An Act further to amend the Constitution of India.
- Territorial extent: India
- Passed by: Lok Sabha
- Passed: 22 May 2006
- Passed by: Rajya Sabha
- Passed: 22 May 2006
- Assented to by: President A. P. J. Abdul Kalam
- Assented to: 12 June 2006
- Commenced: 12 June 2006

Legislative history

Initiating chamber: Lok Sabha
- Bill title: Constitution (One Hundred and Fifth Amendment) Bill, 2006
- Bill citation: Bill No. 15 of 2006
- Introduced by: Shivraj Patil
- Introduced: 1 March 2006
- Passed: 22 May 2006

Revising chamber: Rajya Sabha
- Passed: 22 May 2006
- Status: In force

The Ninety-fourth Amendment of the Constitution of India, officially known as The Constitution (Ninety-fourth Amendment) Act, 2006, made provisions for the appointment of a Minister in charge of tribal welfare in the states of Chhattisgarh and Jharkhand.

The bill of The Constitution (Ninety-fourth Amendment) Act, 2006 was introduced in the Lok Sabha on 1 March 2006 as the Constitution (One Hundred and Fifth Amendment) Bill, 2006. It was introduced by Shivraj Patil, then Minister of Home Affairs.

The bill was considered by the Lok Sabha on 17 May 2006 and passed on 22 May 2006. It was then passed by the Rajya Sabha on 22 May 2006. The bill received assent from then President A. P. J. Abdul Kalam on 12 June 2006, and came into force on the same date. It was notified in The Gazette of India on 13 June 2006.

== Ninety Fourth Amendment ==
The new states Chhattisgarh and Jharkhand were formed by the Madhya Pradesh Reorganisation Act, 2000 and the Bihar Reorganisation Act, 2000. As a consequence of the reorganisation of Chhattisgarh and Jharkhand, the whole of the scheduled area of Madhya Pradesh was transferred to Chhattisgarh. Therefore this amendment has substituted the word Bihar in Article 164(1) of the Constitution by the words Chhattisgarh and Jharkhand.
