= Fifth Amendment of the Constitution of India =

Amendment regarding state boundaries

The Constitution (Fifth Amendment) Act, 1955

Parliament of India
- Long title: An Act further to amend the Constitution of India.
- Citation: 5th Amendment
- Territorial extent: India
- Passed by: Lok Sabha
- Passed: 13 December 1955
- Passed by: Rajya Sabha
- Passed: 15 December 1955
- Assented to: 24 December 1955
- Signed by: Rajendra Prasad
- Commenced: 12 December 1956

Legislative history

First chamber: Lok Sabha
- Bill title: The Constitution (Eighth Amendment) Bill, 1955
- Introduced by: H.V. Pataskar
- Introduced: 9 December 1955
- Status: In force

The Fifth Amendment of the Constitution of India, officially known as The Constitution (Fifth Amendment) Act, 1955, empowered the President to prescribe a time limit for a State Legislature to convey its views on proposed Central laws relating to the formation of new States and alteration of areas, boundaries or names of existing States. The amendment also permitted the President to extend the prescribed limit, and prohibited any such bill from being introduced in Parliament until after the expiry of the prescribed or extended period. The 5th Amendment re-enacted the provision to Article 3 of the Constitution.

== Text ==
'' The full text of Article 3 of the Constitution, before the 5th Amendment is given below:

3. Formation of new States and alteration of areas, boundaries or names of existing States.

Parliament may by law—

(a) form a new State by separation of territory from any State or by uniting two or more States or parts of States or by uniting any territory to a part of any State;
(b) increase the area of any State;
(c) diminish the area of any State;
(d) alter the boundaries of any State;
(e) alter the name of any State:

Provided that no Bill for the purpose shall be introduced in either House of Parliament except on the recommendation of the President and unless, where the proposal contained in the Bill affects the boundaries of any State or States specified in Part A or Part B of the First Schedule or the name or names of any such State or States, the views of the Legislature of the State or, as the case may be, of each of the States both with respect to the proposal to introduce the Bill and with respect to the provisions thereof have been ascertained by the President.

The full text of the 5th Amendment is given below:

BE it enacted by Parliament in the Sixth Year of the Republic of India as follows:---

1. Short title This Act may be called the Constitution (Fifth Amendment) Act, 1955.

2. Amendment of article 3 In article 3 of the Constitution, for the provision, the following provision shall be substituted, namely:-

"Provided that no Bill for the purpose shall be introduced in either House of Parliament except on the recommendation of the President and unless, where the proposal contained in the Bill affects the area, boundaries or name of any of the States specified in Part A or Part B of the First Schedule, the Bill has been referred by the President to the Legislature of that State for expressing its views thereon within such period as may be specified in the reference or within such further period as the President may allow and the period so specified or allowed has expired."

== Proposal and enactment ==
Under the provision to Article 3 of the Constitution (relating to formation of new States and alteration of areas, boundaries or names of existing States), no bill for the purpose of forming a new state, increasing or decreasing the area of any state or altering the boundaries or name of any state could be introduced in Parliament, unless the views of the State Legislatures concerned with respect to the provisions of the bill had been ascertained by the President. It was considered desirable that when a reference was made to the State Legislatures for the said purpose, the President should be able to prescribe the period within which the states should convey their views, and it should be open to the President to extend such period whenever he considered it necessary. It was also considered desirable to provide that the bill would not be introduced until after the expiry of such period. The 5th Amendment sought to amend the provision to Article 3 of the Constitution accordingly.

The original Article 3 was so drafted because of three main reasons; (a) When it was drafted, the Princely States had not been fully integrated, (b) There was also the possibility of reorganisation of states on linguistic basis; and (c) Constituent Assembly had foreseen that such reorganisation could not be postponed for long. Therefore, accordingly, Article 3 was incorporated in the Constitution providing for an easy and simple method for reorganisation of the states at any time.

The Constitution (Fifth Amendment) Bill, 1955 (Bill No. 60 of 1955) was introduced in the Lok Sabha on 21 November 1955. It was introduced by C.C. Biswas, then Minister of Law and Minority Affairs, and sought to amend Articles 3, 100, 101, 103, 148, 189, 190, 192, 276, 297, 311, 316 and 319 of the Constitution. However, the bill could not be taken up for consideration by the House and lapsed on the dissolution of the First Lok Sabha. The government decided to introduce a separate bill to expedite consideration and passing of the amendment to article 3, because it felt that the Constitution (Fifth Amendment) Bill would take a very long time to be disposed of, as it sought to amend several articles. In order to achieve this, the Constitution (Seventh Amendment) Bill, 1955 (Bill No. 63 of 1955) which sought to amend article 3, was introduced in the Lok Sabha on 28 November 1955, by C.C. Biswas. Clause 2 of this Bill, which sought to amend article 3, was exactly similar to the corresponding clause of the Constitution (Fifth Amendment) Bill, 1955. A motion to refer the Seventh Amendment Bill to the a Select Committee was moved on 30 November 1955. However, this motion failed to obtain the support of a special majority as required by the Rules of Procedure of the House.

The government then introduced the Constitution (Eighth Amendment) Bill, 1955 (Bill No. 73 of 1955), which sought to amend article 3. The new bill was introduced in the Lok Sabha on 9 December 1955, by H.V. Pataskar, then Minister of Legal Affairs, and sought to amend Article 3 of the Constitution. It was debated by the Lok Sabha on 12 and 13 December and passed in its original form on 13 December 1955. After being passed by the House, the Speaker substituted the bracket and words "(Eighth Amendment)" in clause I of the Bill by the brackets and words "(Fifth Amendment)", through a formal amendment. This Bill, as so changed, was considered and passed by the Rajya Sabha on 15 December 1955.

The Bill received assent from then President Rajendra Prasad on 24 December 1955, and was notified in The Gazette of India on 26 December 1955. The 5th Amendment came into force from 12 December 1956.

== See also ==
- List of amendments of the Constitution of India
