= Sixtieth Amendment of the Constitution of India =

Profession Tax increased

The Constitution (Sixtieth Amendment) Act, 1991

Parliament of India
- Long title: An Act further to amend the Constitution of India.
- Citation: 60th Amendment
- Territorial extent: India
- Passed by: Lok Sabha
- Passed: 30 November 1988
- Passed by: Rajya Sabha
- Passed: 6 December 1988
- Assented to: 20 December 1988
- Signed by: Ramaswamy Venkataraman
- Commenced: 20 December 1988

Legislative history

Initiating chamber: Lok Sabha
- Bill title: The Constitution (Sixtieth Amendment) Bill, 1988
- Introduced by: Ajit Kumar Panja
- Introduced: 22 August 1988
- Status: In force

The Sixtieth Amendment of the Constitution of India, officially known as The Constitution (Sixtieth Amendment) Act, 1988, amended article 276 of the Constitution relating to taxes on professions, trades, callings and employments. Section 2 of the Act amended Clause (2) of article 276 of the Constitution to increase the ceiling of tax on professions, trades, callings and employments from ₹250 (equivalent to ₹2,900 or US$30 in 2023) per person per annum to ₹2500 per person per annum. The 60th Amendment also omitted the proviso to clause (2) of article 276.

== Text ==
BE it enacted by Parliament in the Thirty-ninth Year of the Republic of India as follows:---

1. Short title (1) This Act may be called the Constitution (Sixtieth Amendment) Act, 1988.

2. Amendment of article 276 In article 276 of the Constitution, in clause (2)-

(a) for the words "two hundred and fifty rupees", the words "two thousand and five hundred rupees" shall be substituted;
(b) the proviso shall be omitted.

The full text of clause(2) of Article 276 of the Constitution, after the 60th Amendment, is given below:

276. Taxes on professions, trades, callings and employments

(2) The total amount payable in respect of any one person to the State or to any one municipality, district board, local board or other local authority in the State by way of taxes on professions, trades, callings and employments shall not exceed ~~two hundred and fifty rupees~~ two thousand and five hundred rupees per annum:
~~Provided that if in the financial year immediately preceding the commencement of this Constitution there was in force in the case of any State or any such municipality, board or authority a tax on professions, trades, callings or employments the rate, or the maximum rate, of which exceed two hundred and fifty rupees per annum, such tax may continue to be levied until provision to the contrary is made by Parliament by law, and any law so made by Parliament may be made either generally or in relation to any specified States, municipalities, boards or authorities.~~

== Proposal and enactment ==
The Constitution (Sixtieth Amendment) Bill, 1988 (Bill No. 100 of 1988) was introduced in the Lok Sabha on 22 August 1988. It was introduced by Ajit Kumar Panja, then Minister of State in the Department of Revenue in the Ministry of Finance. The Bill sought to amend sought to amend article 276 of the Constitution relating to taxes on professions, trades, callings and employments. Section 2 of the bill amended Clause (2) of article 276 of the Constitution has to increase the ceiling of tax on professions, trades, callings and employments from ₹250 per person per annum to ₹2500 per person per annum. It also sought to omit the proviso to clause (2) of article 276. The full text of the Statement of Objects and Reasons appended to the bill is given below:

Clause (2) of article 276 of the Constitution specifies that the total amount payable in respect of any one person to the State or to any one municipality, district board, local board or other local authority in a State by way of taxes on professions, trades, callings and employments leviable by a State Legislature under clause (1) of that article shall not exceed two hundred and fifty rupees per annum. The proviso to that clause, however, enables the continuance of the levy of such tax at a rate exceeding two hundred and fifty rupees per annum in any State, municipality, etc., if in the financial year immediately preceding the commencement of Constitution there was in force in that State, municipality, etc., any such tax exceeding that rate.

2. Some of the State Governments have represented that this celling of two hundred and fifty rupees which was fixed in 1949, needs to be revised upwards taking into consideration the price rise and other factors. It is also pointed out that the profession tax has, at present, become almost regressive because of the ceiling since even people with high salaries have to pay this tax at only the maximum amount of two hundred and fifty rupees per annum. The upward revision of profession tax will also help the State Governments in raising additional resources.

3. It is accordingly proposed to amend clause (2) of article 276 of the Constitution to increase the ceiling of profession tax from two hundred and fifty rupees per annum to two thousand and five hundred rupees per annum. As the proviso to this clause is no longer relevant, it is proposed to omit it.

4. The Bill seeks to achieve the above objects.

— B.K. Gadhvi, "The Constitution (Sixtieth Amendment) Bill, 1988".

The Bill was considered by the Lok Sabha on 30 November 1988 and passed on the same day in the original form. The Bill, as passed by the Lok Sabha, was debated by the Rajya Sabha on 5 and 6 December and passed by that House on 6 December 1988. The bill received assent from then President Ramaswamy Venkataraman on 20 December 1988. It was notified in The Gazette of India, and came into effect on the same date.

== See also ==
- List of amendments of the Constitution of India
