= Sixth Amendment of the Constitution of India =

Taxed inter-state commerce

The Constitution (Sixth Amendment) Act, 1956

Parliament of India
- Long title: An Act further to amend the Constitution of India.
- Citation: 6th Amendment
- Territorial extent: India
- Passed by: Lok Sabha
- Passed: 1 May 1956
- Passed by: Rajya Sabha
- Passed: 31 May 1956
- Assented to: 11 September 1956
- Signed by: Rajendra Prasad
- Commenced: 11 September 1956

Legislative history

Initiating chamber: Lok Sabha
- Bill title: Constitution (Tenth Amendment) Bill, 1956
- Introduced by: M.C. Shah
- Introduced: 3 May 1956
- Committee report: Report of the Joint Committee of the Houses of Parliament

Final stages
- Reported from conference committee: 23 May 1956
- Status: In force

The Sixth Amendment of the Constitution of India, officially known as The Constitution (Sixth Amendment) Act, 1956, brought taxes on inter-State sales and purchases of goods other than newspapers within the exclusive legislative and executive power of the Union, and levied taxes on inter-State sales and purchase of goods other than newspapers. Although these taxes would be levied and collected in accordance with an Act of Parliament, they would not form part of the Consolidated Fund of India, but would accrue to the States themselves in accordance with such principles of distribution as may be formulated by Parliament by law.

The 6th Amendment also expressly empowers Parliament to formulate by the principles for determining when a sale or purchase of goods takes place in the course of inter-State trade or commerce. Parliament was also empowered to formulate principles for determining when a sale or purchase of goods takes place outside a State, or in the course of the import of the goods into, or export of the goods out of, the territory of India. Further, it gave Parliament the power to declare by law the goods which are of special importance to inter-State trade or commerce and also to specify the restrictions and conditions to which any State law (whether made before or after the Parliamentary law) would be subject in regard to the system of levy, rates and other incidents of the tax on the sale or purchase of those goods.

== Text ==
BE it enacted by Parliament in the Seventh Year of the Republic of India as follows:---

1. Short title (1) This Act may be called the Constitution (Sixth Amendment) Act, 1956.

2. Amendment of the Seventh Schedule In the Seventh Schedule of the Constitution—

(a) in the Union List, after entry 92, the following entry shall be inserted, namely:—

"92A. Taxes on the sale or purchase of goods other than newspapers, where such sale or purchase takes place in the course of inter-State trade or commerce"; and

(b) in the State List, for entry 54, the following entry shall be substituted, namely:—

"54. Taxes on the sale or purchase of goods other than newspapers, subject to the provisions of entry 92A of List 1."

3. Amendment of article 269 In article 269 of the Constitution—

(a) in clause (1) after sub-clause (f), the following sub-clause shall be inserted, namely:—

"(g) taxes on the sale or purchase of goods other than newspapers, where such sale or purchase takes place in the course of inter-State trade or commerce"; and

(b) after clause (2), the following clause shall be inserted, namely:—

"(3) Parliament may by law formulate principles for determining when a sale or purchase of goods takes place in the course of inter-State trade or commerce."

4. Amendment of article 286 In article 286 of the Constitution,—

(a) in clause (1), the Explanation shall be omitted; and
(b) for clauses (2) and (3), the following clauses shall be substituted, namely:—

"(2) Parliament may by law formulate principles for determining when a sale or purchase of goods takes place in any of the ways mentioned in clause (1).
(3) Any law of a State shall in so far as it imposes, or authorises the imposition of, a tax on the sale or purchase of goods declared by Parliament by law to be of special importance in inter-State trade or commerce, be subject to such restrictions and conditions in regard to the system of levy, rates and other incidents of the tax as Parliament may by law specify."

== Constitutional changes ==
Section 2 of the 6th Amendment inserted a new entry 92A in the Union List. It also re-enacted entry 54 on the State List which previously read, "Taxes on the sale or purchase of goods other than newspaper". This brings taxes on inter-State sales and purchases of goods other than newspapers within the exclusive legislative and executive power of the Union and makes Entry 54 of the State List "subject to the provisions" of this new entry.

Section 3(a) of the Act added taxes on inter-State sales and purchase of goods other than newspapers to the list given in clause (1) of article 269 by inserting a new sub-clause (g) in that article. Although these taxes would be levied and collected in accordance with an Act of Parliament, they would not form part of the Consolidated Fund of India, but would accrue to the States themselves in accordance with such principles of distribution as may be formulated by Parliament by law. Section 3(b) inserted a new clause (3) in article 269. The new clause expressly empowers Parliament to formulate by the principles for determining when a sale or purchase of goods takes place in the course of inter-State trade or commerce.

Section 4 omitted the Explanation given in clause (1), and re-enacted clauses (2) and (3). Clause (2) was revised to empower Parliament to formulate principles for determining when a sale or purchase of goods takes place outside a State, or in the course of the import of the goods into, or export of the goods out of, the territory of India. Under the revised clause (3) of article 286, Parliament will have the power to declare by law the goods which are of special importance to inter-State trade or commerce and also to specify the restrictions and conditions to which any State law (whether made before or after the Parliamentary law) would be subject in regard to the system of levy, rates and other incidents of the tax on the sale or purchase of those goods. The full text of Article 286 of the Constitution, prior to being amended by section 4 of the 6th Amendment, is given below:

286. Restrictions as to imposition of tax on the sale or purchase of goods.

(1) No law of a State shall impose, or authorise the imposition of, a tax on the sale or purchase of goods where such sale or purchase takes place—

(a) outside the State; or
(b) in the course of the import of the goods into, or export of the goods out of, the territory of India.
Explanation.— For the purposes of sub-clause (a), a sale or purchase shall be deemed to have taken place in the State in which the goods have actually been delivered as a direct result of such sale or purchase for the purpose of consumption in that State, notwithstanding the fact that under the general law relating to sale of goods the property in the goods has by reason of such sale or purchase passed in another State.

(2) Except in so far as Parliament may by law otherwise provide, no law of a State shall impose, or authorise the imposition of, a tax on the sale or purchase of any goods where such sale or purchase takes place in the course of inter-State trade or commerce

Provided that the President may by order direct that any tax on the sale or purchase of goods which was being lawfully levied by the Government of any State immediately before the commencement of this Constitution shall, notwithstanding that the imposition of such tax is contrary to the provisions of this clause, continue to be levied until the thirty-first day of March, 1951.

(3) No law made by the Legislature of a State imposing, or authorising the imposition of, a tax on the sale or purchase of any such goods as have been declared by Parliament by law to be essential for the life of the community shall have effect unless it has been reserved for the consideration of the President and has received his assent.

== Background ==
While "taxes on the sale or purchase of goods other than newspapers" was an entry in the State List, article 286 of the Constitution subjected the States' power to impose such taxes to four restrictions, of which two are total and two are partial. Under clause (1) of the article, a State is debarred from imposing such a tax when the sale or purchase takes place outside the State or in the course of import of the goods into, or export from, the country. With regard to the first restriction, namely, the non-taxability of sales outside the State, an explanation is given in the clause that "a sale or purchase shall be deemed to have taken place in the State in which goods have actually been delivered as a direct result of such sale or purchase for the purpose of consumption in that State". Then, under clause (2), a State is debarred from imposing the tax on inter-State sales except in so far as Parliament may otherwise provide. Lastly, under clause (3), Parliament is authorised to declare the goods which are essential to the life of the community, and when such a declaration has been made, any law made by a State Legislature imposing a tax on the sale or purchase of those goods has to receive the President's assent in order to be effective.

High judicial authorities found interpretation of the article to be a difficult task and expressed divergent views as to the scope and effect, in particular, of the explanation in clause (1) and of clause (2). The majority view of the Supreme Court in the State of Bombay v. United Motors (India) Ltd., was that sub-clause (a) and the explanation in clause (1) prohibited the taxation of a sale involving inter-State elements by all States except the State in which the goods were delivered for the purpose of consumption therein, and furthermore, that clause (2) did not affect the power of that State to tax the inter-State sale even though Parliament had not made a law removing the ban imposed by that clause. This resulted in dealers resident in one State being subjected to the sales tax jurisdiction and procedure of several other States with which they had dealings in the normal course of their business. Two-and-a-half years later, the second part of this decision was reversed by the Supreme Court in the Bengal Immunity Company Ltd. v. State of Bihar, but here too the Court was not unanimous. In pursuance of clause (3) of the article, Parliament passed an Act in 1952 declaring a number of goods like foodstuff of various kinds, cloth, raw cotton, cattle feeds, iron and steel, coal, etc. to be essential to the life of the community. Since this declaration could not affect pre-existing State laws imposing sales tax on these goods, the result was a wide disparity from State to State, not only in the range of exempted goods, but also in the rates applicable to them.

The Taxation Enquiry Commission examined the problem and made certain recommendations which might be summarised as follows. In essence, sales tax must continue to be a State source of revenue and its levy and administration must substantially pertain to the State Governments. The sphere of power and responsibility of the State might, however, be said to end, and that of the Union to begin, when the sales tax of one State impinges, administratively on the dealers, and fiscally on the consumers, of another State. Broadly, therefore, inter-State sales should be the concern of the Union, but the responsibilities pertaining to the Union could be exercised through the State Governments, and in any case, the revenue should appropriately devolve on them. Intra-State sales, on the other hand, should be left to the States, but with one important exception. Where, for instance, raw material produced in a State is important from the point of view of the consumer or the industry of another State, certain restrictions have to be placed on the taxing power of the State Government, as otherwise it can effect an increase in the cost of the manufactured article, whether such manufacture takes place in the State which produces the raw material, or in another State which imports the material from the State. In either case, to the extent that the finished goods are consumed in a State other than the one which taxes the raw material, the increase in cost on account of the tax is a matter of direct concern to the consumer of another State. Such cases of intra-State sales should appropriately be brought under the full control of the Union. These recommendations of the Commission had been generally accepted by all the State Governments.

== Proposal and enactment ==
The bill of The Constitution (Sixth Amendment) Act, 1956 was introduced in the Lok Sabha on 3 May 1956, as the Constitution (Tenth Amendment) Bill, 1956 (Bill No. 35 of 1956). It was introduced by M.C. Shah, then Minister of Revenue and Civil Expenditure, and sought to amend articles 269, 286 and the Seventh Schedule to the Constitution to remove certain anomalies regarding taxes on inter-State sales and purchases. The object of the Bill was to give effect to the recommendations of the Commission as regards the amendment of the constitutional provisions relating to sales tax. In clause 2, it was proposed to add a new Entry 92A in the Union List placing taxes on inter-State sales and purchases within the exclusive legislative and executive power of the Union, and to make Entry 54 of the State List “subject to the provisions" of this new entry. In clause 3, the Bill proposed to add these taxes to the list given in clause (1) of article 269, so that, although they would be levied and collected in accordance with an Act of Parliament, they would not form part of the Consolidated Fund of India, but would accrue to the States themselves in accordance with such principles of distribution as might be formulated by Parliament by law. A further provision was proposed in article 269 expressly empowering Parliament to formulate by law principles for determining when a sale or purchase of goods takes place in the course of inter-State trade or commerce.

It was proposed in clause 4 to omit from clause (1) of article 286 the Explanation which had given rise to a great deal of legal controversy and practical difficulty. In view of the centralisation of inter-State sales tax proposed in clause 2 of this Bill, clause (2) of article 286 in its present form would cease to be appropriate. In its place, it was proposed to insert a provision empowering Parliament to formulate principles for determining in case of a sale or purchase of goods outside a State, in the course of import of the goods into the territory of India, or in the course of export of the goods out of the territory of India. It was further proposed to replace clause (3) of article 286 by a new clause on the lines recommended by the Taxation Enquiry Commission. Under this revised clause Parliament would have the power to declare by law the goods which were of special importance in inter-State trade or commerce and also to specify the restrictions and conditions to which any State law (whether made before or after the Parliamentary law) would be subject in regard to the system of levy, rates and other incidents of the tax on the sale or purchase of those goods.

The bill was debated by the Lok Sabha on 7 May 1956, and on 9 May, the House moved and adopted a motion to refer the bill to a Joint Committee of the Houses of Parliament. This motion was concurred in the Rajya Sabha on 16 May 1956. The Joint Committee presented its Report to the Lok Sabha on 23 May 1956, recommending that the Bill be passed, as no amendments to it were necessary. The Bill was then considered and passed by the Lok Sabha on 29 May 1956. A formal amendment, moved by then Minister of Finance C.D. Deshmukh, substituting the brackets and words "(Tenth Amendment)" in clause 1 by the brackets and words "(Sixth Amendment)", was also adopted. Clause 2 (seeking insertion of a new Entry 92A in the Union List of the Seventh Schedule), clause 3 (amending article 269) and clause 4 (amending article 286) were adopted in their original form. The Bill, as passed by the Lok Sabha, was considered and passed by the Rajya Sabha on 31 May 1956. The bill, after ratification by the States, received assent from then President Rajendra Prasad on 11 September 1956. It was notified in The Gazette of India, and came into force on the same date.

== Ratification ==
The Bill was passed in accordance with the provisions of Article 368 of the Constitution, and was ratified by the Legislatures of more than one-half of the States specified in Parts A and B of the First Schedule by resolutions to that effect passed by those Legislatures before the Bill making provision for such amendment is presented to the President for assent, as required by the said article. State Legislatures that ratified the amendment are listed below:

1. Andhra State
2. Assam
3. Hyderabad
4. Madhya Bharat
5. Madhya Pradesh
6. Madras
7. Punjab
8. Patiala and East Punjab States Union
9. Saurashtra
10. Uttar Pradesh
11. West Bengal

Did not ratify:

1. Bihar
2. Bombay
3. Orissa
4. Jammu and Kashmir
5. Mysore
6. Rajasthan
7. Travancore-Cochin
8. Vindhya Pradesh

== See also ==
- List of amendments of the Constitution of India
