= Article 371D of the Constitution of India =

Safeguards the rights of local people in employment and education

Parliament of India
- Long title: An article to make special provisions with respect to the State of Andhra Pradesh provide, having regard to the requirements of the State as a whole, for equitable opportunities and facilities for the people belonging to different parts of the State, in the matter of public employment and in the matter of education, and different provisions may be made for various parts of the State.
- Citation: Act No. 32 of 1973
- Territorial extent: The State of Andhra Pradesh (Today, the States of Andhra Pradesh and Telangana)
- Passed by: Lok Sabha
- Passed: 1973
- Passed by: Rajya Sabha
- Passed: 1973
- Assented to by: President of India
- Assented to: 3rd May 1974
- Commenced: 3rd May 1974

Initiating chamber: Lok Sabha
- Introduced by: Uma Shankar Dikshit
- Introduced: 12th December 1973
- Status: In force

Article 371 (D) forms a part of the Constitution of India. It safeguards the rights of local people in employment and education and was created after agitation in the state of Andhra Pradesh. It was incorporated as the 32nd Amendment of the Constitution in 1973. It has become a bone of contention for the bifurcation of the state of Andhra Pradesh and Telangana.
