= Department of Publication =

The Department of Publication, a subordinate office of the Ministry of Housing and Urban Affairs at Government of India acquires, stocks and makes available books on various subjects.

It became an independent department in 1973 and provides all government publications. It provides information on publication programs, various agents and agencies along with information on publishing and distribution.
