= The Gazette of India =

Government gazette of India

- Type: Government Gazette
- Publisher: Government of India Press
- Language: Hindi, English
- Headquarters: New Delhi
- City: New Delhi
- ISSN: 0254-6779
- OCLC number: 1752771
- Website: egazette.gov.in

The Gazette of India is a public journal and an authorised legal document of the Government of India. It is published weekly by the Directorate of Printing Department of Publication, a subordinate office of the Ministry of Housing and Urban Affairs and printed by the Government of India Press.

As a public journal, The Gazette prints official notices from the government. Publishing information in the Gazette is a legal necessity by which official documents come into force and enter the public domain.

Ordinary gazettes are regularly published weekly on a particular day of the week whereas extraordinary gazettes may be published on any day depending upon the urgency of the matters to be published.

== Publication ==
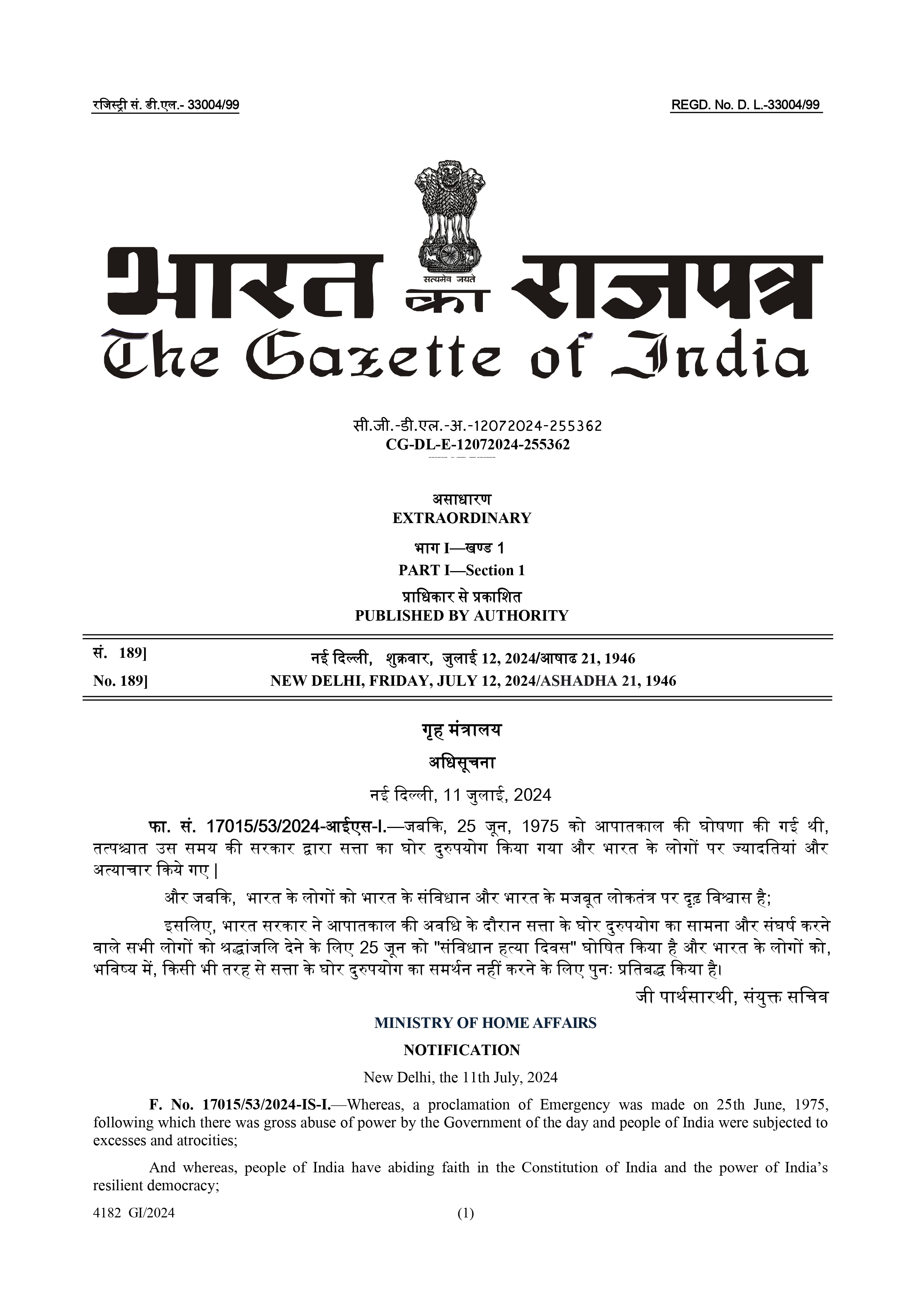
A gazette notification issued by Ministry of Home Affairs (India) in 2024

The publication of The Gazette is executed as per the government of India (allocation of business rules) issued from time to time by the cabinet secretariat.

The Department of Publication is headed by the controller of publications with the assistance of two assistant controllers, one financial officer and an assistant director. The Gazette employs more than 270 people under the supervision of the Ministry of Housing and Urban Affairs, headquartered in Kartavya Bhavan-3, New Delhi.

The controller of publication is the authorized publisher, custodian and seller of Government of India Publications and periodicals, including The Gazette of India and Delhi Gazette with its copyright. It undertakes storage, sale and distribution of all saleable publications brought out by various ministries and departments.

The Ministry of Housing and Urban Affairs began publishing an electronic version of The Gazette in 2008.

"Gazetted officers" are Indian government servants whose appointments have been notified in The Gazette of India.

== Gazetted officer ==
Gazetted Officers are executive/managerial level ranked government officers in India. Authority for a gazetted officer to issue an official stamp comes from the President of India or the Governors of States. To that effect, they are de jure representatives and delegates of the Indian State and the President. If a person's name is published in the Gazette of India or any state government gazette, he/she is called Gazetted. Any appointment released and published in the government gazette is called a gazetted appointment. The Gazette of India and state gazettes are official government publications, which publish the appointments or promotions of certain government officials along with other government ordinary/extraordinary notifications. An officer, who is appointed under the seal of the Governor at state level or by the President of India at the national level (and in the Union Territories), requires being listed in the Gazette of India or state government gazette and is considered to be a Gazetted Officer. Many are honorary Justices of the Peace and have the same standing as some of the government officer. Such officers, among other functions, have the power to verify the documents for financial, industrial, immigration and other purposes. A notary public is also a gazetted officer.

== See also ==
- Gazette
- The Imperial Gazetteer of India
- List of government gazettes
