= Anglo-Indian reserved seat in the Bihar Legislative Assembly =

Former reserved seat in the Bihar Legislative Assembly

Between 1952 and 2020, a single seat was reserved in the Bihar Legislative Assembly, for members of the Anglo-Indian community. This member was nominated by the Governor of Bihar on the advice of the Government of Bihar. In January 2020, the Anglo-Indian reserved seats in the Lok Sabha and state legislative assemblies of India were discontinued by the 126th Constitutional Amendment Bill, 2019, when enacted as the 104th Constitutional Amendment Act, 2019.

The Article 331 of the Indian Constitution gave reservation to the Anglo-Indian community during the creation of the Constitution, the article 331 also says that this reservation would cease to exist 10 years after the commencement of the Constitution. But this reservation was extended to 1970 through the 8th Amendment. The period of reservation was extended to 1980 through 23rd amendment and then to 1990 through 45th amendments, to 2000 through 62nd amendment, to 2010 through 79th amendment and to 2020 through the 95th amendment.

== List of Anglo-Indian members ==
The following is a list of members nominated after each election.

Election	Name	Assembly
1952	Michael Morris	1st
1957	Elsie Augier	2nd
1962	Elsie Augier	3rd
1967	Elsie Augier	4th
1969	Hector Angus Brown	5th
1972	Hector Angus Brown	6th
1977	Hector Angus Brown	7th
1980	Hector Angus Brown	8th
1985	Hector Angus Brown	9th
1990	Hector Angus Brown	10th
1995	Alfred George De Rozario	11th
2000	Joseph Pecheli Galstaun	12th

Galstaun was allocated to Jharkhand by the Bihar Reorganisation Act, 2000 in November 2000. Since then, till the abolition of Anglo-Indian seat in 2020 there were no Anglo-Indian member.

== See also ==
- Anglo-Indian reserved seats in the Lok Sabha
- Reserved political positions in India
