= Beatrix D'Souza =

Indian politician and social worker

Member of Parliament, Lok Sabha
- In office 1998–2004 Serving with Neville Foley (1998–1999), Denzil B. Atkinson (1999–2004)
- Preceded by: Neil O'Brien & Hedwig Rego
- Succeeded by: Ingrid McLeod & Francis Fanthome
- Constituency: Anglo-Indian, Tamil Nadu

Member of the Tamil Nadu Legislative Assembly
- In office 1991–1996
- Preceded by: Oscar C. Nigli
- Succeeded by: Anne D’Monte
- Constituency: Anglo-Indian

Personal details
- Born: 5 May 1935 (age 91)
- Party: Samata Party
- Profession: Social worker, professor, educationalist

Beatrix D'Souza (born 5 May 1935) is an Indian politician and social worker. She represents the Anglo-Indian community from Tamil Nadu as a member of the Samata Party (led by Uday Mandal its President).

== Education ==
D'Souza completed a Bachelor of Arts in economics and Master of Arts in English from Stella Maris College and Presidency College, University of Madras, Chennai (Tamil Nadu). She also holds a Ph.D. in Australian literature and pursued research at University of Western Australia, Perth and University of Monash, in Melbourne, Australia.

== Career ==
Since the beginning of her career, D'Souza has been associated with All India Anglo-Indian Association. She was the Founder-President of Forum of Anglo-Indian Women.
