= Rudolph Rodrigues =

Member of Lok Sabha (6th Lok Sabha)
- In office 1977–1980
- Preceded by: Marjorie Godfrey
- Succeeded by: Frank Anthony
- Constituency: Nominated Anglo-Indian

Personal details
- Born: Rudolph Rodrigues; 18 August 1932 Calcutta, Bengal Presidency, British India
- Died: 9 December 2017 (aged 85)
- Party: Janata Party
- Education: B.A. (Hons) (Calcutta); M. A. (Jadavpur); LL. B. (Calcutta)
- Alma mater: St. Xavier's College, Kolkata, Calcutta University, Kolkata, Jadavpur University, Jadavpur

Rudolph Rodrigues (18 August 1932 – 9 December 2017) was a prominent leader of the Anglo-Indian community in India. He was a Member of Parliament, representing Anglo-Indian reserved seats in the Lok Sabha, the lower house of India's Parliament as a member of the Janata Party.

Academic offices
Preceded by S. K. Chatterjee	Principal, Serampore College, Serampore (West Bengal); 1976–1977	Succeeded by S. Mukhopadhyay
Political offices
Preceded by Marjorie Godfrey	Member of Parliament, 6th Lok Sabha; 1977-1980	Succeeded by Frank Anthony
