= Paul Mantosh =

Indian politician

Member of Lok Sabha
- In office 1990–1991
- Preceded by: Frank Anthony
- Succeeded by: Frank Anthony
- Constituency: Nominated Anglo-Indian

Personal details
- Born: Paul Mantosh Calcutta, West Bengal
- Other political affiliations: Indian National Congress (Organisation); Janata Party; Bharatiya Lok Dal
- Spouse: Sandra Hogg
- Children: 2
- Education: University of Calcutta
- Occupation: Political and Social Worker

Paul Mantosh is a prominent member of the Anglo-Indian community in India. He was a Member of Parliament, representing Anglo-Indian reserved seats in the Lok Sabha, the lower house of India's Parliament, as a member of the Janata Dal.

He started his political career as a youth activist in January 1967. In 1969, on the split of the Congress Party, he went with the Indian National Congress (Organisation) and in 1977 was a member of Janata Party. From 1980 to 1983, he served as Secretary of Bharatiya Lok Dal-West Bengal. Then he was a member of Janata Dal. He was nominated by the President of India to the Lok Sabha as a Member of Parliament representing the Anglo-Indian community. Prominent Anglo-Indians and even non Anglo-Indians like Mother Teresa and union minister George Fernandes recommended his nomination.

He was also Vice-President, All India Catholic Union, Executive Committee Member, Catholic Association of Bengal and regularly contributed to the Herald (Catholic weekly). He was later briefly associated with the MRA (now, IofC) led by Rajmohan Gandhi, grandson of Mahatma Gandhi.

Paul Mantosh was associated with the Jayaprakash Narayan led Anti-Emergency movement of 1975–1977, under the leadership of Karpoori Thakur, who was later Chief Minister of Bihar. Since there was total censorship of all news and newspapers and journals by the government and tens of thousands of opposition leaders and activists were put in jail without trial or court orders, Paul Mantosh and his comrades would clandestinely circulate regular news broadcasts of Radio Germany, Voice of America and BBC about the Emergency in India. The Emergency in India was finally lifted in 1977 after international pressure, specially from Willy Brandt of Germany, Chancellor Bruno Kriesky of Austria, Prime Minister Olof Palme of Sweden, Prime Minister Joop den Uyl of the Netherlands and Prime Minister Odvar Nordli of Norway, all of whose parties were in the Socialist International, to which the former Catholic seminarian turned firebrand Indian politician George Fernandes' Socialist Party also belonged.

Paul Mantosh stood for elections though unsuccessfully to Parliament (Lok Sabha) and later to Legislative Assembly of West Bengal. He is a veteran of many election campaigns including for Dr. Pratap Chandra Chunder, then Education Minister of India and for Rajmohan Gandhi in Amethi, U.P.
