= Anglo-Indian reserved seat in the Tamil Nadu Legislative Assembly =

Former reserved seat in the Tamil Nadu Legislative Assembly

Between 1952 and 2020, a single seat was reserved in the Tamil Nadu Legislative Assembly, for members of the Anglo-Indian community. This member was nominated by the Governor of Tamil Nadu on the advice of the Government of Tamil Nadu. In January 2020, the Anglo-Indian reserved seats in the Lok Sabha and state legislative assemblies of India were discontinued by the 126th Constitutional Amendment Bill of 2019, when enacted as the 104th Constitutional Amendment Act, 2019.

The Article 331 of the Indian Constitution gave reservation to the Anglo-Indian community during the creation of the Constitution, the article 331 also says that this reservation would cease to exist 10 years after the commencement of the Constitution. But this reservation was extended to 1970 through the 8th Amendment. The period of reservation was extended to 1980 through 23rd amendment and then to 1990 through 45th amendments, to 2006 through 62nd amendment, to 2010 through 79th amendments and to 2020 through the 95th Amendment.

== List of Anglo-Indian members ==
The following is a list of members nominated after each election.

=== Madras Legislative Assembly ===
Election	Name	Assembly	Ref.
1952	W. J. Fernandes	1st	
1957	Alice Suares	2nd	
1962	Alice Suares	3rd	
1967	Alice Suares	4th	

=== Tamil Nadu Legislative Assembly ===
Election	Name	Assembly	Ref.
1971	Alda Milicent Fowler	5th	
1977	Margaret Elisabeth Felix	6th	
1980	Margaret Elisabeth Felix	7th	
1984	G. K. Francis	8th	
1989	Oscar C. Nigli	9th	
1991	Beatrix D’Souza	10th	
1996	Anne D’Monte	11th	
2001	Sandra Dawn Grewal	12th	
2006	Oscar C. Nigli	13th	
2011	Nancy Ann Cynthia Francis	14th	
2016	Nancy Ann Cynthia Francis	15th	

== See also ==
- Anglo-Indian reserved seats in the Lok Sabha
- Reserved political positions in India
