= Neville Foley =

Indian politician

Member of Lok Sabha
- In office 1998–1999
- Preceded by: Hedwig Rego
- Succeeded by: Denzil B. Atkinson
- Constituency: Nominated Anglo-Indian

Personal details
- Born: Neville Foley; 14 September 1936 Sonepur, Bihar
- Party: Samata Party
- Spouse: Caroline Foley
- Children: Four sons
- Occupation: Military Service and Management Consultant

Neville Foley was a prominent leader of the Anglo-Indian community in India. He was a Member of Parliament, representing Anglo-Indian reserved seats in the Lok Sabha the lower house of India's Parliament as a member of the Samata Party (Uday Mandal is current President).
