= Nancy Ann Cynthia Francis =

Indian politician

Member of the Tamil Nadu Legislative Assembly
- In office May 2011 – May 2021
- Preceded by: Oscar C. Nigli
- Succeeded by: Anglo-Indian seat abolished
- Constituency: Anglo-Indian (Nominated)

Personal details
- Born: 4 May 1955 (age 71) Alleppey, Travancore–Cochin, India (present-day Kerala)
- Education: MBBS, DA
- Occupation: Doctor

Nancy Ann Cynthia Francis is a former member of the Tamil Nadu Legislative Assembly. She was a non-elected, nominated member who represented the Anglo-Indian community. She is a medical doctor by profession and works at the Meenakshi Mission Hospital and Research Centre, Madurai. At the time of her first nomination, in 2011, she was also president of the All India Anglo-Indian Association. She was renominated in 2016 for a second term, despite criticism of her performance from some members of the Anglo-Indian community.
