= Anglo-Indian reserved seat in the Uttarakhand Legislative Assembly =

Former reserved seat in the Uttarakhand Legislative Assembly

Between 2002 and 2020, a single seat was reserved in the Uttarakhand Legislative Assembly, for members of the Anglo-Indian community. This member was nominated by the Governor of Uttarakhand on the advice of the Government of Uttarakhand. In January 2020, the Anglo-Indian reserved seats in the Lok Sabha and state legislative assemblies of India were discontinued by the 126th Constitutional Amendment Bill of 2019, when enacted as the 104th Constitutional Amendment Act, 2019.

The Article 331 of the Indian Constitution gave reservation to the Anglo-Indian community during the creation of the Constitution, the article 331 also says that this reservation would cease to exist 10 years after the commencement of the Constitution. But this reservation was extended to 1970 through the 8th Amendment. The period of reservation was extended to 1980 through 23rd amendment and then to 1990 through 45th amendments, to 2006 through 62nd amendment, to 2010 through 79th amendments and to 2020 through the 95th Amendment.

== List of Anglo-Indian members in the Uttarakhand Legislative Assembly ==
The following is a list of members nominated after each election.

Election	Name	Party	Assembly	Ref.
2002	Russell Valentine Gardner	Indian National Congress	1st Assembly	
2007	Karen Meyer Hilton	Bharatiya Janata Party	2nd Assembly	
2012	Russell Valentine Gardner	Indian National Congress	3rd Assembly	
2017	George Ivan Gregory Mann	Bharatiya Janata Party	4th Assembly	

== See also ==
- Anglo-Indian reserved seats in the Lok Sabha
- List of former constituencies of the Uttarakhand Legislative Assembly
- Reserved political positions in India
