= Denzil B. Atkinson =

Indian politician (1947-2015)

Member of Lok Sabha
- In office 1999–2004
- Preceded by: Neville Foley
- Succeeded by: Francis Fanthome
- Constituency: Nominated Anglo-Indian

Personal details
- Born: Denzil B. Atkinson; 13 August 1947 Tiruchirapalli, Tamil Nadu
- Died: 14 May 2015 Hyderabad, Telangana
- Party: Bharatiya Janata Party
- Spouse: Maureen Atkinson (m. 1965)
- Occupation: Politician, Social Worker

Denzil B. Atkinson (13 August 1947 – 14 May 2015) was a prominent leader of the Anglo-Indian community in India.

He was a Member of Parliament, representing Anglo-Indian reserved seats in the Lok Sabha the lower house of India's Parliament as a member of the Bharatiya Janata Party.
