= Sixty-second Amendment of the Constitution of India =

Indian Constitutional Act

The Constitution (Sixty-second Amendment) Act, 1989

Parliament of India
- Long title: An Act further to amend the Constitution of India.
- Citation: 62nd Amendment
- Territorial extent: India
- Passed by: Rajya Sabha
- Passed: 21 December 1989
- Passed by: Lok Sabha
- Passed: 26 December 1989
- Assented to: 25 January 1990
- Signed by: R. Venkataraman
- Commenced: 25 January 1990
- Date of expiry: 26 January 2000

Legislative history

First chamber: Rajya Sabha
- Bill title: The Constitution (Sixty-second Amendment) Bill, 1989
- Introduced by: Ram Vilas Paswan
- Introduced: 16 December 1989

Related legislation
- 8th, 23rd, 45th, 79th and 95th Amendments

Summary
- Extended the period of reservation of seats for the Scheduled Castes and Scheduled Tribes and Anglo-Indians in the Lok Sabha and the State Legislative Assemblies till 2000.
- Status: Spent

The Sixty-second Amendment of the Constitution of India, officially known as The Constitution (Sixty-second Amendment) Act, 1989, extended the period of reservation of seats for the Scheduled Castes and Scheduled Tribes and representation of the Anglo-Indians in the Lok Sabha and the State Legislative Assemblies for another ten years, i.e. up to 26 January 2000.

Article 334 of the Constitution had originally required the reservation of seats to cease in 1960, but this was extended to 1970 by the 8th Amendment. The period of reservation was extended to 1980 and 1990 by the 23rd and 45th Amendments respectively. The 62nd Amendment extended the period of reservation to 2000. The period of reservation was further extended to 2010, 2020 and 2030 by the 79th and 95th and 104th Amendments respectively.

== Text ==
BE it enacted by Parliament in the Fortieth Year of the Republic of India as follows:---

1. Short title and commencement (1) This Act may be called the Constitution (Sixty-second Amendment) Act, 1989.
(2) It shall be deemed to have come into force on the date on which the Bill for this Act is introduced in the Council of States.

2. Amendment of article 334 In article 334 of the Constitution, for the words "forty years", the words "fifty years" shall be substituted.

The full text of Article 334 of the Constitution, after the 62nd Amendment, is given below:

334. Notwithstanding anything in the foregoing provisions of this Part [Part XVI], the provisions of this Constitution relating to—

(a) the reservation of seats for the Scheduled Castes and the Scheduled Tribes in the House of the People and in the Legislative Assemblies of the States; and
(b) the representation of the Anglo Indian community in the House of the People and in the Legislative Assemblies of the States by nomination,
shall cease to have effect on the expiration of a period of ~~forty years~~ fifty years from the commencement of this Constitution: Provided that nothing in this article shall affect any representation in the House of the People or in the legislative Assembly of a State until the dissolution of the then existing House or Assembly, as the case may be.

== Proposal and enactment ==
The Constitution (Sixty-second Amendment) Bill, 1989 (Bill No. 26 of 1989) was introduced in the Rajya Sabha on 20 December 1989. It was introduced by Ram Vilas Paswan, then Minister of Labour and Welfare, and sought to amend article 334 of the Constitution relating to reservation of seats for the Scheduled Castes and the Scheduled Tribes and special representation of the Anglo-Indian community in the House of the People and in the Legislative Assemblies of the States. The full text of the Statement of Objects and Reasons appended to the bill is given below:

Article 334 of the Constitution lays down that the provisions of the Constitution relating to the reservation of seats for the Scheduled Castes and the Scheduled Tribes and the representation of the Anglo-Indian community by nomination in the Lok Sabha and in the Legislative Assemblies of the States shall cease to have effect on the expiration of a period of forty years from the commencement of the

Constitution. Although the Scheduled Castes and the Scheduled Tribes have made some progress in the last forty years, the reasons which weighed with the Constituent Assembly in making provisions with regard to the aforesaid reservation of seats and nomination of members, have not ceased to exist. It is, therefore, proposed to continue the reservation for the Scheduled Castes and the Scheduled Tribes and the representation of the Anglo-Indians by nomination for a further period of ten years.

2. The Bill seeks to achieve the above object.

— Ram Vilas Paswan, "The Constitution (Sixty-second Amendment) Bill, 1989". This article incorporates text from this source, which is in the public domain.

The Bill was debated by the Rajya Sabha on 21 December, and passed on the same day. It was then considered by the Lok Sabha on 22 and 26 December, and was passed on 26 December 1989. The bill, after ratification by the States, received assent from then President K. R. Narayanan on 25 January 1990, and was notified in The Gazette of India on the same date. It retroactively came into effect on the date on which the Bill for this amendment Act was introduced in the Rajya Sabha (i.e., 20 December 1989).

== Ratification ==
The Act was passed in accordance with the provisions of Article 368 of the Constitution, and was ratified by more than half of the State Legislatures, as required under Clause (2) of the said article. State Legislatures that ratified the amendment are listed below:

1. Andhra Pradesh
2. Gujarat
3. Haryana
4. Himachal Pradesh
5. Karnataka
6. Kerala
7. Meghalaya
8. Mizoram
9. Nagaland
10. Orissa
11. Rajasthan
12. Sikkim
13. Tamil Nadu
14. Uttar Pradesh
15. West Bengal

Did not ratify:

1. Arunachal Pradesh
2. Assam
3. Bihar
4. Goa
5. Jammu and Kashmir
6. Madhya Pradesh
7. Maharashtra
8. Manipur
9. Punjab
10. Tripura

== See also ==
- List of amendments of the Constitution of India
