= Eighth Amendment of the Constitution of India =

The Constitution (Eighth Amendment) Act, 1959

Parliament of India
- Long title: An Act further to amend the Constitution of India.
- Citation: 8th Amendment
- Territorial extent: India
- Passed by: Lok Sabha
- Passed: 1 December 1959
- Passed by: Rajya Sabha
- Passed: 7 December 1959
- Assented to: 5 January 1960
- Signed by: Rajendra Prasad
- Commenced: 5 January 1960
- Date of expiry: 26 January 1970

Legislative history

First chamber: Lok Sabha
- Bill title: The Constitution (Eighth Amendment) Bill, 1959
- Introduced by: Govind Ballabh Pant
- Introduced: 16 November 1959

Related legislation
- 23rd, 45th, 62nd, 79th and 95th Amendments

Summary
- Extended the period of reservation of seats for the Scheduled Castes and Scheduled Tribes and Anglo-Indians in the Lok Sabha and the State Legislative Assemblies till 1970
- Status: Spent

The Eighth Amendment of the Constitution of India, officially known as The Constitution (Eighth Amendment) Act, 1959, amended article 334 of the Constitution in order to extend the period of reservation of seats for the Scheduled Castes and Scheduled Tribes and representation of the Anglo-Indians in the Lok Sabha and the State Legislative Assemblies for ten years, i.e. up to 26 January 1970. Article 334 had stipulated that the reservation of seats should expire within a period of ten years from the commencement of the Constitution (i.e. 26 January 1960).

The 8th Amendment extended the period for reservations to 1970. The period of reservation was extended to 1980, 1990, 2000, 2010, 2020 and 2030 by the 23rd, 45th, 62nd, 79th, 95th and 104th Amendments respectively.

== Text ==
BE it enacted by Parliament in the Tenth Year of the Republic of India as follows:---

1. Short title This Act may be called the Constitution (Eighth Amendment) Act, 1959.

2. Amendment of article 334 In article 334 of the Constitution, for the words "ten years" the words "twenty years" shall be substituted.

The full text of Article 334 of the Constitution, after the 8th Amendment, is given below:

334. Notwithstanding anything in the foregoing provisions of this Part [Part XVI], the provisions of this Constitution relating to—

(a) the reservation of seats for the Scheduled Castes and the Scheduled Tribes in the House of the People and in the Legislative Assemblies of the States; and
(b) the representation of the Anglo Indian community in the House of the People and in the Legislative Assemblies of the States by nomination,
shall cease to have effect on the expiration of a period of ~~ten years~~ twenty years from the commencement of this Constitution: Provided that nothing in this article shall affect any representation in the House of the People or in the legislative Assembly of a State until the dissolution of the then existing House or Assembly, as the case may be.

== Proposal and enactment ==
Article 334 of the Constitution laid down that the provisions of the Constitution relating to the reservation of seats for the Scheduled Castes and Scheduled Tribes and the representation of the Anglo-Indian community by nomination in the House of the People and the Legislative Assemblies of the States would cease to have effect on the expiration of a period of ten years from the commencement of the Constitution (i.e., it would expire in 1960). According to the Statement of Objects and Reasons appended to the bill, "Although the Scheduled Castes and Scheduled Tribes had made considerable progress in the last ten years, the reasons which weighed with the Constituent Assembly in making provision for the aforesaid reservation of seats and nomination of members had not ceased to exist." The government proposed that the reservation and the representation of Anglo-Indians by nomination be continued for a further period of ten years. In extending the period of nomination of members of the Anglo- Indian community, it was also proposed to fix the number of such members who might be nominated by Governors to State Assemblies and an amendment of article 333 was accordingly proposed.

The Constitution (Eighth Amendment) Bill, 1959 (Bill No. 79 of 1959) was introduced in the Lok Sabha on 16 November 1959. It was introduced by Pandit Govind Ballabh Pant, then Minister of Home Affairs, and sought to amend articles 333 and 334 of the Constitution. The bill was debated by the Lok Sabha on 30 November and 1 December. A motion to adopt clause 2 of the bill, which sought to amend article 333 of the Constitution, failed to get a majority of the total membership of the House (though more than two-thirds of the members present and voting had voted in favour of the motion). The said clause was omitted from the Bill. Clause 3 of the bill, which sought an amendment of article 334, was adopted in its original form by the Lok Sabha on 1 December. The bill, with the omission of clause 2, was passed by the House on 1 December 1959. Clause 3 was then re-numbered as clause 2, and the bill was considered and adopted by the Rajya Sabha on 7 December 1959.

The bill, after ratification by the States, received assent from then President Rajendra Prasad on 5 January 1960, came into force on the same date. It was notified in The Gazette of India on 6 January 1960.

== Ratification ==
The Act was passed in accordance with the provisions of Article 368 of the Constitution, and was ratified by more than half of the State Legislatures, as required under Clause (2) of the said article. State Legislatures that ratified the amendment are listed below:

1. Andhra Pradesh
2. Assam
3. Bombay
4. Madras
5. Mysore
6. Orissa
7. Punjab
8. Rajasthan
9. Uttar Pradesh
10. West Bengal

Did not ratify:

1. Bihar
2. Jammu and Kashmir
3. Kerala
4. Madhya Pradesh
