= Anglo-Indian reserved seats in the Lok Sabha =

Former reserved seats in the Lok Sabha

Between 1952 and 2020, two seats were reserved in the Lok Sabha, the lower house of the Parliament of India, for members of the Anglo-Indian community. These two members were nominated by the President of India on the advice of the Government of India. In January 2020, the Anglo-Indian reserved seats in the Lok Sabha and state legislative assemblies of India were discontinued by the 126th Constitutional Amendment Bill of 2019, when enacted as the 104th Constitutional Amendment Act, 2019.

The Article 331 of the Indian Constitution gave reservation to the Anglo-Indian community during the creation of the Constitution, the article 331 also says that this reservation would cease to exist 10 years after the commencement of the Constitution. But this reservation was extended to 1970 through the 8th Amendment. The period of reservation was extended to 1980 through 23rd amendment and then to 1990 through 45th amendments, to 2006 through 62nd amendment, to 2010 through 79th amendments and to 2020 through the 95th Amendment. In January 2020, the Anglo-Indian reserved seats in the Parliament and State Legislatures of India were abolished by the 104th Constitutional Amendment Act, 2019. The reason cited by the Union Law Minister Ravi Shankar Prasad who introduced the Bill in the Lok Sabha is that the Anglo-Indian population in India was just 296 in the 2011 Census of India, though this figure is disputed. The total number of Anglo-Indians is disputed with estimates up to 150,000. Some sources suggest a population between 75,000 and 100,000.

== History ==
The Anglo-Indian community were the only community in India that had its own representatives nominated to the Lok Sabha (lower house) in the Parliament of India. This right was secured from Jawaharlal Nehru by Frank Anthony, the first and long-time president of the All India Anglo-Indian Association. The community was represented by two members. This was done because the community had no native state of its own. Fourteen states of India (Andhra Pradesh, Bihar, Chhattisgarh, Gujarat, Jharkhand, Karnataka, Kerala, Madhya Pradesh, Maharashtra, Telangana, Tamil Nadu, Uttar Pradesh, Uttarakhand and West Bengal) also had a nominated member each in their respective State Legislative Assemblies.

The reserved seats were expected to have been phased out by the 1960s, but continued to be renewed by successive governments, until this provision was abolished in 2020. Law Minister Ravi Shankar Prasad cited the 2011 Census as counting merely 296 Anglo-Indians in India, prompting challenges from many opposition MPs. Kanimozhi of the DMK party pointed out that the state Tamil Nadu alone had a few thousand Anglo-Indians.

=== Before independence ===
Henry Gidney was a nominated member of the Central Legislative Assembly under the 'Special Interests/Anglo-Indian' category in the 1920, 1923, 1926, 1930, and 1934 elections.

== List of Anglo-Indian members in the Lok Sabha ==
The following is a list of members nominated for the seats in each Lok Sabha.

Lok Sabha	Member 1		Member 2	
Lok Sabha	Name	Party	Name	Party
1st	Frank Anthony	Independent	A. E. T. Barrow	Independent
2nd	Frank Anthony	Independent	A. E. T. Barrow	Independent
3rd	Frank Anthony	Independent	A. E. T. Barrow	Independent
4th	Frank Anthony	Independent	A. E. T. Barrow	Independent
5th	Frank Anthony	Independent	Marjorie Godfrey	Independent
6th	Rudolph Rodrigues	Janata Party	A. E. T. Barrow	Independent
7th	Frank Anthony	Indian National Congress	A. E. T. Barrow	Indian National Congress
8th	Frank Anthony	Indian National Congress	A. E. T. Barrow	Indian National Congress
9th	Joss Fernandez	Janata Dal	Paul Mantosh	Janata Dal
10th	Frank Anthony	Indian National Congress	Robert E. Williams	Indian National Congress
10th	Sheila F. Irani	Indian National Congress	Robert E. Williams	Indian National Congress
11th	Neil O'Brien	Indian National Congress	Hedwig Rego	Indian National Congress
12th	Beatrix D'Souza	Samata Party	Neville Foley	Samata Party
13th	Beatrix D'Souza	Samata Party	Denzil B. Atkinson	Bharatiya Janata Party
14th	Ingrid McLeod	Indian National Congress	Francis Fanthome	Indian National Congress
15th	Ingrid McLeod	Indian National Congress	Charles Dias	Indian National Congress
16th	George Baker	Bharatiya Janata Party	Richard Hay	Bharatiya Janata Party

== See also ==
- Anglo-Indian reserved seat in the Uttarakhand Legislative Assembly
- List of former constituencies of the Lok Sabha
- Reserved political positions in India
