= Seventy-ninth Amendment of the Constitution of India =

Indian Constitution (Seventy-ninth Amendment) Act, 1999

The Constitution (Seventy-ninth Amendment) Act, 1999

Parliament of India
- Long title: An Act further to amend the Constitution of India.
- Citation: 79th Amendment
- Territorial extent: India
- Passed by: Lok Sabha
- Passed: 27 October 1999
- Passed by: Rajya Sabha
- Passed: 28 October 1999
- Assented to: 21 January 2000
- Signed by: K. R. Narayanan
- Commenced: 25 January 2000
- Date of expiry: 26 January 2010

Legislative history

Initiating chamber: Lok Sabha
- Bill title: Constitution (Eighty-fourth Amendment) Bill, 1999
- Introduced by: Ram Jethmalani
- Introduced: 26 October 1999

Related legislation
- 8th, 23rd, 45th, 62nd and 95th Amendments

Summary
- Extended the period of reservation of seats for the Scheduled Castes and Scheduled Tribes and Anglo-Indians in the Lok Sabha and the State Legislative Assemblies till 2010.
- Status: Spent

The Seventy-ninth Amendment of the Constitution of India, officially known as The Constitution (Seventy-ninth Amendment) Act, 1999, extended the period of reservation of seats for the Scheduled Castes and Scheduled Tribes and representation of the Anglo-Indians in the Lok Sabha and the State Legislative Assemblies for another ten years, i.e. up to 26 January 2010.

Article 334 of the Constitution had originally required the reservation of seats to cease in 1960, but this was extended to 1970 by the 8th Amendment. The period of reservation was extended to 1980, 1990, and 2000 by the 23rd, 45th and 62nd Amendments respectively. The 79th Amendment extended this period to 2010. The period of reservation was further extended to 2020 and 2030 by the 95th and 104th Amendments.

== Text ==
BE it enacted by Parliament in the Fiftieth Year of the Republic of India as follows:---

1. Short title and commencement (1) This Act may be called the Constitution (Seventy-ninth Amendment) Act, 1999.

(2) It shall come into force on the 25th day of January, 2000.

2. Amendment of article 334 In article 334 of the Constitution, for the words "fifty years", the words "sixty years" shall be substituted.

The full text of Article 334 of the Constitution, after the 79th Amendment, is given below:

334. Notwithstanding anything in the foregoing provisions of this Part [Part XVI], the provisions of this Constitution relating to—

(a) the reservation of seats for the Scheduled Castes and the Scheduled Tribes in the House of the People and in the Legislative Assemblies of the States; and
(b) the representation of the Anglo Indian community in the House of the People and in the Legislative Assemblies of the States by nomination,
shall cease to have effect on the expiration of a period of ~~fifty years~~ sixty years from the commencement of this Constitution: Provided that nothing in this article shall affect any representation in the House of the People or in the legislative Assembly of a State until the dissolution of the then existing House or Assembly, as the case may be.

== Proposal and enactment ==
The bill of The Constitution (Seventy-ninth Amendment) Act, 1999 was introduced in the Lok Sabha on 26 October 1999, as the Constitution (Eighty-fourth Amendment) Bill, 1999 (Bill No. 67 of 1999). It was introduced by Ram Jethmalani, then Minister of Law, Justice and Company Affairs, and sought to amend article 334 of the Constitution relating to reservation of seats for the Scheduled Castes and the Scheduled Tribes and special representation of the Anglo-Indian community in the House of the People and in the Legislative Assemblies of the States. The full text of the Statement of Objects and Reasons appended to the bill is given below:

Article 334 of the Constitution lays down that the provisions of the Constitution relating to the reservation of seats for the Scheduled Castes and the Scheduled Tribes and the representation of Anglo-Indian community by nomination in the Lok Sabha and in the Legislative Assemblies of the States shall cease to have effect on the expiration of a period of fifty years from the commencement of the Constitution. Although the Scheduled Castes and the Scheduled Tribes have made considerable progress in the last fifty years, the reasons which weighed with the Constituent Assembly in making provisions with regard to the aforesaid reservation of seats and nomination of members, have not ceased to exist. It is, therefore, proposed to continue the reservation for the Scheduled Castes and the Scheduled Tribes and the representation of the Anglo-Indians by nomination for a further period of ten years.

The Bill seeks to achieve the above object.

— Ram Jethmalani, "The Constitution (Eighty-fourth Amendment) Bill, 1999". This article incorporates text from this source, which is in the public domain.

The Bill was considered by the Lok Sabha on 27 October 1999, and was passed on the same day with a formal amendment changing the short title from "Eighty-fourth" to "Seventy-ninth". The Bill, as passed by the Lok Sabha, was debated and passed by the Rajya Sabha on 28 October 1999. The bill, after ratification by the States, received assent from then President K. R. Narayanan on 21 January 2000, and was notified in The Gazette of India on the same date. The 79th Amendment came into force on 25 January 2000.

== Ratification ==
The Act was passed in accordance with the provisions of Article 368 of the Constitution, and was ratified by more than half of the State Legislatures, as required under Clause (2) of the said article. State Legislatures that ratified the amendment are listed below:

1. Assam
2. Bihar
3. Goa
4. Haryana
5. Himachal Pradesh
6. Karnataka
7. Kerala
8. Maharashtra
9. Manipur
10. Mizoram
11. Nagaland
12. Orissa
13. Tamil Nadu
14. Uttar Pradesh
15. West Bengal

Did not ratify:

1. Andhra Pradesh
2. Arunachal Pradesh
3. Gujarat
4. Jammu and Kashmir
5. Madhya Pradesh
6. Meghalaya
7. Punjab
8. Rajasthan
9. Sikkim
10. Tripura

== See also ==
- List of amendments of the Constitution of India
