= Margaret Elisabeth Felix =

Indian educator

Member of the Tamil Nadu Legislative Assembly
- In office 1977–1984
- Preceded by: Alda Milicent Fowler
- Succeeded by: G. K. Francis
- Constituency: Anglo-Indian

Personal details
- Born: Margaret Elisabeth; 27 January 1937
- Died: 20 November 2024 (aged 87)
- Resting place: Kilpauk Cemetery
- Spouse: Clement Felix (died 2017)

Margaret Elisabeth Felix (27 January 1937 – 20 November 2024) was an Indian educator active in the state of Tamil Nadu. She had served two terms in the Tamil Nadu Legislative Assembly: Sixth (1977–80) and Seventh (1980–84) as a nominated member belonging to the Anglo-Indian community.

== Early life ==
Born in Tamil Nadu (then Madras State) on 27 January 1937, Margaret Elisabeth attended the Doveton Corrie Girls' High School. She received her Master of Arts degree from Queen Mary's College, Chennai and did her Teachers' Training course from St. Christopher Training College, Chennai.

== Career ==
Felix had been a member of the state education board of Tamil Nadu and chairperson of the managing committee for C.S.I. Ewart Matriculation Higher Secondary School. She had also been the headmistress of Doveton Corrie Girls' High School.

In 1977, she was nominated to the 6th Tamil Nadu Assembly for a seat reserved for Anglo-Indian members. She continued her term in the next assembly (1980–84) too.

== Personal life ==
Felix married Clement Felix, a well known teacher and headmaster who received a National Award in recognition of his contributions to the field of education in 1991.
