= R. V. Gardner =

Indian politician

Russell Valentine Gardner

Member of the Uttarakhand Legislative Assembly
- In office 2002–2007
- Preceded by: Office established
- Succeeded by: Karen Meyer Hilton
- Constituency: Anglo-Indian
- In office 2012–2017
- Preceded by: Karen Meyer Hilton
- Succeeded by: George Ivan Gregory Mann
- Constituency: Anglo-Indian

Personal details
- Born: 17 December 1946 (age 79) Tundla
- Spouse: V. R. Gardner
- Relations: Neal Gardner (grandchild)
- Occupation: Educator

Russell Valentine Gardner is an educationist in the city of Dehradun. He has been the principal of St. Thomas' College, Dehradun for over three decades. He was also the Anglo-Indian representative in the First Uttarakhand Legislative Assembly, from 2002 to 2007, and in the Third Assembly from 2012 to 2017.
