= Joss Fernandez =

Indian politician (1927–2010)

Member of Parliament, Lok Sabha
- In office 1990–1991
- Constituency: Anglo-Indian reserved seats

Personal details
- Born: June 21, 1927 Kollam district, Kerala
- Died: 14 November 2010 (age 83) Bangalore, Karnataka
- Party: Janata Dal
- Spouse: Margaret Mary Fernandez
- Occupation: Management Consultant

Joseph Aloysius Fernandez (21 June 1927 – 14 November 2010), also known as Joss Fernandez, was an Indian politician and a Member of India's Lower House from the state of Karnataka.

He was member of the Karnataka Legislative Assembly from March 1983 to April 1989 as member of Janata Dal. Was also the President of The Anglo Indian Guild, Bangalore.
