= Della Godfrey =

Indian politician (died 2019)

Member of Legislative Assembly, Andhra Pradesh
- In office 1994–2004
- Constituency: Nominated Anglo-Indian

Personal details
- Died: 23 April 2019
- Party: Telugu Desam Party
- Parent: Marjorie Godfrey (mother)

Della Godfrey was an Indian politician from the Anglo-Indian community. She was a nominated Anglo-Indian member of the Andhra Pradesh Legislative Assembly from the Telugu Desam Party. She served for two terms.

== Biography ==
Godfrey was born and raised up in Hyderabad. Her father Allen Godfrey was an engineer at the Royal Mint for the Nizam of Hyderabad and her mother Marjorie Godfrey was an educationalist, MP and MLA. She was a student of Rosary Convent High School and Koti Women's College. She worked as a manager of the Royal Dutch Airlines. She was a nominated member of Andhra Pradesh Legislative Assembly for two terms and served till 2004. She died on 23 April 2019.
