= Twenty-third Amendment of the Constitution of India =

The Constitution (Twenty-third Amendment) Act, 1969

Parliament of India
- Long title: An Act further to amend the Constitution of India.
- Citation: 23rd Amendment
- Territorial extent: India
- Passed by: Lok Sabha
- Passed: 9 December 1969
- Passed by: Rajya Sabha
- Passed: 17 December 1969
- Assented to: 23 January 1970
- Signed by: V. V. Giri
- Commenced: 23 January 1970

Legislative history

First chamber: Lok Sabha
- Bill title: The Constitution (Twenty-third Amendment) Bill, 1969
- Introduced by: Panampilly Govinda Menon
- Introduced: 21 August 1969

Related legislation
- 8th, 45th, 62nd, 79th and 95th Amendments

Summary
- Discontinued reservation of seats for the Scheduled Tribes in Nagaland, both in the Lok Sabha and the State Legislative Assembly; stipulated that not more than one Anglo-Indian could be nominated by the Governor to any State Legislative Assembly; and extended the period of reservation of seats for the Scheduled Castes and Scheduled Tribes and Anglo-Indians in the Lok Sabha and the State Legislative Assemblies till 1980.
- Status: Amended

The Twenty-third Amendment of the Constitution of India, officially known as The Constitution (Twenty-third Amendment) Act, 1969, discontinued reservation of seats for the Scheduled Tribes in Nagaland, both in the Lok Sabha and the State Legislative Assembly and stipulated that not more than one Anglo-Indian could be nominated by the Governor to any State Legislative Assembly. Prior to the amendment, the number of Anglo-Indians who could be nominated to the State Legislative Assemblies, was left to the discretion of the Governor of the State. The amendment also extended the period of reservation of seats for the Scheduled Castes and Scheduled Tribes and representation of the Anglo-Indians in the Lok Sabha and the State Legislative Assemblies for another ten years, i.e. up to 26 January 1980.

Article 334 of the Constitution had originally required the reservation of seats to cease in 1960, but this was extended to 1970 by the 8th Amendment. The 23rd Amendment extended this period to 1980. The period of reservation was extended to 1990, 2000, 2010, 2020 and 2030 by the 45th, 62nd, 79th, 95th and 104th Amendments respectively.

== Text ==
BE it enacted by Parliament in the Twentieth Year of the Republic of India as follows:-

1. Short title This Act may be called the Constitution (Twenty-third Amendment) Act, 1969.

2. Amendment of article 330 In article 330 of the Constitution, in sub-clause (b) of clause (1), for the words "except the Scheduled Tribes in the tribal areas of Assam", the words "except the Scheduled Tribes in the tribal areas of Assam and in Nagaland" shall be substituted.

3. Amendment of article 332 In article 332 of the Constitution, in clause (1), for the words "except the Scheduled Tribes in the tribal areas of Assam", the words "except the Scheduled Tribes in the tribal areas of Assam and in Nagaland" shall be substituted.

4. Amendment of article 333. (1) In article 333 of the Constitution, for the words "nominate such number of members of the community to the Assembly as he considers appropriate", the words "nominate one member of that community to the Assembly" shall be substituted.
(2) Nothing contained in sub-section (1) shall affect any representation of the Anglo-Indian community in the Legislative Assembly of any State existing at the commencement of this Act until the dissolution of that Assembly.

5. Amendment of article 334 In article 334 of the Constitution, for the words "twenty years", the words "thirty years" shall be substituted.

The full text of Articles 333 and 334, and clause(1) of Article 330, after the 23rd Amendment, are given below:

330. (1) Seats shall be reserved in the House of the People for—

(a) the Scheduled Castes;
(b) the Scheduled Tribes ~~except the Scheduled Tribes in the tribal areas of Assam~~ except the Scheduled Tribes in the tribal areas of Assam and in Nagaland; and
(c) the Scheduled Tribes in the autonomous districts of Assam

333. Notwithstanding anything in article 170, the Governor or Rajpramukh of a State may, may, if he is of opinion that the Anglo-Indian community needs representation in the Legislative Assembly of the State and is not adequately represented therein, ~~nominate such number of members of the community to the Assembly as he considers appropriate~~ nominate one member of that community to the Assembly.

334. Notwithstanding anything in the foregoing provisions of this Part [Part XVI], the provisions of this Constitution relating to—

(a) the reservation of seats for the Scheduled Castes and the Scheduled Tribes in the House of the People and in the Legislative Assemblies of the States; and
(b) the representation of the Anglo Indian community in the House of the People and in the Legislative Assemblies of the States by nomination,
shall cease to have effect on the expiration of a period of ~~twenty years~~ thirty years from the commencement of this Constitution: Provided that nothing in this article shall affect any representation in the House of the People or in the legislative Assembly of a State until the dissolution of the then existing House or Assembly, as the case may be.

== Proposal and enactment ==
The Constitution (Twenty-third Amendment) Bill, 1969 (Bill No. 78 of 1969) was introduced in the Lok Sabha on 21 August 1969 by Panampilly Govinda Menon, then Minister of Law. The Bill sought to amend articles 330, 332, 333 and 334 of the Constitution. The full text of the Statement of Objects and Reasons appended to the bill is given below:

Article 334 of the Constitution lays down that the provisions of the Constitution relating to the reservation of seats for the Scheduled Castes and Scheduled Tribes and the representation of the Anglo-Indian community by nomination in the House of the People and the Legislative Assemblies of the States shall cease to have effect on the expiration of a period of twenty years from the commencement of the Constitution. Although the Scheduled Castes and Scheduled Tribes have made considerable progress in the last twenty years, the reasons which weighed with the Constituent Assembly in making provisions with regard to the aforesaid reservation of seats and nomination of members, have not cheapest to exist. It is, therefore, proposed to continue the reservation for the Scheduled Castes and the Scheduled Tribes and the representation of Anglo-Indians by nomination for a further period of ten years.

2. More than ninety per cent of the population of the State of Nagaland, which came into being in 1963, in tribal. It would be anomalous to make revision for reservation for Scheduled Castes and Scheduled Tribes in Legislatures in the States where they are in a majority. It is, therefore, proposed, as desired by the Government of Nagaland, not to make any reservation for the Scheduled Tribes in Nagaland either in the House of the People or in the State Legislative Assembly. Articles 330 and 332 of the Constitution are being amended for this purpose.

3. Under article 333 of the Constitution, the number of Anglo-Indians, who may be nominated to the State Legislative Assemblies, is left to the discretion of the Governor. It is now proposed to amend that article so as to provide that not more than one Anglo-Indian should be nominated by the Governor to any State Legislative Assembly. This amendment will not however affect representation of the Anglo-Indian community in the existing Legislative Assemblies until their dissolution.

— P. Govinda Menon, "The Constitution (Twenty-third Amendment) Bill, 1969". This article incorporates text from this source, which is in the public domain.

The bill was debated by the Lok Sabha on 8 and 9 December, and passed in the original form on 9 December 1969. It was considered by the Rajya Sabha on 16 and 17 December, and passed on 17 December 1969. The bill, after ratification by the States, received assent from then President V. V. Giri on 23 January 1970. It was notified in The Gazette of India and came into force on 23 January 1970. It was notified in The Gazette of India on 26 January 1970.

== Ratification ==
The Act was passed in accordance with the provisions of Article 368 of the Constitution, and was ratified by more than half of the State Legislatures, as required under Clause (2) of the said article. State Legislatures that ratified the amendment are listed below:

1. Assam
2. Kerala
3. Madhya Pradesh
4. Maharashtra
5. Mysore
6. Nagaland
7. Punjab
8. Rajasthan
9. Tamil Nadu
10. West Bengal

Did not ratify:

1. Andhra Pradesh
2. Bihar
3. Gujarat
4. Haryana
5. Jammu and Kashmir
6. Orissa
7. Uttar Pradesh

== See also ==
- List of amendments of the Constitution of India
