= Forty-fifth Amendment of the Constitution of India =

The Constitution (Forty-fifth Amendment) Act, 1980

Parliament of India
- Long title: An Act further to amend the Constitution of India.
- Citation: 45th Amendment
- Territorial extent: India
- Passed by: Lok Sabha
- Passed: 24 January 1980
- Passed by: Rajya Sabha
- Passed: 25 January 1980
- Assented to: 14 April 1980
- Signed by: Neelam Sanjiva Reddy
- Commenced: 25 January 1980
- Date of expiry: 26 January 1990

Legislative history

Initiating chamber: Lok Sabha
- Bill title: The Constitution (Forty-fifth Amendment) Bill, 1980
- Introduced by: Zail Singh
- Introduced: 16 January 1980

Related legislation
- 8th, 23rd, 62nd, 79th and 95th Amendments

Summary
- Extended the period of reservation of seats for the Scheduled Castes and Scheduled Tribes and Anglo-Indians in the Lok Sabha and the State Legislative Assemblies till 1990.
- Status: Spent

The Forty-fifth Amendment of the Constitution of India, officially known as The Constitution (Forty-fifth Amendment) Act, 1980, extended the period of reservation of seats for the Scheduled Castes and Scheduled Tribes and representation of the Anglo-Indians in the Lok Sabha and the State Legislative Assemblies for another ten years, i.e. up to 26 January 1990.

Article 334 of the Constitution had originally required the reservation of seats to cease in 1960, but this was extended to 1970 by the 8th Amendment, and the 23rd Amendment extended this period to 1980. The 45th Amendment extended the period of reservation to 1990. The period of reservation was extended to 2000, 2010, 2020 and 2030 by the 62nd, 79th, 95th and 104th Amendments respectively.

== Text ==
BE it enacted by Parliament in the Tenth Year of the Republic of India as follows:---

1. Short title and commencement (1) This Act may be called the Constitution (Forty-fifth Amendment) Act, 1980.

(2) It shall be deemed to have come into force on the 25th day of January, 1980.

2. Amendment of article 334 In article 334 of the Constitution for the words "thirty years"; the words "forty years" shall be substituted.

The full text of Article 334 of the Constitution, after the 45th Amendment, is given below:

334. Notwithstanding anything in the foregoing provisions of this Part [Part XVI], the provisions of this Constitution relating to—

(a) the reservation of seats for the Scheduled Castes and the Scheduled Tribes in the House of the People and in the Legislative Assemblies of the States; and
(b) the representation of the Anglo Indian community in the House of the People and in the Legislative Assemblies of the States by nomination,
shall cease to have effect on the expiration of a period of ~~thirty years~~ forty years from the commencement of this Constitution: Provided that nothing in this article shall affect any representation in the House of the People or in the legislative Assembly of a State until the dissolution of the then existing House or Assembly, as the case may be.

== Proposal and enactment ==
The Constitution (Forty-fifth Amendment) Bill, 1980 (Bill No. 1 of 1980) was introduced in the Lok Sabha on 23 January 1980 by Zail Singh, then Minister of Home Affairs. The Bill sought to amend article 334 of the Constitution relating to reservation of seats for the Scheduled Castes and the Scheduled Tribes and special representation of the Anglo-Indian community in the House of the People and in the Legislative Assemblies of the States. The full text of the Statement of Objects and Reasons appended to the bill is given below:

Article 334 of the Constitution lays down that the provisions of the Constitution relating to the reservation of seats for the Scheduled Castes and the Scheduled Tribes and the representation of the Anglo-Indian community by nomination in the Lok Sabha and in the Legislative Assemblies of the States shall cease to have effect on the expiration of a period of thirty years from the commencement of the Constitution. Although the Scheduled Castes and the Scheduled Tribes have made considerable progress in the last thirty years, the reasons which weighed with the Constituent Assembly in making provisions with regard to the aforesaid reservation of seats and nomination of members, have not ceased to exist. It is, therefore, proposed to continue the reservation for the Scheduled Castes and the Scheduled Tribes and the representation of Anglo-Indians by nomination for a further period of ten years.

2. The Bill seeks to achieve the above object.

— Zail Singh, "The Constitution (Forty-fifth Amendment) Bill, 1980". This article incorporates text from this source, which is in the public domain.

The Bill was debated by the Lok Sabha on 24 January 1980 and passed on the same day in the original form. The Rajya Sabha considered and passed the bill on 25 January 1980. The bill, after ratification by the States, received assent from then President Neelam Sanjiva Reddy on 14 April 1980, and was notified in The Gazette of India on the same date. It retroactively came into effect from 25 January 1980.

== Ratification ==
The Act was passed in accordance with the provisions of Article 368 of the Constitution, and was ratified by more than half of the State Legislatures, as required under Clause (2) of the said article. State Legislatures that ratified the amendment are listed below:

1. Andhra Pradesh
2. Haryana
3. Himachal Pradesh
4. Jammu and Kashmir
5. Karnataka
6. Kerala
7. Madhya Pradesh
8. Manipur
9. Meghalaya
10. Nagaland
11. Sikkim
12. Tripura
13. West Bengal

Did not ratify:

1. Assam
2. Bihar
3. Gujarat
4. Maharashtra
5. Orissa
6. Punjab
7. Rajasthan
8. Tamil Nadu
9. Uttar Pradesh

== See also ==
- List of amendments of the Constitution of India
