= Henry Gidney =

Anglo-Indian surgeon

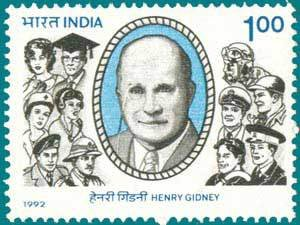
1992 Indian Stamp commemorating Sir Henry Gidney

Lieutenant Colonel Sir Henry Albert John Gidney FRSE, MRCP, FRCSE MID, MLA (9 June 1873 – 5 May 1942) was a leader of the Anglo-Indian community of British India for 20 years, founding the All India Anglo-Indian Association in 1926.

His grandfather, William Gidney, was killed at the Siege of Lucknow in 1857 but his family decided to stay in India.

== Life ==
He was born in Igatpuri in India on 9 June 1873 the son of John Gidney, an Irish engine driver for the GIPR, and his Indian wife Margaret David. He was raised a Methodist.

He received his education first at Baldwins Boys School in Bangalore, then at St Peters High School in Mazagaon, then sent home to Britain for final education in Edinburgh, to where his family had links. At 16, he joined the Calcutta Medical College at the University of Calcutta, graduating as a first-class gold medal winner. He returned again to Britain to take a Diploma in Public Health (DPH) at Cambridge University plus a further Diploma in Ophthalmology (D.O.) at the University of Oxford. He remained at Oxford as a Research Fellow, lecturing in ophthalmology, and his surgical skill in this field gained a great reputation.

At 36 years old, he was already an FRCS and MRCP.

In 1897 he went to London to sit the exams for the Indian Medical Service, which he passed in 1898. He then joined the British Indian Army, seeing action in China during the Boxer Rebellion in 1901. He was Mentioned in Dispatches by his senior officer for his actions, also being promoted from lieutenant to captain in the same year. He returned to Britain after the war but came back to India in 1906. He was promoted to major in 1909 and lieutenant colonel in 1917. In 1911 he appears to have taken an additional role as a civilian surgeon in the Kohima/ Naga Hills area. He was medically invalided out of the Indian Medical Service in 1918.

In 1911 he was elected a Fellow of the Royal Society of Edinburgh. His proposers were Sir John Halliday Croom, Sir David Prain, Sir William Turner and Sir George Andreas Berry. This membership leads some records to wrongly state him as a Fellow of the Royal Society of London which he was not (see List of Fellows of the Royal Society).

After his retirement from the Indian Army in 1919, he set up his own private eye hospital in Bombay.

In 1926, Gidney founded the All India Anglo-Indian Association.

He was knighted in 1931.

In 1941 was elected president of the All India Arts and Crafts Society.

He died in India on 5 May 1942.

== Recognition ==
The Gidney House of The Frank Anthony Public School, Delhi and Bangalore is named after him.

== Family ==
He married Grace Gidney.

== Additional achievements ==
1. Civilian surgeon in Eastern Bengal and Assam.
2. President of the Bombay branch of the Anglo-Indian Empire League (1918) (founded by Charles Palmer in 1908)
3. Vice-president of the Central Council of the Empire League (1919)
4. Member of the Legislative Assembly of India (1921)
5. He formed an association called the "Anglo-Indian and Domiciled European Association". In 1937 the association split into two factions representing India and Burma, thereafter representing both Anglo-Indians and Anglo-Burmese. The Burma section became the "Anglo-Burman Union".
