= Charles Dias =

Indian politician

Member of Parliament, Lok Sabha
- In office 2009–2014
- Preceded by: Francis Fanthome

Personal details
- Born: 26 August 1950 (age 74)

Charles Dias was an Indian politician.

== Early life and education ==
He was educated at the University of Calicut, Kerala and Annamalai University.
