= The Frank Anthony Memorial All-India Inter-School Debate =

Inter-School National level Debate Competition organised by CISCE

The Frank Anthony Memorial All-India Inter-School English Debate is held in the honor of Frank Anthony

It is an annual debate competition organised by the Council for the Indian School Certificate Examinations (CICSE). Participants represent their schools and are divided into two groups (Category I for students of Standards XI and XII and Category II for students of Standards IX and X). Over 1,600 schools participate in the event each year making it 2nd largest debate tournament in India after Indian Debate League.

The Debate competition is spread over three levels – Regional, Zonal and Nationa Levels.

Each school sends two students from each group mentioned above. The topic is only revealed to the students an hour before the actual debate by way of opening a sealed envelope in their presence. This ensures that no pre-written material can be used in the debate. Students are expected to speak for a total time period of four minutes which is followed by two minutes of questioning and rebuttals. The students are allowed to and expected to refer to journals, magazines, and other books from the library during the one hour time to generate matter for their speaking time. No internet access or use of any electronic devices is allowed and referring to a written script during their speaking time is strictly discouraged and negatively marked

The debate is only open to CISCE accredited schools.

== Various years of debate ==
=== 2009 ===
==== Round 3 – National ====
===== Category 1 =====
Date	Host School	Topic	Awards			
Date	Host School	Topic	Winner	Best Speaker	Runner-up speaker	Second runner-up speake
20 September 2008	The Frank Anthony Public School, Lajpat Nagar, New Delhi	The Youth Should Aim for the stars and Forever Remain Dissatisfied	La Martiniere Girls College, Lucknow	Shreevar Rastogi	Radhica Kaushal	

=== 2010 ===
==== Round 3 – National ====
===== Category 1 =====
Date	Host School	Topic	Awards			
Date	Host School	Topic	Winner	Best Speaker	Runner-up speaker	Second runner-up speaker
20 September 2010	St. Jude's School, Dehradun	India Should Have Compulsory Military Service	Don Bosco School, Park Circus	Francisco Romaldo Mendes		

=== 2011 ===
==== Round 3 – National ====
===== Category 2 =====
Date	Host School	Topic	Awards			
Date	Host School	Topic	Winner	Best Speaker	Runner-up speaker	Second runner-up speaker
18 April 2011	The Shri Ram School, Aravali, Gurgaon	India should abolish death penalty	Bishop Cotton School, Shimla	Akantuk Sharma	Uday Rustagi	Manisha Verma

=== 2012 ===
==== Round 3 – National ====
===== Category 2 =====
Date	Host School	Topic	Awards			
Date	Host School	Topic	Winner	Best Speaker	Runner-up speaker	Second runner-up speaker
25 September 2013	Modern High School, Calcutta	The youth of today will follow the values laid down by the older generation	Jamnabai Narsee School, Mumbai	Parth Jayaram		Vedika Walia

=== 2013 ===
==== Round 3 – National ====
===== Category 2 =====
Date	Host School	Topic	Awards			
Date	Host School	Topic	Winner	Best Speaker	Runner-up speaker	Second runner-up speaker
25 September 2013	The Frank Anthony Public School, Lajpat Nagar - IV, New Delhi	Most of the problems of students today arise from their unrestricted freedom	Jamnabai Narsee School, Mumbai	Kanishk Mittal	Maahir Shah	

===== Category 1 =====
Date	Host School	Topic	Awards			
Date	Host School	Topic	Winner	Best Speaker	Runner-up speaker	Second runner-up speaker
25 September 2013	The Frank Anthony Public School, Lajpat Nagar - IV, New Delhi	A world without discipline is lawless	Jamnabai Narsee School, Mumbai	Vedika Walia	Jaanvi Agrawal	Sidharth Nambiar

=== 2014 ===
==== Round 1 – Regional ====
The first round of debate of the year 2014 was conducted in the following schools and zones with the topic mentioned accordingly.

Region	Date	Host School	Topic	Awards	
Region	Date	Host School	Topic	Winners	First Runners-up
West	12 July 2014	Gokuldham High School, Goregaon	"Can the Environment sustain the current rate of Industrialization ?"	Lilavatibai Podar School, Mumbai	Hiranandani Foundation School, Powai
West	12 July 2014	Eklavya School, Ahmedabad	"Can the Environment sustain the current rate of Industrialization ?"	S. N. Kansagra School, Rajkot	Anandniketan, Ahmedabad

==== Round 2 – Zonal ====
Zone	Date	Host School	Topic	Awards	
Zone	Date	Host School	Topic	Winners	First Runners-up
West	19 August 2014	Bombay Scottish School, Mahim	" Can we Swap Thermal Energy for Nuclear Energy and save our environment?"	S.N. Kansangra School, Rajkot	None

==== Round 3 – National ====
Date	Host School	Topic	Awards	
Date	Host School	Topic	Winners	First Runners-up
25 September 2014	St. Gregorios High School, Chembur, Mumbai	The money spent in space research should be spent in protecting the environment	Campion School Mumbai, Sujay Choksey	-

=== 2015 ===
==== Round 1 – Regional ====
Region	Date	Classes	Host School	Topic	First Place	
Region	Date	Classes	Host School	Topic	West	15 July 2015
West	15 July 2015	11th and 12th	Jasudben ML School Khar	Today friends have replaced family	St Marys ICSE School Koperkhairane: Shlok Parida & Poornima Jacob	Bombay Scottish High School
North	15 July 2015	9th and 10th	La Martiniere College, Lucknow	Competition leads to the death of Relationships	Winners: The Frank Anthony Public School, New Delhi Jatin Jha and Oishani Chowdhary	Runners Up: Scottish High, Gurgaon
North	15 July 2015	9th and 10th	Scottish High, Gurgaon	Competition leads to the death of Relationships	Winners: St.Stephen's School, Chandigarh Pratham Kalra and Kavya Garg	
East	15 July 2015	9th and 10th	Delhi Public School, Megacity(Kolkata) South City International School	Competition leads to the death of relationships.	Winners at Delhi Public School Megacity: La Martiniere for boys, Kokata. Vidush Sinha and Arka Chaterjee Winners at South City International School: La Martinere for Girls Mihikaa Goenka and Anandini Saha	Runners Up: Our Lady Queen of the Missions. Runners Up: The Heritage School, Kolkata
South	15 July 2015	9th and 10th		Competitions lead to the death of relationships.	Winners: Hari Sri Vidhya Nidhi School, Thrissur (Kerala)	Eleza Vinod and Sangeetha T.S

==== National Rounds ====
The Category I Debate was won by The Heritage School, Kolkata, represented by Mohit Poddar and Sayantan Bhattacharyya. Mohit Poddar, of The Heritage School, Kolkata was adjudged the Best Speaker in the Finals. Loyola School, Jamshedpur were the runners-up.

The 2015 Category II debate was won by Aayush Rathod and Shrutika Mane of the Smt. Sulochanadevi Singhania School, Thane and was held in Dehradun. Loyola School, Jamshedpur was the 2nd Runners-Up in this category too.

=== 2016 ===
The first round of the debate in 2016 was on July 15. The National Round was held on September 25. Loyola School, Jamshedpur was the only school to have qualified for both the category 1 and Category 2 of the debate.

The National Winners for Category 2 were Nitya K Nair and Megha N Nair from L'ecole Chempaka, Thiruvananthapuram, Kerala. The Best Speaker was Nitya K Nair. The national runners-up were Adarsh Sriram and Shivali Shah from Dhirubhai Ambani International School, Mumbai.

=== 2018 ===
==== Round 1 – Regional ====
The first round of debate of the year 2018 was conducted in the following schools and zones with the topic mentioned accordingly.

REGION	DATE	HOST SCHOOL	TOPIC	AWARDS	
REGION	DATE	HOST SCHOOL	TOPIC	WINNERS	FIRST RUNNERS-UP
South	11 July 2018	Sandeepani Vidya Niketan, Thrichur Senior category (11th & 12th grade)	A healthy mind in a healthy body is not being encouraged in our schools.	Best Debating Team: L'ecole Chempaka, Trivandrum Best Speaker: Nitya K Nair First Runner-up Speaker: Megha N Nair	Pallikoodam
East	11 July 2018	Welland Gouldsmith School, Kolkata Junior category (9th & 10th grade)	By sparing the rod, we have spoilt the child.	Best Debating Team: Don Bosco School, Siliguri Best Speaker: Latika Agarwal (Nirmala Convent School) First Runner-up Speaker: Srijan Mitra (Don Bosco School, Siliguri)	Loreto House, Kolkata

==== National Finals 2018 ====
With the Diamond Jubilee of the council, the Frank Anthony memorial all India inter school debate competition's National finals were hosted in the Frank Anthony Public school, Delhi. The seniors round saw schools from all across India. The topic was "Famous dropouts are the ones that contribute most to society". The National champions were St. James' School Kolkata, represented by Rustam Biswas and Souti Mukhopadhyay. Souti Mukhopadhyay also won the award for best speaker in the finals.

=== ROUND 1 – REGIONAL ===
Category (II) – Class IX & X

REGION	DATE	HOST SCHOOL	TOPIC	AWARDS	
East	19 July 2019	Saifee Golden Jubilee English Public School, Kolkata	Education fosters Democracy	WINNERS	FIRST RUNNERS-UP
East	19 July 2019	Saifee Golden Jubilee English Public School, Kolkata	Education fosters Democracy	Best Debating Team: - Shuvajyoti Kar and Ayantika Bag; Saint Agnes School, Kharagpur Best Speaker: - Saswata Chakraborty; Don Bosco School, Bandel	Don Bosco School, Bandel Devyani Bhoomla; Loreto House, Kolkata

Round 2 – Zonal

▼

Zone	Date	Host School	Topic	Awards	
Zone	Date	Host School	Topic	Winners	First Runners-up
South	19 August 2019	Lakshmi School, Madurai ; Category II (9th & 10th grade)	"Democracy is only possible if there is responsible press"	Best Speaker: Michelle Simon, Pallikoodam, Kottayam Best Team: Pallikoodam, Kottayam (Michelle Simon and Thea Ann Jacob)	
West	19 August 2019	Jankidevi Public School, Andheri (West), Mumbai; Category II	"Democracy is only possible if there is a responsible press"	Best Speaker: Upasana Nandi, P.G. Garodia School Runner-up Speaker: Advait Sangle, Hiranandani Foundation School, Powai, Mumbai Best Team: Hiranandani Foundation School, Powai (Mrigaanka Sharma and Advait Sangle)	

==== Round 3 – National Finals ====
Category I
The topic for Category I was "The right to dissent is an integral part of any democracy." St. James’ School, Kolkata won the national championship for the second consecutive year, represented by Souti Mukhopadhyay and Harsh Nawal. Souti Mukhopadhyay was awarded Best Speaker, making them the only participant to have won the title in two consecutive national finals. The Heritage School, Kolkata was declared second runner-up.

Category II
The topic for Category II was "India needs an autocracy and not a democracy." The team from Hiranandani Foundation School, Powai, Mumbai, comprising Mrigaanka Sharma and Advait Sangle, won the national championship. Mrigaanka Sharma was awarded Best Speaker, and Advait Sangle was named First Runner-Up (Speaker).

Date	Host School	Topic	Awards
25 September 2019	National English School, Kolkata	"The right to dissent is an integral part of any democracy" (Category I) “India needs an autocracy and not a democracy” (Category II)	Category I Winning Team: Souti Mukhopadhyay and Harsh Nawal (St. James' School, Kolkata); Best Speaker: Souti Mukhopadhyay (St. James' School, Kolkata); 1st Runner-up (Speaker): Priyadarshini Dutt (Jamnabai Narsee School, Mumbai) Category II; Winning Team: Mrigaanka Sharma and Advait Sangle (Hiranandani Foundation, Mumbai); Best Speaker: Mrigaanka Sharma (Hiranandani Foundation, Mumbai); 1st Runner-up (Speaker): Advait Sangle (Hiranandani Foundation, Mumbai)
