= Ingrid Mcleod =

Indian politician

Member of Lok Sabha for the Anglo-Indian Community
- In office 2004-2014
- Constituency: Anglo-Indian reserved seats

Personal details
- Born: 23 December 1967 (age 58) Bilaspur, Chhattisgarh
- Party: Indian National Congress
- Spouse: Rodney Mcleod
- Children: 2
- Smt. Ingrid Mcleod's Home Page on loksabha.nic.in

Ingrid Mcleod (born 23 December 1967) is a former Lok Sabha member who represented India's Anglo-Indian community. She is from Bilaspur. She started her career as a teacher and social worker. She was nominated to Chhattisgarh assembly for nearly 2 1/2 years by the then-chief minister Ajit Jogi before being nominated to Lok Sabha in 2004. Mcleod is an active member of the Indian National Congress. She has been compared to Sonia Gandhi because of her looks.
