= Ninety-fifth Amendment of the Constitution of India =

Extended Indian reservation for Anglo-Indians

The Constitution (Ninety-fifth Amendment) Act, 2009

Parliament of India
- Long title: An Act further to amend the Constitution of India.
- Citation: 95th Amendment
- Territorial extent: India
- Passed by: Lok Sabha
- Passed: 3 August 2009
- Passed by: Rajya Sabha
- Passed: 4 August 2009
- Assented to: 18 January 2010
- Signed by: Pratibha Patil
- Commenced: 25 January 2010
- Date of expiry: 26 January 2020

Legislative history

First chamber: Lok Sabha
- Bill title: The Constitution (One Hundred and Ninth Amendment) Bill, 2009
- Bill citation: Bill No. XX of 2009
- Introduced by: M. Veerappa Moily
- Introduced: 30 July 2009

Related legislation
- 8th, 23rd, 45th, 62nd and 79th Amendments.

Summary
- Extended the period of reservation of seats for the Scheduled Castes and Scheduled Tribes and Anglo-Indians in the Lok Sabha and the State Legislative Assemblies till 2020
- Status: Spent

The Ninety-fifth Amendment of the Constitution of India, officially known as The Constitution (Ninety-fifth Amendment) Act, 2009, extended the period of reservation of seats for the Scheduled Castes and Scheduled Tribes and representation of the Anglo-Indians in the Lok Sabha and the State Legislative Assemblies for another ten years, i.e. up to 26 January 2020.

Article 334 of the Constitution had originally required the reservation of elected seats to cease in 1960, but this was extended to 1970 by the 8th Amendment. The period of reservation was extended to 1980, 1990, 2000 and 2010 by the 23rd, 45th, 62nd and 79th Amendments respectively. The 95th Amendment extended the period of reservation to 2020. The period of reservation was further extended to 2030 by the 104th Amendment.

== Text ==
BE it enacted by Parliament in the Tenth Year of the Republic of India as follows:---

1. Short title and commencement (1) This Act may be called the Constitution (Ninety-fifth Amendment) Act, 2009.

(2) It shall come into force on the 25th day of January, 2010.

2. Amendment of article 334 In article 334 of the Constitution, for the words "sixty years", the words "seventy years" shall be substituted.

The full text of Article 334 of the Constitution, after the 95th Amendment, is given below:

368. Reservation of seats and special representation to cease after ten years. Notwithstanding anything in the foregoing provisions of this Part [Part XVI], the provisions of this Constitution relating to—

(a) the reservation of seats for the Scheduled Castes and the Scheduled Tribes in the House of the People and in the Legislative Assemblies of the States; and
(b) the representation of the Anglo Indian community in the House of the People and in the Legislative Assemblies of the States by nomination,
shall cease to have effect on the expiration of a period of ~~sixty years~~ seventy years from the commencement of this Constitution: Provided that nothing in this article shall affect any representation in the House of the People or in the legislative Assembly of a State until the dissolution of the then existing House or Assembly, as the case may be.

== Proposal and enactment ==
The bill of The Constitution (Ninety-fifth Amendment) Act, 2009 was introduced in the Rajya Sabha on 30 July 2009 as the Constitution (One Hundred and Ninth Amendment) Bill, 2009 (Bill No. XX of 2009). It was introduced by M. Veerappa Moily, then Minister of Law and Justice, and sought to amend article 334 of the Constitution relating to reservation of seats for the Scheduled Castes and the Scheduled Tribes and special representation of the Anglo-Indian community in the House of the People and in the Legislative Assemblies of the States.

Article 334 of the Constitution lays down that the provisions of the Constitution relating to the reservation of seats for the Scheduled Castes and the Scheduled Tribes and the representation of the Anglo-Indian community by nomination in the House of the People and the Legislative Assemblies of the States shall cease to have effect on the expiration of the period of sixty years from the commencement of the Constitution. In other words, these provisions will cease to have effect on the 25th January 2010, if not extended further.

2.Although the Scheduled Castes and the Scheduled Tribes have made considerable progress in the last sixty years, the reasons which weighed with the Constituent Assembly in making provisions with regard to the aforesaid reservation of seats and nomination of members, have not ceased to exist. It is, therefore, proposed to continue the reservation for the Scheduled Castes and the Scheduled Tribes and the representation of Anglo-Indians by nomination for a further period of ten years.

3. The Bill seeks to achieve the above object.

— M. Veerappa Moily, "The Constitution (One Hundred and Ninth Amendment) Bill, 2009" (PDF). This article incorporates text from this source, which is in the public domain.

The bill was debated and passed by Rajya Sabha on 3 August. It was then debated by the Lok Sabha on 4 August 2009, and passed on the same date. The bill, after ratification by the States, received assent from then President on 18 January 2010, and was notified in The Gazette of India on 19 January 2010. The 95th Amendment came into effect on 25 January 2010.

The Act was passed in accordance with the provisions of Article 364 of the Constitution, and was formalized by more than half of the State Legislatures, as required under Clause (2) of the said article. State Legislatures that formalized the amendment are listed below:

- Assam (5 September 2009)
- Mizoram (19 October 2009)
- Bihar (21 December 2009)
- Manipur (14 January 2010)

== See also ==
- List of amendments of the Constitution of India
