= Sheila F. Irani =

Indian politician

- Born: June 12, 1922; Nainital, India
- Died: April 10, 2003 (aged 80)
- Occupation: Teacher
- Spouse: Farrokh K. Irani
- Children: 3

Sheila F. Irani (12 June 1922 – 10 April 2003) was an Indian teacher, educator and humanitarian. She received a Viceroy's Certificate of Merit for her volunteering as a nurse during World War II. Irani was a nominated member of the 10th Lok Sabha (1995–96) and Karnataka Legislative Assembly (1969–78).

== Early life ==
Sheila was born on 12 June 1922 at Nainital. Her parents were George Egbert Ferguson and Una Maud Ferguson. She did her teacher's training course from Bombay (now Mumbai).

== Career ==
Irani began her career as a nursery teacher in Delhi. During the Second World War, she volunteered as a nurse in St. John's Ambulance Corps and for her service, she was awarded a Viceroy's Certificate of Merit. In 1968, she founded the Ideal Jawa Rotary Children's School in Mysore, Karnataka which grew to become one of the city's most prestigious schools. Irani was also involved in humanitarian causes, tending to lepers in Mysore, working as the vice-president of an orphanage and as trustee of a mission hospital. She was also on the board of a sanatorium and served as Executive member of The Frank Anthony Public School and Cathedral High School, both in Bangalore.

In 1968, Irani was nominated to the Karnataka Legislative Assembly, where she remained a member till 1978. Between 1993 and 1995, she served on the University of Mysore's senate. In 1995, she was nominated to the 10th Lok Sabha for one of the seats reserved for Anglo-Indians. Irani was the vice president of Anglo-Indian Association.

Sheila Irani also created the Chamundi Children's Home.

== Personal life ==
She married businessman Farrokh K. Irani, one of the founders and CMD of Ideal Jawa India Pvt. Ltd. the makers of the famous Yezdi brand of motorcycles in Mysore. Together they relocated to Mysore, Karnataka in 1951 and had two sons and a daughter. She died on 10 April 2003.
