= Marjorie Godfrey =

Indian politician

Member of the 5th Lok Sabha
- In office 1971–1977

Personal details
- Born: March 29, 1919 Hyderabad, British Raj
- Died: October 27, 2003 (aged 84) Hyderabad, India
- Education: Osmania University

Marjorie Godfrey (29 March 1919 – 27 October 2003) was an Anglo-Indian nominated member of the 5th Lok Sabha and the Andhra Pradesh Legislative Assembly.

== Early life ==
Marjorie was born on 29 March 1919 in Hyderabad, Andhra Pradesh. She received her Bachelor of Arts degree from Osmania University.

== Career ==
Godfrey was an educationist who served for 17 years as the Superintendent-in-Charge of Examinations and Selections. She established The Catholic Association of Hyderabad. She was one of the two Anglo-Indian members nominated to the 5th Lok Sabha in 1971. Prior to this, she had been a nominated member of the Andhra Pradesh Legislative Assembly for four years and a Vice President of the All India Anglo-Indian Association's governing body.

Godfrey also served on the Central Social Welfare Advisory Board and represented Andhra Pradesh at the Inter-State Board for Anglo-Indian Education.

== Personal life ==
On 10 January 1949, Marjorie married Allen Godfrey. They had two children. She died on 27 October 2003, due to cardiac arrest. The Andhra Pradesh Council of Churches and The Catholic Association of Hyderabad offered condolences after her death.

Her daughter Della Godfrey was also a nominated member of the Andhra Pradesh state assembly.
