= Frank Anthony =

Indian politician (1908–1993)

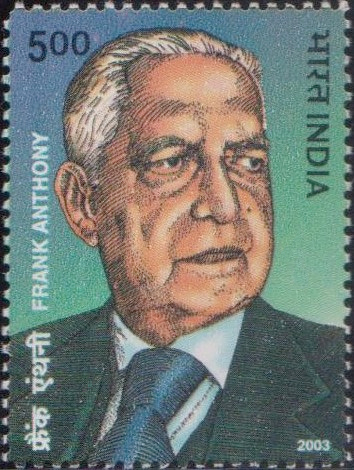
- Anthony on a 2003 post-stamp of India
- Born: 25 September 1908; Jubblepore, Central Provinces and Berar, British India (Present-day Jabalpur, Madhya Pradesh, India)
- Died: 3 December 1993 (aged 85); New Delhi, NCT of Delhi, India
- Education: Nagpur University; Inner Temple, London
- Occupations: Politician; Advocate
- Organization: Council for the Indian School Certificate Examinations

Frank Anthony (25 September 1908 – 3 December 1993) was a leader of the Anglo-Indian and Christian community in India, and was until his death the Anglo-Indian nominated representative in the Parliament of India except during the 6th and 9th Lok Sabha. He served as the president of the All India Anglo-Indian Association.

Frank Anthony was a part of the constituent assembly that wrote the Constitution of India. He was deeply opposed to the partition of India.

Anthony was known for championing Christian education. He was also the founder of the Council for the Indian School Certificate Examinations (CISCE) which operates the ICSE board of Education in India.

== Early life and education ==
Anthony was born in Jubbulpore (now called Jabalpur) on 25 September 1908. Anthony was educated at Christ Church High School and Robertson College in Jabalpur. He studied at Nagpur University, and Inner Temple in London and became a barrister. Louis D'Silva and M. Ezra Sargunam stated that "Frank Anthony had a brilliant academic career" and he was the winner of the Viceroy's All-India Gold Medal for English.

== Role in Constituent Assembly ==
In 1942–46, he was a member of the Central Legislative Assembly, and later a member of the Constituent Assembly of India during 1946–50 and represented the Anglo-Indian community in assembly. He was also temporary vice president of Constituent Assembly and was a part of the Advisory Committee and Sub-committee on Minorities.

== Career ==
In 1942, Anthony was elected the president-in-chief of the community of the All India Anglo-Indian Association. He opposed the partition of India on the grounds that it would jeopardise the interests of the minority communities. He stressed the following:

First, Anthony argued that in the proposed area of Pakistan there would still be a considerable number of non-Muslims, and a large number of Muslims would also remain in India. Hence, he argued, ‘the minorities problem after the division of India would be as acute, perhaps much more acute, in both Pakistan and Hindustan as it is today.’ Secondly, he pointed out that the Muslim League plan would ‘lead to the Balkanising of India,’ potentially ‘emasculating’ India as an ‘international power.’ Anthony’s third argument was that India was unlike Europe and so there was no basis for division as India had achieved ‘a basic ethnic and cultural unity.’ Lastly, Anthony maintained that the division of India would lead to war between the two countries and the ‘propagation of narrow and fanatical economic and political ideologies.

Anthony criticized the pro-separatist All India Muslim League led by Muhammad Ali Jinnah, holding them to be responsible for the murders that occurred during Direct Action Day and for spreading communal hatred:

the hatred was really started by Jinnah, there's no doubt about it. ...The 80% of illiterate people ... the killings in Calcutta ... [were] something indescribable. There we had the largest number of Anglo-Indians, about 30,000, but ... Anglo-Indians were not touched ... My Anglo-Indian Association saved thousands of Hindus. Went into the Muslim localities ... gave them ... food, and ... brought some of them out ... but nobody touched them.

Anthony charged the pro-separatist All India Muslim League with being "born in hatred" and being "responsible for an inevitable cycle of violence." The All India Anglo-Indian Association saved the lives of both Hindus and Muslims during the rioting. When the future of India was being decided by British, Hindu and Muslim leaders, he presented the Anglo-Indian case to Mahatma Gandhi, Sardar Vallabhbhai Patel and Jawaharlal Nehru, and they agreed to make special provisions for the Anglo-Indians in the Indian Constitution. In particular, two seats were reserved for members of the Anglo-Indian community in the Lok Sabha (Lower House) of the Indian parliament, the only reserved seats in the House (these seats were abolished in 2020 by the 104th Amendment of the Constitution of India). Frank Anthony championed the right of converts to Christianity to raise their children in the Christian religion. Anthony was a member of the Provisional Parliament during 1950–52. He was nominated to all Lok Sabhas from the 1st to the 10th, except for the 6th and 9th Lok Sabha.

After Anthony retired from practising as a lawyer, Nehru in 1952 asked him to go to Peshawar to defend Mehr Chand Khanna, the ex-finance minister of the North-West Frontier Province. In those days, no Hindu lawyer would go to Peshawar. Following Anthony's discussions with the chief minister, Khanna was released. In October 1946, he was one of India's delegates at the United Nations. In 1948 and 1957, he represented India at the Commonwealth Parliamentary Conference. In 1978, Anthony assisted the Nehru family when Indira Gandhi was arrested.

Anthony's greatest contribution was in the field of Anglo-Indian and Christian education. In 1947, he was elected chairman of the Inter-State Board of Anglo-Indian Education. He was also the Founder-Chairman of the All India Anglo-Indian Educational Trust which, today, owns and administers six schools named after him, including The Frank Anthony Public School, New Delhi, The Frank Anthony Public School, Bengaluru, The Frank Anthony Public School, Kolkata and three Frank Anthony Junior Schools in the cities of Bangalore, Kolkata and Delhi. These schools took as inspiration the model of the long-established English public school. In the words of Alan Basil de Lastic, the former Archbishop of Delhi, Frank Anthony "always stood for the Christian right to education".

Anthony was also the chairman of the ICSE Council. He was a member of the Church of North India, a United Protestant denomination of Christianity.

== Death ==
Frank Anthony died on 2 December 1993 of cardiac arrest. On 3 December 1993, the Indian Parliament adjourned after mourning his death. His funeral liturgy was presided over by Pritam Santram, a bishop of the Church of North India; Alan Basil de Lastic, the Roman Catholic Archbishop of Delhi was present, along with other Christian clergy.

== See also ==
- The Frank Anthony Memorial All-India Inter-School Debate
- All India Anglo-Indian Association
