= A. E. T. Barrow =

Indian politician

Albert Ernest Thomas Barrow (1 March 1908, Allahabad — 7 March 1990) was an Indian politician and nominated Anglo-Indian member of the Lok Sabha from 1951 to 1971 and again from 1977 to 1989. He studied at the Colvin School and Boys' High School, Allahabad and later at Chelmsford Training College at Ghora Gali of Murree Hills and at Trinity College Dublin in Ireland.

Barrow was married to Doris Muriel Walker (1906–1989), a school teacher. They had one son, Trevor Albert Charles Barrow (born 1935).
