= Pothanur =

- town
- Location in Tamil Nadu, India
- Coordinates: 11.1167°N 77.9833°E
- Country: India
- State: Tamil Nadu
- District: Namakkal

Population (2001)
  - Total: 13,967

Languages
  - Official: Tamil
- Time zone: UTC+5:30 (IST)

Pothanur is a panchayat town in Namakkal district in the Indian state of Tamil Nadu. It is almost a twin town of Velur, the biggest town in Paramathi-Velur taluk since too close to it.

== Demographics ==
As of 2001 India census, Pothanur had a population of 13,967. Males constitute 51% of the population and females 49%. Pothanur has an average literacy rate of 70%, higher than the national average of 59.5%: male literacy is 78%, and female literacy is 62%. In Pothanur, 9% of the population is under 6 years of age.

== Education ==
Pothanur having one Government Higher Secondary School, two elementary school, one middle school and one college i.e., Kandaswami kandar'college affiliated to Periyar University.
