= All India Anglo-Indian Association =

Anglo-Indian organisation

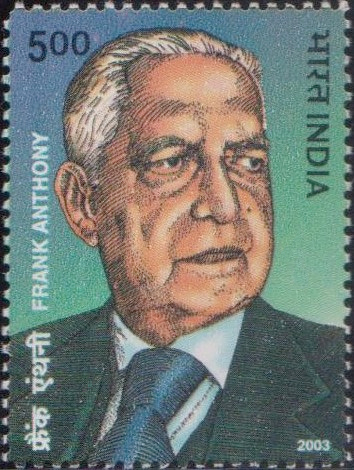
Frank Anthony served as the president of the All India Anglo-Indian Association, securing the presence of Article 331 in the Constitution of India.

The All India Anglo-Indian Association (AIAIA) is an organisation representing the interests of Anglo-Indians. It was founded in 1926 under the British Raj by Sir Henry Gidney. It has sixty-two branches throughout India.

The All India Anglo-Indian Association holds that Anglo-Indians are unique in that they are Christians, speak English as their mother tongue, as well as have a historical link to both Europe and India. During the era of the British Raj in India, the then president of the All-India Anglo-Indian Association represented the Anglo-Indian community of undivided India at the Round Table Conferences. At the time of the Indian independence movement, the All-India Anglo-Indian Association opposed the partition of India; its then president Frank Anthony "fought for the best interests of his community as Indians, not Britishers," criticizing the British for "racial discrimination in matters of pay and allowances, and for failing to acknowledge the sterling military and civil contributions made by Anglo-Indians to the Raj". Anthony criticized the pro-separatist All India Muslim League led by Muhammad Ali Jinnah, holding them to be responsible for the murderers that occurred during Direct Action Day and for spreading communal hatred. The All India Anglo-Indian Association saved the lives of both Hindus and Muslims during the rioting. In September 1942, at the organisation's annual general meeting, the All India Anglo-Indian Association affirmed its love for and loyalty to India. The organisation's efforts under the presidency of Anthony led to Article 331 being included in the Constitution of India: "Notwithstanding anything in Article 170, the Governor of a State may, if he is of opinion that the Anglo-Indian community needs representation in the Legislative Assembly of the State and is not adequately represented therein, [nominate one member of that community to the Assembly]."

The various branches of the All India Anglo-Indian Association arrange events throughout the year. This includes celebrations of Christian holidays such as Christmas, as well as sporting events with an annual hockey tournament being at the epicentre.

== See also ==
- All India Conference of Indian Christians
- Composite nationalism
