= Hedwig Rego =

Hedwig William Rego (16 October 1937 – 30 July 2024) was an Indian teacher, social activist and a former nominated Anglo-Indian member of the 11th Lok Sabha (1997).

== Early life ==
Hedwig was born on 16 October 1937, to William Anthony Michael of Hyderabad, Andhra Pradesh. She received her education from Shivaji University of Kolhapur and Annamalai University, Chennai and holds Master of Arts and Bachelor of Education degrees.

== Career ==
From 1977 to 1997, Rego was a senior teacher at The Frank Anthony Public School, Bangalore. In 1997, she was nominated to the Lok Sabha, lower house of the Indian parliament, for one of the two seats reserved for Anglo-Indians. As a Lok Sabha member she raised issues related to the Anglo-Indian community.

Rego has served on the Minorities Commission of Karnataka state. She is also involved with Anglo-Indian institutions like Archdiocesan Board of Education, Bangalore and Anglo-Indian Guild.

== Personal life and death ==
She married Denzil Rego on 3 June 1963. Together they have two daughters and three sons and live in Bangalore. Rego is a breast cancer survivor and has been a counsellor for a cancer awareness program in her city.

Rego died on 30 July 2024, at the age of 86.
