= Member of Parliament, Lok Sabha =

Member of the lower house of the Indian Parliament

- Logo of The Lok Sabha

- Flag of India

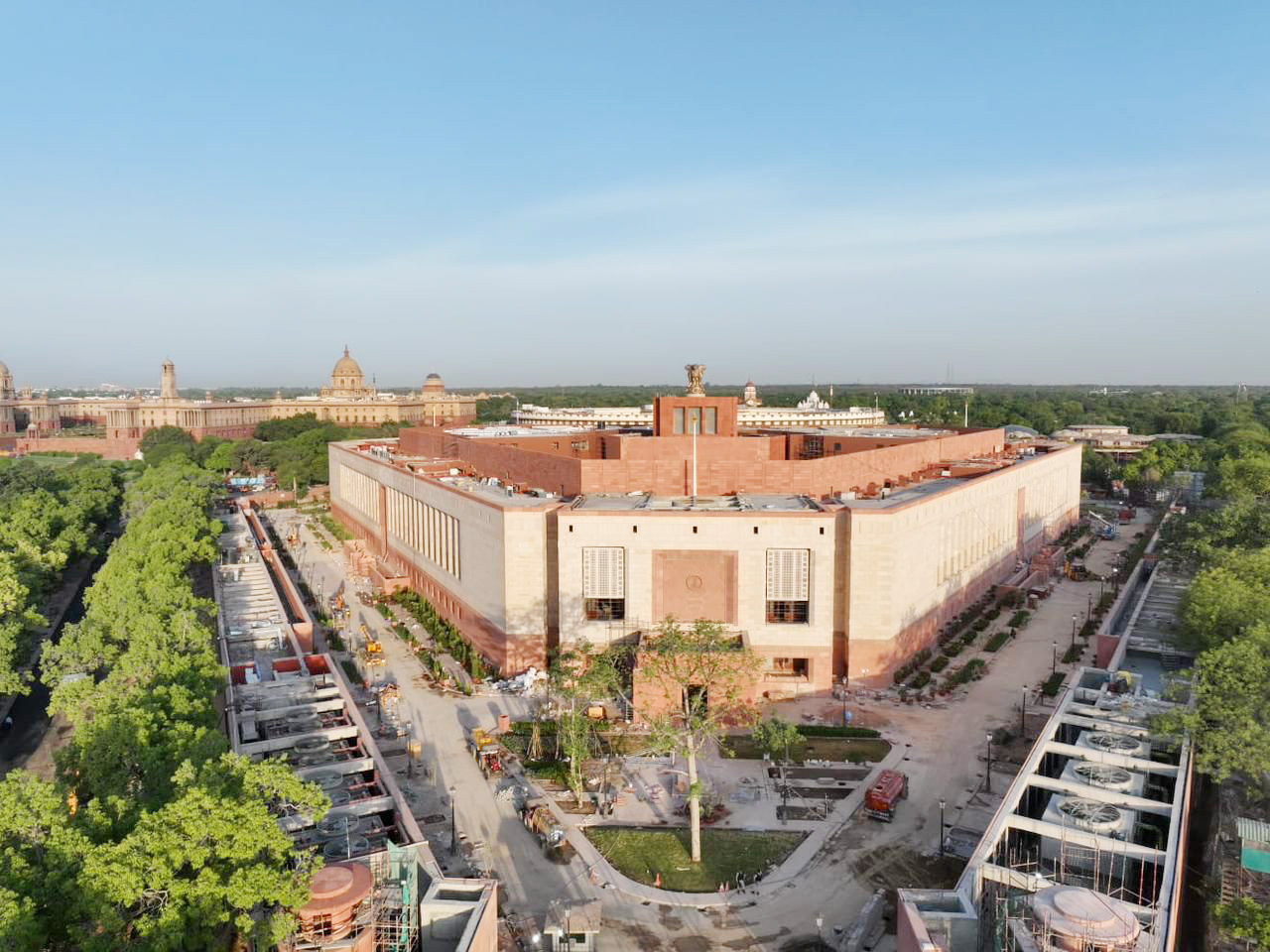
- Incumbent; 18th Lok Sabha since 24 June 2024
- Parliament of India
- Style: Honourable (Inside India); His/Her Excellency (Outside India)
- Type: Member of Parliament
- Status: Active
- Abbreviation: MP
- Member of: Lok Sabha
- Reports to: Speaker of the Lok Sabha
- Seat: Parliament of India
- Appointer: Elect by Citizens of respective Constituencies in India
- Term length: 5 years; renewable
- Constituting instrument: Article 81 of Constitution of India
- Precursor: Constituent Assembly of India
- Formation: 26 January 1950 (76 years ago)
- First holder: 1st Lok Sabha
- Salary: ₹124,000 (US$1,300) (incl. allowances) per month
- Website: sansad.in/ls

A Member of Parliament in the Lok Sabha is one of the elected legislators that represent the constituencies and states and up to 20 members to represent the union territories of the Republic of India (both chosen by direct elections).

Between 1952 and January 25, 2020, two seats were reserved for members of the Anglo-Indian community. The current elected strength of the Lok Sabha is 543. The party—or coalition of parties—having a majority in the Lok Sabha chooses the Prime Minister of India.

All Members of Lok Sabha rank 21st in the Order of Precedence of India.

== History ==
The first instance of member of parliament equivalent in India dates back to 9 December 1946, the day Constituent Assembly of India was formed with the purpose of drafting a constitution for India. As opposed to be elected on the basis of adult suffrage, the Constituent Assembly of India consisted of indirectly elected representatives and were not categorised between Rajya Sabha and Lok Sabha. Muslims and Sikhs were given special representation as minorities. The Constituent Assembly of India took 2 years, 11 months and 18 days to draft the constitution for independent India and was dissolved in 1949.

On 26 January 1950, the Indian constitution came into force and the first general elections (under the new constitution) were held in 1951–1952. The 1st Lok Sabha was constituted on 17 April 1952 and had 489 constituencies, thereby first set of elected members of parliament of Lok Sabha in India.

== Eligibility criteria ==
According to the article 84 of the Indian Constitution:

A person shall not be qualified to be chosen to fill a seat in Parliament unless he -

(a) is a citizen of India, and makes and subscribes before some person authorised in that behalf by the Election Commission an oath or affirmation according to the form set out for the purpose in the Third Schedule;

(b) is, in the case of a seat in the Council of States, not less than thirty years of age and, in the case of a seat in the House of the People, not less than twenty-five years of age; and

(c) possesses such other qualifications as may be prescribed in that behalf by or under any law made by Parliament.

== Disqualification grounds ==
A person would be ineligible for being a Member of the Lok Sabha if the person;

- Holds any office of profit under the Government of India (other than an office permitted by Parliament of India by law).
- Is of unsound mind.
- Is an insolvent.
- Has ceased to be a citizen of India.
- Is so disqualified by any law made by the Indian parliament.
- Is so disqualified on the ground of defection.
- Has been convicted, among other things, for promoting enmity between different groups.
- Has been convicted for offence of bribery.
- Has been punished for preaching and practising social crimes such as untouchability, dowry, or sati.
- Has been convicted for an offence and sentenced to imprisonment of more than two years.
- Has been dismissed for corruption or for disloyalty to the state (in case of a government servant).

== Term ==
The term of a member of parliament of Lok Sabha is five years from the date appointment for its first meeting. During a state of emergency, the term however can be extended by the Parliament of India by law for a period not exceeding one year at a time. After the state of emergency ends, the extension cannot exceed beyond a period of six months.

== Responsibilities of members of parliament ==
Broad responsibilities of the members of parliament of Lok Sabha are;

- Legislative responsibility: To pass Laws of India in the Lok Sabha.
- Oversight responsibility: To ensure that the executive (i.e. government) performs its duties satisfactorily.
- Representative responsibility: To represent the views and aspirations of the people of their constituency in the Parliament of India (Lok Sabha).
- Power of the purse responsibility: To approve and oversee the revenues and expenditures proposed by the government.
- The Union Council of Ministers, who are also members of parliament have an additional responsibility of the executive as compared to those who are not in the Council of Ministers.

== Salary, allowances and entitlements ==
India paid ₹176 crore (equivalent to ₹290 crore or US$30 million in 2026) to its 543 Lok Sabha members in salaries and expenses over 2015, or just over ₹2.7 lakh (equivalent to ₹4.4 lakh or US$4,600 in 2026) per month per member of parliament in including pensions to dependents of ex MPs . The Salary, allowances and pension of Member of the Lok Sabha is governed by the Members of Parliament Act, 1954. The act is in pursuance to the constitutional provisions where article 106 of the Constitution of India provides that the members of either House of Parliament shall be entitled to receive such salaries and allowances as may from time to time be determined by Parliament by law.

The rules governing salaries, allowances and facilities such as medical, housing, telephone facilities, daily allowance etc... is looked after by a joint committee of both the houses (Lok Sabha and the Rajya Sabha). The committee is constituted from time to time after consultation with the Government of India.

== Strength ==
The map of 543 Lok Sabha constituencies in which elections are conducted for the current 18th Lok Sabha

Article 81 of the Constitution of India 1949 has specified maximum strength of members of parliament in the Lok Sabha to be 552. The number of members of parliament is distributed among the States in such a way that the ratio between the number of seats allotted to each State and the population of the State is, so far as practicable, the same for all States. Out of the maximum permitted strength,

- Not more than 530 members to be chosen by direct election from territorial constituencies in the Indian states.
- Not more than 20 members to represent the union territories, chosen in such manner as Parliament of India may by law provide.
- Total permitted maximum strength of 550 members.

"Strength of Member of Parliament in Lok Sabha as defined in Article 81 of the Constitution of India",

(1) Subject to the provisions of article 331, the House of the People shall consist of

(a) not more than 530 (five hundred and thirty members) chosen by direct election from territorial constituencies in the States, and
(b) not more than 20 (twenty members) to represent the Union territories, chosen in such manner as Parliament may by law provide.

(2) For the purposes of sub-clause (a) of clause (1),

(a) there shall be allotted to each State a number of seats in the House of the People in such manner that the ratio between that number and the population of the State is, so far as practicable, the same for all States; and
(b) each State shall be divided into territorial constituencies in such manner that the ratio between the population of each constituency and the number of seats allotted to it is, so far as practicable, the same throughout the State:
(Provided that the provisions of sub-clause (a) of this clause shall not be applicable for the purpose of allotment of seats in the House of the People to any State so long as the population of that State does not exceed six millions.)

(3) In this article, the expression "population" means the population as ascertained at the last preceding census of which the relevant figures have been published:
(Provided that the reference in this clause to the last preceding census of which the relevant figures have been published shall, until the relevant figures for the first census taken after the year 2026 have been published).

(i) for the purposes of sub-clause (a) of clause (2) and the proviso to that clause, as a reference to the 1971 census; and
(ii) for the purposes of sub-clause (b) of clause (2) as a reference to the 2001 census.

— Ministry of Law and Justice, Constitution of India (Part V—The Union.—Article 81.)

=== Members of the Lok Sabha ===
Members of the lower house of the Indian Parliament (Lok Sabha) were elected in the Indian general election, 2024 held in April–June 2024. The total strength of the 18th Lok Sabha is 544, against the then-approved strength of 552.

=== Number of constituencies: 1951–2024 ===
The following is a list of the number of constituencies in the Lok Sabha in each election year, beginning in 1951. The numbers do not include two seats from the Anglo-Indian community, to which individuals were nominated by the President of India.

#	Lok Sabha	Date	Constituencies
1	1st Lok Sabha	Apr 1951	489
2	2nd Lok Sabha	Apr 1957	494
3	3rd Lok Sabha	Apr 1962	494
4	4th Lok Sabha	Mar 1967	520
5	5th Lok Sabha	Mar 1971	518
6	6th Lok Sabha	Mar 1977	542
7	7th Lok Sabha	Jan 1980	542
8	8th Lok Sabha	Dec 1984	541
9	9th Lok Sabha	Dec 1989	529
10	10th Lok Sabha	Jun 1991	534
11	11th Lok Sabha	May 1996	543
12	12th Lok Sabha	Mar 1998	543
13	13th Lok Sabha	Oct 1999	543
14	14th Lok Sabha	May 2004	543
15	15th Lok Sabha	May 2009	543
16	16th Lok Sabha	May 2014	543
17	17th Lok Sabha	May 2019	543
18	18th Lok Sabha	June 2024	543

=== Anglo-Indian reservation ===
In January 2020, the Anglo-Indian reserved seats in the Parliament and State Legislatures of India was discontinued by the 126th Constitutional Amendment Bill of 2019, when enacted as 104th Constitutional Amendment Act, 2019. As a result, the maximum permitted strength of the Lok Sabha was reduced from 552 to 550.

== See also ==
- List of members of the 18th Lok Sabha
- Constitution of India
- Parliament of India
