= One Hundred and Fourth Amendment of the Constitution of India =

Constitutional amendment of 2019

The Constitution (One Hundred and Fourth Amendment) Act, 2019

Parliament of India
- Long title: An Act further to amend the Constitution of India.
- Citation: 104th Amendment Act of the Indian Constitution
- Territorial extent: India
- Passed by: Lok Sabha
- Passed: 10 December 2019
- Passed by: Rajya Sabha
- Passed: 12 December 2019
- Assented to: 21 January 2020
- Commenced: 25 January 2020

Legislative history

Initiating chamber: Lok Sabha
- Bill title: The Constitution (One Hundred and twenty six Amendment) Bill, 2019
- Bill citation: Bill No. 371 of 2019
- Introduced by: Ravi Shankar Prasad
- Introduced: 4 December 2019
- Status: In force

The One Hundred and Fourth Amendment of the Constitution of India, extends the deadline for the cessation of the reservation of seats for members from Scheduled Castes and Scheduled Tribes in the Lok Sabha and State Legislative Assemblies by a period of 10 years.

The reservation of seats for the Scheduled Castes and Scheduled Tribes was set to expire on 26 January 2020 as mandated by the Ninety Fifth Amendment but was extended for another 10 years with the given reason:

Although the Scheduled Castes and the Scheduled Tribes have made considerable progress in the last 70 years, the reasons which weighed with the Constituent Assembly in making provisions with regard to the aforesaid reservation of seats have not yet ceased to exist. Therefore, with a view to retaining the inclusive character as envisioned by the founding fathers of the Constitution, it is proposed to continue the reservation of seats for the Scheduled Castes and the Scheduled Tribes for another ten years i.e. up to 25th January, 2030 -Ravi Shankar Prasad, Minister of Law and Justice

The amendment does not, however, extend the period of reservation of the 2 Lok Sabha seats and seats in State Legislative Assemblies reserved for members of the Anglo-Indian Community and thus the practice of nominating two members of the Anglo-Indian community by the President of India under the recommendation of the Prime Minister of India was effectively abolished.

== Text ==
BE it enacted by Parliament in the Seventieth Year of the Republic of India as follows:—

1. (1) This Act may be called the Constitution (One Hundred and Fourth Amendment) Act, 2019.

(2) It shall come into force on the 25th day of January, 2020.

2. In article 334 of the Constitution,—

(a) for the marginal heading, the following marginal heading shall be substituted, namely:—

“Reservation of seats and special representation to cease after certain period”;

(b) in the long line, after clauses (a) and (b), for the words "seventy years", the words "eighty years in respect of clause (a) and seventy years in respect of clause (b)" shall be substituted.

The full text of Article 334 of the Constitution, after the 95th Amendment, is given below:

368. ~~Reservation of seats and special representation to cease after ten years.~~ Reservation of seats and special representation to cease after certain period.

Notwithstanding anything in the foregoing provisions of this Part [Part XVI], the provisions of this Constitution relating to—

(a) the reservation of seats for the Scheduled Castes and the Scheduled Tribes in the House of the People and in the Legislative Assemblies of the States; and
(b) the representation of the Anglo Indian community in the House of the People and in the Legislative Assemblies of the States by nomination,
shall cease to have effect on the expiration of a period of ~~seventy years~~ eighty years in respect of clause (a) and seventy years in respect of clause (b) from the commencement of this Constitution: Provided that nothing in this article shall affect any representation in the House of the People or in the legislative Assembly of a State until the dissolution of the then existing House or Assembly, as the case may be.

== Legislative history ==
The Constitution (One Hundred and Fourth Amendment) Bill, 2019 was introduced in the Lok Sabha on 9 December 2019 by Ravi Shankar Prasad, Minister of Law and Justice. The bill sought to amend Article 334 of the constitution.

The bill was unanimously passed by the Lok Sabha on 10 December 2019 with 355 votes in favour and 0 votes against. The bill was then tabled in the Rajya Sabha and was also passed unanimously on 12 December 2019 with 163 votes in favour and 0 votes against. The bill received assent from the President of India, Ram Nath Kovind, on 21 January 2020 and was notified in The Gazette of India on the next day. The amendment came into effect on 25 January 2020.

== See also ==
- 103rd Constitutional Amendment
- 102nd Constitutional Amendment
- Constitution of India
