= Anglo-Indian people =

Ethnic group or cultural group identification

Anglo-Indians
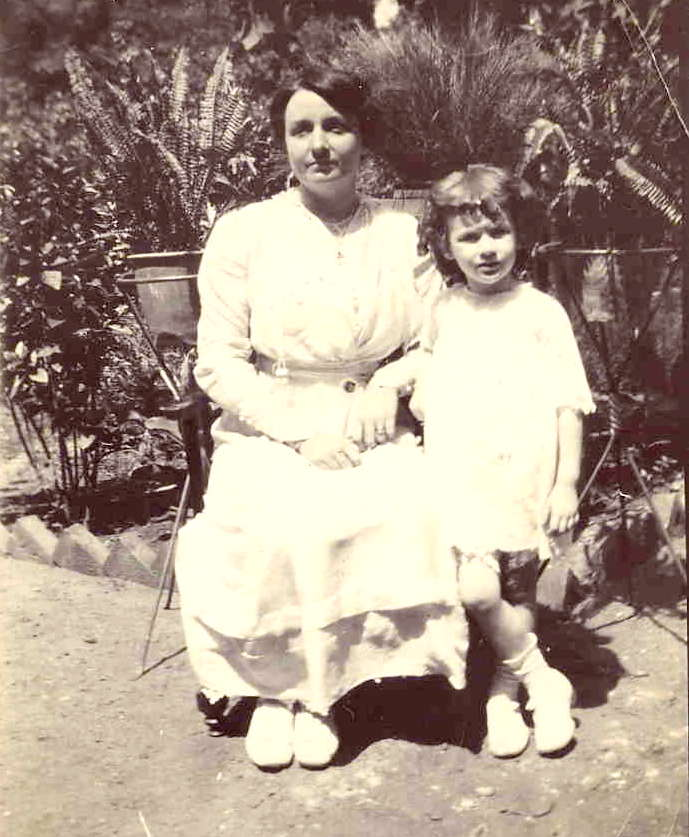
- Anglo-Indian lady and girl in c. 1920 (British Raj era)

Total population
- 500,000

Regions with significant populations
- India: 300,000-400,000 (1996); 125,000-150,000 (2023)
- United Kingdom: 86,000
- Australia: 22,000
- Canada: 22,000
- United States: 20,000
- Myanmar: 19,200
- New Zealand: 15,861
- Malaysia: 10,310
- Singapore: 4,800
- Bangladesh: 2,100
- Pakistan: <1,500

Languages
- English (British · Indian); Hindustani (Hindi · Urdu); Many other Indian languages

Religion
- Majority: Christianity (Protestant · Catholic)

Related ethnic groups
- Anglo-Burmese, Scottish-Indians, Irish Indians, Burghers, Kristang people, Indo people, Singaporean Eurasians, Macanese people, Indo-Aryan people, Dravidian people, British people, Indian diaspora

Anglo-Indian people are a distinct Indian minority community of both British and Indian ancestry. During the colonial period their ancestry was defined by British paternal and Indian maternal heritage; in the period subsequent to the British Raj, the term Anglo-Indian has also encompassed other European and Indian ancestries. Anglo-Indians' first language is English. In the nineteenth century, various designations such as Eurasian or Indo-Briton were used to describe this community, while Anglo-Indian was primarily used for white Britons in India. Since 1911, Anglo-Indian has been used primarily for mixed race individuals with paternal British and Indian maternal ancestry while white Britons living in India were classed separately as European.

The All India Anglo-Indian Association, founded in 1926, has long represented the interests of this ethnic group; it holds that Anglo-Indians are unique in that they are Christians, speak English as their mother tongue, and have a historical link to both the British Isles and the Indian sub-continent.

Starting with the arrival of the East India Company, people of mixed British and Indian descent originated from children born to unions between British fathers and Indian mothers from the 17th century onwards. This new ethnic group formed a small yet significant portion of the population and became well represented in certain administrative roles. Anglo-Indians were mostly isolated and faced discrimination both British and Indian society, and over time formed a distinct group. Their documented numbers dwindled from roughly 300,000 at the time of independence in 1947 to about 125,000–150,000 in modern-day India due to emigration as well as assimilation. During much of the time that Britain ruled India, British-Indian relationships faced stigma, which meant that the ethnicity of some Anglo-Indians was undocumented or identified incorrectly. As such, many have adapted to local communities in India or emigrated to the United Kingdom, Australia, Canada, the United States, South Africa and New Zealand.

Similar communities can also be seen in other parts of the world, although in smaller numbers, such as Anglo-Burmese in Myanmar and Burghers in Sri Lanka.

== Demographics ==
Anglo-Indian Population in India from 1951 to 2011
Year	Population
1951	▼296,364
1961	▼227,267
1971	▼173,128
1981	▼145,340
1991	▼106,270
2001	▼78,512
2011	▼56,394

The population of the Anglo-Indian community has decreased due to emigration to the west or integration into the broader Indian community. In 2023, Clive Van Buerle of the All-India Anglo-Indian Association governing body estimated, based on membership, that there were approximately 350,000–400,000 Anglo-Indians in India.

== History ==
The first use of "Anglo-Indian" was to describe all Britons who lived in India. People of mixed British and Indian descent were referred to as "Eurasians". "Anglo-Indians" now primarily refer to the latter group. The community originated soon after 1639 when the British East India Company established a settlement in Madras. The community identified itself with and was accepted by the British until 1791, when Anglo-Indians were excluded from positions of authority in the civil, military and marine services in the East India Company. During the Indian rebellion of 1857, Anglo-Indians were employed in large numbers in the strategic services of the railways, the postal and telegraph services, and customs. In 1919, the Anglo-Indian community was given one reserved seat in the Central Legislative Assembly in Delhi.

=== Creation ===
During the East India Company's rule in India in the late 18th and early 19th centuries, it was common for British officers and soldiers to take local wives and start families, owing to an initial lack of British women in India. Looking at the records of wills from the early 1780s, a third of all British men in India named their Indian wives and children as their inheritors. By the mid-19th century, there were around 40,000 British soldiers, but fewer than 2,000 British officials were present in India. By then, the Suez Canal was opened and many British women came to India in quick transit.

Before the British Raj, the Company, with some reluctance, endorsed a policy of local marriage for its soldiers. The board of directors wrote in 1688 to its Council at Fort St. George: "Induce by all meanes you can invent our Souldiers (sic) to marry with the Native women, because it will be impossible to get ordinary young women, as we have before directed, to pay their own passages, although Gentlewomen sufficient do offer themselves." Until 1741, a special payment was made to each soldier who had his child baptised as a Protestant. The concern in London was that if the soldiers at Fort St. George lived with or married the many Portuguese women there the children would be brought up as Roman Catholics rather than Protestants. The Company's officials on the ground were less worried about the religious issue, but more concerned that soldiers should be married "to prevent wickedness". Married soldiers with family ties were thought more likely to be better behaved than bachelors.

The British military population in India grew rapidly from a few hundred soldiers in the mid-18th century to 18,000 in the Royal and Company armies of 1790, though this figure includes native Indian sepoys, who made up the vast majority of the military during the company rule and crown rule in India. During this time the records of cohabitation and last testaments show that at least a third of all British men in India married an Indian woman or left their inheritance to their Anglo-Indian children. There were also many second generation British officers who were born and raised in India, such as Lieutenant-Colonel James Kirkpatrick who was born in Madras in 1764, wore Mughal style clothing, and spoke Tamil as a first language. Left with a strong affinity for the cultural practices of their childhood homeland, many although nominally Christian would adopt local Hindu and Muslim customs such as shunning pork, beef, and even becoming vegetarians. Kirkpatrick would even go on to converting to Islam in order to marry a Sayyida noblewoman named Khair-un-Nissa in 1800, having two children together, and assimilating into the Hyderabadi elite. Other officials such as William Fraser would similarly assimilate themselves into local Indian culture, even patronizing artists and poets such as Ghalib, and going on to have dozens of children with many women, both Hindu and Muslim. Notable children of these unions such as James Skinner, also named Sikandar Sahib, the son of a Scottish Company officer and an Indian noblewoman of the Bhojpur region, would go on to serve prominent roles in the Maratha Army and later Bengal Army where he raised his own regiment called Skinner's Horse.

Many children were born to unofficial partnerships: 54% of the children baptised at St. John's, Calcutta between 1767 and 1782 were Anglo-Indian and illegitimate. British women of good social standing were scarce; in 1785 surgeon John Stewart wrote to his brother from Cawnpore: "Many of the women here are mere adventuresses from Milliners shops on Ludgate Hill and some even from Covent Garden and Old Drury [well known areas of prostitution in late 18th century London]. They possess neither sentiment nor education, and are so intoxicated by their sudden elevation, that a sensible man can only regard them with indignation and outrage."

The reforming zeal of Governor-General Lord Cornwallis had ensured that by the 1780s, the opportunities for Company servants to make a fortune through trade had gone forever. Most had to live on their Company salaries and few could afford to support a wife. Company officers were paid less than their counterparts in the British Army and promotion might take twice as long, perhaps 25 years to reach the rank of Major in the Company compared to between 12 and 17 years in the Royal Army; and in the Bengal Army in 1784, there were only four Colonels amongst 931 officers. Few young officers in either army managed to avoid debt. It might have cost approximately £50 a year (Rs 24 to Rs 40 a month) to provide for the wants of an Indian companion and her attendants, compared with £600 to support a British wife with any degree of public style. 83 of 217 wills in Bengal between 1780 and 1785 contained bequests either to Indian companions or their natural children, who were the offspring of high and low in British society, and gentlemen of wealth often left substantial bequests and annuities to their Indian partners and children. When Major Thomas Naylor in 1782 bequeathed to his companion Muckmul Patna Rs 4000, a bungalow and a garden at Berhampore, a hackery, bullocks, her jewels, clothes, and all their male and female slaves, he treated her as he might a wife. Where they could, gentlemen sent their Anglo-Indian daughters to the ladies' seminaries in Presidency towns and to England to be 'finished'; and when they returned, they were married off to fellow officers. Some daughters of senior officers became substantial heiresses whose wealth was a marked marital attraction, but many more daughters of impoverished officers, raised in military orphanages after the deaths of their fathers, hoped only to find a suitable husband at the monthly public dances. Save in very few cases, when British men returned home, the Indian companion and any children stayed in India: British soldiers were not permitted to bring them, and many officers and civil servants feared the social and cultural consequences.

=== Neglect ===
Originally, under Regulation VIII of 1813, Anglo-Indians were excluded from the British legal system and in Bengal became subject to the rule of Islamic law outside Calcutta, and yet found themselves without any caste or status amongst those who were to judge them. This coincided with the Company officially allowing Christian missionaries into India; and evangelical organisations and popular writers of the time like Mary Sherwood routinely blamed the alleged moral shortcomings or personality defects of the growing Anglo-Indian population upon the Indian mother rather than the European father. There was growing disapproval of marriages amongst the Company elite and Anglo-Indian women. The public dances for the female wards of the Upper Military Academy, Calcutta, which had been attended so eagerly fifty years earlier had been discontinued by the 1830s. Public argument against marriages to Indian and Anglo-Indian women skirted the question of race and focused on their social consequences: they did not mix well in British society, lacked education, were reluctant to leave India when their men retired, and - probably most important of all - would handicap the career of an ambitious husband. By 1830, the proportion of illegitimate births registered in the Bengal Presidency had fallen to 10%, and British wills in Bengal in 1830-2 record less than one in four bequests to Indian women and their children compared with almost two in five fifty years earlier. For all the social disapproval, however, officers and Company servants continued to marry Anglo-Indian girls, and it was thought that in Calcutta alone there were more than 500 marriageable Anglo-Indian girls in the 1820s, compared to 250 Englishwomen in the whole of Bengal.

In 1821, a pamphlet entitled "Thoughts on how to better the condition of Indo-Britons" by a "Practical Reformer", was written to promote the removal of prejudices existing in the minds of young Eurasians against engaging in trades. This was followed up by another pamphlet, entitled "An Appeal on behalf of Indo-Britons". Prominent Eurasians in Calcutta formed the "East Indian Committee" with a view to send a petition to the British parliament for the redress of their grievances. John William Ricketts, a pioneer in the Eurasian cause, volunteered to proceed to England. His mission was successful, and on his return to India, by way of Madras, he received a standing ovation from his countrymen in that presidency; and was afterwards warmly welcomed in Calcutta, where a report of his mission was read at a public meeting held in the Calcutta Town Hall. In April 1834, in obedience to an Act of Parliament passed in August 1833, the Indian government was forced to grant government jobs to Anglo-Indians.

As British women began arriving in India in large numbers around the early to mid-19th century, mostly as family members of officers and soldiers, British men became less likely to marry Indian women. Intermarriage declined after the events of the Rebellion of 1857, after which several anti-miscegenation laws were implemented. As a result, Eurasians were neglected by both the British and Indian populations in India.

=== Consolidation ===
Over generations, Anglo-Indians intermarried with other Anglo-Indians to form a community that developed a culture of its own. Their cuisine, dress, speech (use of English as their mother tongue), and religion (Christianity) all served to further separate them from the native population. A number of factors fostered a strong sense of community among Anglo-Indians. Their English language school system, their strongly Anglo-influenced culture, and their Christian beliefs in particular helped bind them together.

They formed social clubs and associations to run functions, including regular dances on occasions such as Christmas and Easter. Indeed, their Christmas balls, held in most major cities, still form a distinctive part of Indian Christian culture.

Over time Anglo-Indians were specifically recruited into the Customs and Excise, Post and Telegraphs, Forestry Department, the railways and teaching professions – but they were employed in many other fields as well.

The Anglo-Indian community also had a role as go-betweens in the introduction of Western musical styles, harmonies and instruments in post-Independence India. During the colonial era, genres including ragtime and jazz were played by bands for the social elites, and these bands often contained Anglo-Indian members.

=== Independence and choices ===
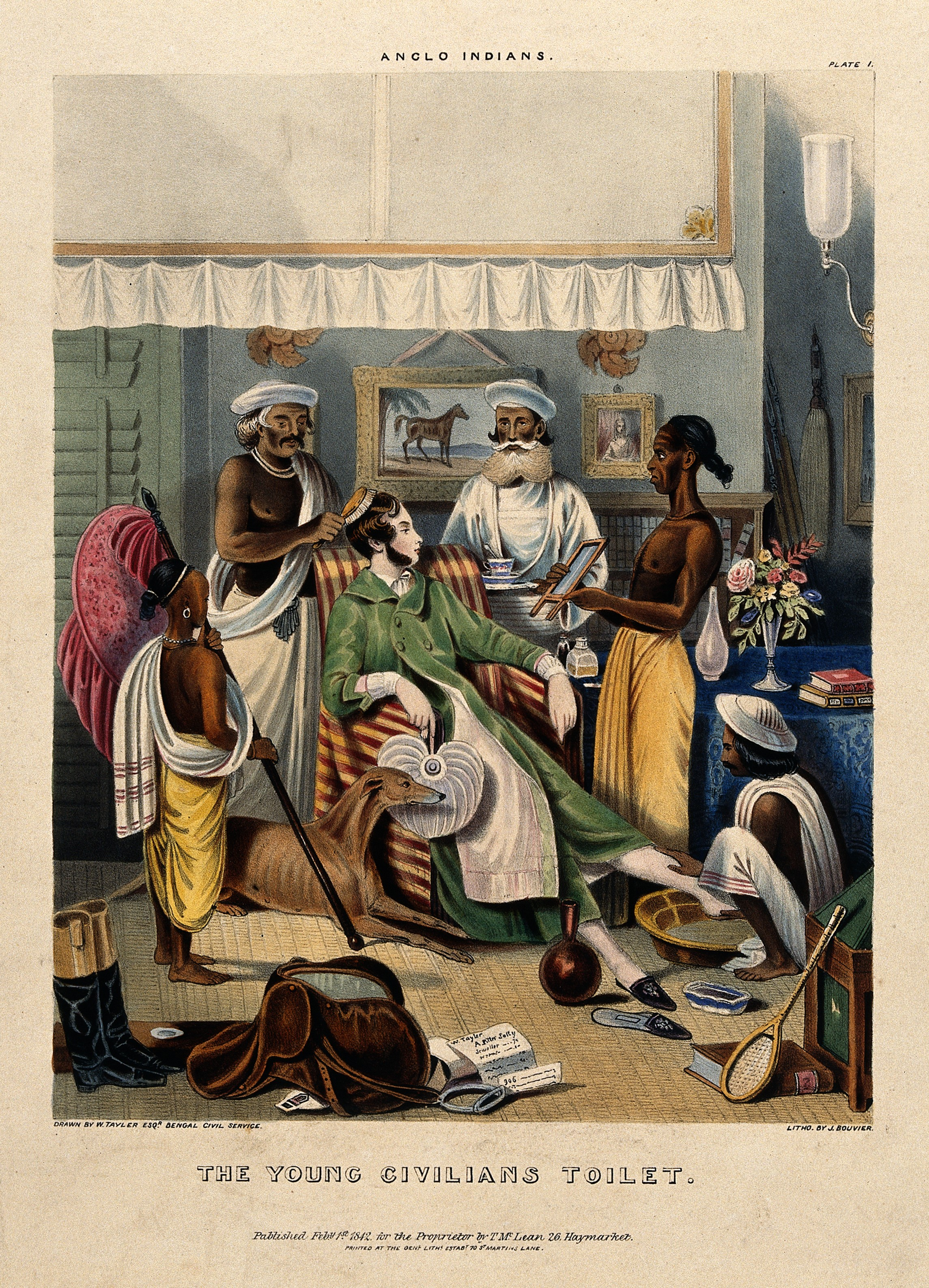
A male Anglo-Indian being washed, dressed and attended.

Around the time of the Indian independence movement, the All-India Anglo-Indian Association was opposed to the partition of India; its then president Frank Anthony criticized the colonial authorities for "racial discrimination in matters of pay and allowances, and for failing to acknowledge the sterling military and civil contributions made by Anglo-Indians to the Raj".

Their position at the time of independence of India was difficult. Given their English ancestry, many felt a loyalty to a British "home" that most had never seen and where they would gain little social acceptance. Bhowani Junction touches on the identity crisis faced by the Anglo-Indian community during the independence movement of the 20th century. They felt insecure in an India that put a premium on participation in the independence movement as a prerequisite for important government positions.

Many Anglo-Indians left the country in 1947, hoping to make a new life in the United Kingdom or elsewhere in the British Commonwealth, such as Australia or Canada. The exodus continued through the 1950s and 1960s and by the late 1990s most had left with many of the remaining Anglo-Indians still aspiring to leave.

Like the Parsi community, the Anglo-Indians were essentially urban dwellers. Unlike the Parsis, the mass migrations saw more of the better-educated and financially secure Anglo-Indians depart for other Commonwealth nations.

=== 21st century cultural resurgence ===
There has been a resurgence in the celebration of Anglo-Indian culture in the twenty-first century, in the form of International Anglo-Indian Reunions and in publishing books. There have been nine reunions, with the latest being held in 2015 in Kolkata.

Several narratives and novels have been published recently. The Leopard's Call: An Anglo-Indian Love Story (2005) by Reginald Shires, tells of the life of two teachers at the small Bengali town of Falakata, down from Bhutan; At the Age for Love: A Novel of Bangalore during World War II (2006) is by the same author. In the Shadow of Crows (2009) by David Charles Manners, is the critically acclaimed true account of a young Englishman's unexpected discovery of his Anglo-Indian relations in the Darjeeling district. The Hammarskjold Killing (2007) by William Higham, is a novel in which a London-born Anglo-Indian heroine is caught up in a terrorist crisis in Sri Lanka. Keith St Clair Butler wrote 'The Secret Vindaloo' (2014, reprint 2016) which used the signature dish of Vindaloo as a deep metaphor for the explorations of his family and community. The book received critical acclaim The narrative received grants from The Literature Board of Australia and The Victorian Premier's Department of the Arts.

== Christian religious practice ==
Anglo-Indians are adherents of Christianity. Along with their British heritage and English language, the Christian faith of Anglo-Indians is a major factor that distinguishes them from other ethnic groups. As such, Anglo-Indians have "been well-represented in all tiers of the churches, from cardinals, archbishops, bishops, priests and ministers, and fill a number of educational roles."

== Present communities ==
India constitutionally guarantees the rights of communities and religious and linguistic minorities, and thus permits Anglo-Indians to maintain their own schools and to use English as the medium of instruction. In order to encourage the integration of the community into the larger society, the government stipulates that a certain percentage of the student body come from other Indian communities.

In a 2013 BBC News feature on Anglo-Indians, journalist Kris Griffiths wrote: "It has been noted in recent years that the number of Anglo-Indians who have succeeded in certain fields is remarkably disproportionate to the community's size. For example, in the music industry there are Engelbert Humperdinck (born Madras), Peter Sarstedt (Delhi) and Cliff Richard (Lucknow). The looser definition of Anglo-Indian (any mixed British-Indian parentage) encompasses the likes of cricketer Nasser Hussain, footballer Michael Chopra and actor Ben Kingsley."

Air Vice-Marshal Maurice Barker was India's first Anglo-Indian Air Marshal. At least seven other Anglo-Indians subsequently reached that post, a notable achievement for a small community. A number of others have been decorated for military achievements. Air Marshal Malcolm Wollen is often considered the man who won India's 1971 war fighting alongside Bangladesh. Anglo-Indians made similarly significant contributions to the Indian Navy and Army.

One of the most respected matriculation qualifications in India, the Indian Certificate of Secondary Education, was brought up by some of the community's best known educationalists, including Frank Anthony, who served as its president, and A.E.T. Barrow, its secretary for half a century. Most Anglo-Indians, even those without much education, found that gaining employment in schools is easy because of their fluency in English.

Norman Pritchard became India's first ever Olympic medallist, winning two silver medals at the 1900 Olympic Games in Paris, France. In cricket Roger Binny was the leading wicket-taker during the Indian cricket team's 1983 World Cup triumph. Wilson Jones was India's first ever World Professional Billiards Champion.

Today, there are estimated to be 350,000-400,000 Anglo-Indians living in India, most of whom are based in the cities of Kolkata, Chennai, Bangalore, Mumbai, Delhi, Hyderabad, Ratlam, Kochi, Pune, Kollam, Secunderabad, Mysuru, Mangaluru, Kolar Gold Fields, Kanpur, Lucknow, Agra, Varanasi, Madurai, Coimbatore, Pothanur, Tiruchirapalli, The Nilgiris, and a few in Hospet and Hatti Gold Mines. Anglo-Indians also live in Goa and in Pondicherry. Significant populations also reside in the towns of Alappuzha, Kozhikode, and Cannanore (Kannur) in Kerala; Jamalpur in Bihar; Dehradun in Uttarkhand; Ranchi, McCluskieganj, and Dhanbad in Jharkand; Asansol, Kharagpur, and Kalimpong in West Bengal; and Khurda and Cuttack in Odisha. However, the Anglo-Indian population has dwindled over the years with most people migrating abroad or to other parts of the country. Tangasseri in Kollam city is the only place in Kerala State where Anglo-Indian tradition is maintained. However, almost all the colonial structures there have disappeared, except the Tangasseri Lighthouse built by the British in 1902.

Most of the Anglo-Indians overseas are concentrated in Britain, Australia, Canada, United States, and New Zealand, while some have settled in European countries like Switzerland, Germany, and France. According to the Anglo-Indians who have settled in Australia, integration for the most part has not been difficult. The community in Burma frequently intermarried with the local Anglo-Burmese community but both communities suffered from adverse discrimination since Burma's military took over the government in 1962, with most having now left the country to settle overseas.

== Political status ==
Article 366(2) of the Indian Constitution defines Anglo-Indian as:

(2) an Anglo Indian means a person whose father or any of whose other male progenitors in the male line is or was of European descent but who is domiciled within the territory of India and is or was born within such territory of parents habitually resident therein and not established there for temporary purposes only;

Between 1952 and 2020, the Anglo-Indian community was the only community in India that had its own representatives nominated to the Lok Sabha (lower house) in Parliament of India. These two members were nominated by the President of India on the advice of the Government of India. This right was secured from Jawaharlal Nehru by Frank Anthony, the first and longtime president of the All India Anglo-Indian Association. The community was represented by two members. This was done because the community had no native state of its own.

Fourteen states out of twenty-eight states in India; Andhra Pradesh, Bihar, Chhattisgarh, Gujarat, Jharkhand, Karnataka, Kerala, Madhya Pradesh, Maharashtra, Tamil Nadu, Telangana, Uttar Pradesh, Uttarakhand and West Bengal also had a nominated Anglo-Indian member each in their respective State Legislative Assemblies.

In January 2020, the Anglo-Indian reserved seats in the Parliament and State Legislatures of India were basically abolished by the 104th Constitutional Amendment Act, 2019.

== Other populations ==
Historically, the term Anglo-Indian was also used in common parlance in the British Government and England during the colonial era to refer to those people (such as Rudyard Kipling, or the hunter-naturalist Jim Corbett), who were of British descent but were born and raised in India, usually because their parents were serving in armed forces or one of the British-run administrations, such as its main government; "Anglo-Indian", in this sense, was a geographically-specific subset of overseas or non-domiciled British. The label Anglo-Indian, especially in modern usage, usually only refers to individuals with mixed Indian and British ancestry. However, Indian nationals with full British ancestry such as J. B. S. Haldane and S. H. Prater are sometimes referred to as Anglo-Indian as well, continuing the previous usage. There are many mixed Indians from other European countries during the colonial era. For example, the definition rarely embraces the descendants of the Indians from the old Portuguese colonies of both the Coromandel and Malabar Coasts, who joined the East India Company as mercenaries and brought their families with them. The definition has many extensions, for example, Luso-Indian (mixed Portuguese and Indian) of Goa and Kochi, people of Indo-French descent, and Indo-Dutch descent.

Indians have encountered Europeans since their earliest civilization. They have been a continuous element in the sub-continent. Their presence is not to be considered Anglo-Indian. Similarly, Indians who mixed with Europeans after the British Raj are also not to be considered Anglo-Indian.

== Population in other countries ==
=== Bangladesh ===
There is a significant population of Anglo-Indians in Bangladesh. Anglo-Indians have been present in Bangladesh since the colonial period. Their population decreased to 4,000 in 1947 during the Partition of India. Most of them migrated to the United Kingdom, United States, Australia, New Zealand and Canada. In 1970, however, almost 9,000 Anglo-Indians had come from India. During the 1971 Bangladesh Liberation War, almost 1,500 Anglo-Indians died. After the independence of Bangladesh, during 1974–1976 almost 2,800 Anglo-Indians arrived in Bangladesh from India. In 1980, there were 3,750 reported births of Anglo-Indian children in Bangladesh. By 1993, there were 10,371 Anglo-Indians living in Bangladesh. The Anglo-Indian population in the country reached 20,000 in 2016.

== See also ==
=== Similar communities ===
- Anglo-Burmese
- Luk khrueng
- Hāfu
- From the Dutch Empire
  - Burgher people, similar group in Sri Lanka
  - Indo people, similar group in the Dutch East Indies
  - Coloureds, similar group in present day South Africa
- From the Spanish Empire
  - Spanish Filipino, similar group in Spanish East Indies
  - Mestizo in Latin America
- From the Portuguese Empire:
  - Luso-Asians
  - Luso-Indians
  - Macanese people
  - Kristang people in Malacca, Malaysia
  - Bayingyi people in Myanmar (Burma)
- From the French Empire:
  - Métis in Canada
  - Louisiana Creole people

=== Ethnic groups in Britain ===
- British Asian
- British Indian
- British Pakistanis
- British Bangladeshis
- British Mixed-Race

=== Related topics ===
- Families In British India Society (FIBIS)
- Christianity in India
- Indian diaspora

=== Other ===
- India–United Kingdom relations
- Romani people in the United Kingdom

=== Further reading ===
- Sanyal, Tushar Kanti. (2007). Anglo-Indians of Kolkata : a study of their social alienation. Kolkata: Prova Prakashani. ISBN 8186964924
- Sen, Sudarshana. (2017). Anglo-Indian women in transition: pride, prejudice and predicament. Singapore: Palgrave Macmillan. ISBN 9811046549
- Andrews, Robyn & Raj, Merin Simi. (2021). Anglo-Indian identity: past and present, in India and the diaspora. Switzerland: Palgrave Macmillan. ISBN 3030644588

== Bibliography ==
- Anthony, Frank (1969). Britain's Betrayal in India: The Story Of The Anglo-Indian Community Simon Wallenberg Press, Amazon Books.
- Chapman, Pat (1998). Taste of the Raj, Hodder & Stoughton, London – ISBN 0-340-68035-0 (1997)
- Dady, Dorothy S. (2007). Scattered Seeds: The Diaspora of the Anglo-Indians Pagoda Press
- Deefholts, Margaret (2003). Haunting India: Fiction, Poems, Travel Tales and Memoirs CTR books
- Deefholts, Margaret and Staub, Sylvia W., eds. (2004). Voices on the Verandah: An anthology of Anglo-Indian Poetry and Prose CTR books
- Deefholts, Margaret and Deefholts, Glen, eds. The Way We Were: Anglo-Indian Chronicles CTR books
- Deefholts, Margaret and Deefholts, Susan Women of Anglo-India: Tales and Memoirs CTR books
- Dyer, Sylvia (2011). The Spell of the Flying Foxes ISBN 0143065343, Amazon Kindle Edition
- Gabb, Alfred (2000). 1600–1947 Anglo-Indian Legacy Beryl Pogson Books
- Hawes, Christopher J. (2013). Poor Relations: The Making of a Eurasian Community in British India, 1773–1833. London: Routledge.
- Lumb, Lionel and Veldhuizen, Deb, eds. The Way We Are: An Anglo-Indian Mosaic CTR books
- Lumb, Lionel, ed. More Voices on the Verandah: An Anglo-Indian Anthology CTR books
- Lyons, Mary Esther (2005). Unwanted! Memoirs of an Anglo-Indian Daughter... Spectrum Publications
- Maher, Reginald (1962). These Are The Anglo-Indians – (An Anglo-Indian Heritage Book) Simon Wallenberg Press
- Moore, Gloria Jean (1986). The Anglo-Indian Vision
- Phillips, Z The Anglo-Indian Australian Story: My Experience. A collection of Anglo-Indian Migration Heritage Stories
- Stark, Herbert Alick ([1926] 2022). Hostages To India: Or The Life Story of the Anglo Indian Race Simon Wallenberg Press.
- Thomas, Noel, ed. Footprints On The Track: Anglo-Indian Railway Memories
- Thorpe, Owen (2007). Paper Boats in the Monsoon: Life in the Lost World of Anglo-India Trafford Publishing
- White, Bridget The Best of Anglo-Indian Cuisine – A Legacy, Flavours of the Past, Anglo-Indian Delicacies, The Anglo-Indian Festive Hamper, A Collection of Anglo-Indian Roasts, Casseroles and Bakes
- Williams, Blair R. (2002). Anglo-Indians: Vanishing Remnants of a Bygone Era CTR books
